= List of School of the Art Institute of Chicago people =

This is a list of notable people affiliated with the School of the Art Institute of Chicago or the SAIC predecessor Chicago Academy of Fine Arts (1879-1882) The later Chicago Academy of Fine Arts, founded October 6, 1902 by the artist Carl Werntz, is unrelated to the Art Institute of Chicago.

== Notable alumni ==
=== Animation ===
- Alex Lee, 3D animator

=== Comics, cartoons ===
- Gene Ahern (1895–1960), comics, cartoonist
- Jeffrey Brown, cartoonist
- John Churchill Chase, cartoonist (Chicago Academy of Fine Arts)
- Fred Ellis, political cartoonist (Chicago Academy of Fine Arts) (did not graduate)
- Hal Foster, creator of the comic strip Prince Valiant
- Herblock, political cartoonist (Herb Block)
- Ed Holland, cartoonist
- Shaw McCutcheon, editorial cartoonist
- Bill Mauldin, political cartoonist (Chicago Academy of Fine Arts)
- Chris Ware, alternative cartoonist
- Gahan Wilson, cartoonist (Chicago Academy of Fine Arts)

=== Designers ===
- Charles C. Dawson, illustrator, book designer
- Verna Keays, flag designer and interior designer
- Robert E. Paige, designer
- Art Paul, graphic designer
- Norman Teague, designer
- Herbert Temple Jr., art director

=== Fashion ===
- Sky Cubacub, fashion designer
- Halston, fashion designer
- Maria Pinto (fashion designer)
- J. Morgan Puett, fashion designer, multimedia artist
- Cynthia Rowley, fashion designer
- Jasmin Shokrian, fashion designer

=== Filmmakers ===
- Vincente Minnelli, filmmaker
- Jun Nguyen-Hatsushiba, filmmaker
- Miguel A Reina, filmmaker
- Anne Rosellini, film producer
- Hong Sang-soo, film director
- Apichatpong Weerasethakul, filmmaker
- Orson Welles, filmmaker
- Son Suk-ku, actor and film director
- Chung Mong-hong, filmmaker

=== Jewelers and light metal artists ===
- Eileen Abdulrashid, artist, enameler

=== Illustrators ===
- Wilfrid Swancourt Bronson, illustrator
- Margaret Brundage, illustrator (Chicago Academy of Fine Arts)
- Bradshaw Crandell, illustrator and portraitist (attended classes)
- Edward Gorey, illustrator
- Frank Xavier Leyendecker, illustrator
- J. C. Leyendecker, illustrator for over 300 Saturday Evening Post covers.
- Dom Orejudos, erotic artist, ballet dancer, and choreographer
- Domino (artist), erotic artist Donald Merrick
- Edward A. Wilson

=== Painters ===
- Gertrude Abercrombie (1909–1977), surrealist painter
- Ivan Albright, painter
- Scribner Ames (1908-1993), painter and sculptor
- Frances Badger, muralist
- Don Balke, painter
- Gina Beavers (born 1974), bas-relief painting
- Enella Benedict, realism and landscape painter
- Thomas Hart Benton, painter
- Ryan Bock, painter
- Willard Bond (1926–2012), painter, watercolorist
- Jessie Arms Botke, painter
- Roger Brown (B.F.A. 1968, M.F.A. 1970), painter
- Edward William Carlson, painter
- Eleanor Coen, painter
- George Cohen, painter
- Frederick Carl Frieseke, painter
- Eve Garrison, painter
- Leon Golub, painter
- Barbara Grad, painter, co-founder of Artemisia Gallery
- Jennifer Guidi, painter
- Cornelia Ellis Hildebrandt, portrait miniaturist
- Rudolph F. Ingerle, landscape painter
- Michiko Itatani, painter
- Virginia Hendrickson Irvin, painter, miniaturist
- Grace Spaulding John, painter
- Max Kahn, painter
- Herb Kawainui Kane, painter, designer, Living Treasure of Hawaii
- Alice De Wolf Kellogg, painter
- David Klamen, painter
- Paul Lamantia, painter
- Judy Ledgerwood, painter
- Ella Fillmore Lillie (1884–1972), painter
- Dorothy Loeb (1877–1971), painter, print maker, muralist, art teacher
- Lubov, painter
- Charles A. MacLellan, painter and illustrator
- Raúl Martínez, Cuban painter and Pop artist
- Eugenie McEvoy, painter
- Joan Mitchell, painter
- Archibald J. Motley, painter
- Elizabeth Murray, painter
- LeRoy Neiman, painter
- Angela von Neumann, folk art painter
- Gladys Nilsson, painter
- Jim Nutt, painter
- Paul Haggard,(born 1965) painter
- Georgia O'Keeffe (did not graduate, attended 1905–1906), painter
- Ed Paschke, painter
- J. K. Ralston, painter of the Old West
- Grace Ravlin, (1873 – 1956), painter of festivals and street scenes in exotic locales
- Virginia Richmond Reynolds, portrait miniaturist
- Flora Schofield, (1871–1960) abstract painter and printmaker
- David Sharpe (B.F.A., 1966; M.F.A., 1968), painter
- Kay Smith (artist), watercolor artist and educator
- John Stephan, Abstract expressionist painter
- Minerva Teichert, muralist
- Mark Tobey, painter
- Charles White, painter
- Charles Banks Wilson, painter
- Grant Wood, painter, known for his work "American Gothic" (1930)
- Jimmy Wright (artist), painter
- Mary Agnes Yerkes, painter
- Thomas H. Kapsalis,(1925 – 2022) painter and sculptor
- Ruth Leonela Buentello, born 1984 (B.F.A., 2008) painter

=== Photographers ===
- Natalie Bookchin, photographer
- Joyce Neimanas, photographer
- Darryl DeAngelo Terrell (M.F.A. 2017), photographer, curator
- William Vandivert, photographer
- Victor Skrebneski, photographer

=== Mixed media artists, multidisciplinary artists ===
- Jennifer Angus (born 1961), installation artist, collage artist
- Elizabeth Axtman (born 1980), video artist, photographer
- Robin Barcus Slonina (B.F.A. 1993), multidisciplinary artist, installation artist
- Jane Benson, conceptual artist
- Sanford Biggers, filmmaker, sculptor, musician
- Caitlin Cherry, painter, sculptor
- Sonya Clark, textiles, performance, installation artist
- William Cordova, (B.F.A. 1996), multidisciplinary artist
- Charles C. Dawson, painter, printmaker, illustrator, and graphic designer
- Katharine Sturges Dodge, writer, illustrator, jewelry designer
- Jeffrey Gibson, painter, sculptor
- Ashley Hunt, photographer and filmmaker, performer and writer
- Rashid Johnson, photographer, sculptor, installation artist
- Jennie C. Jones, sound and visual artist
- Lawrence Arthur Jones, muralist, printmaker
- Alex Jovanovich, visual artist and Artforum senior editor
- Jin Soo Kim, installation artist
- Irving Kriesberg, painter, sculptor, animator
- Dan Kwong, performance artist, writer, teacher, playwright (Be Like Water)
- Erica Lord, performance artist, photographer
- Carole Frances Lung, performance artist, professor.
- Joe Mangrum, sand painter, painter, sculptor, installation artist
- Santiago Martinez Delgado, (Chicago Academy of Fine Arts) muralist, illustrator, and sculptor
- Margaret Noble, conceptual artist and sound artist
- Trevor Paglen, photographer, conceptual artist
- Eunice Parsons, modernist collage artist
- Cheryl Pope, sculpture, installation, and performance art
- Frank Piatek, painting, drawing, installation art
- Sabrina Raaf, contemporary mechanized sculpture artist, and photographer
- Lester Raymer, multidisciplinary artist
- Dread Scott, performer, photographer, printmaker
- Nancy Spero, painter, printmaker, collage artist
- Kunié Sugiura, (B.F.A. 1967), photographer, painter, and multimedia artist
- Donald Sultan, painter, sculptor, printmaker
- Rirkrit Tiravanija, installation artist
- Wu Tsang, performer, filmmaker
- Ginger Wallace, illustrator, sculptor
- Wang Xin (M.F.A. 2011), installation art, moving images, new media
- H.C. Westermann, painter, sculptor
- Richard Wetzel, paintings, collage, sculptures
- Ellis Wilson, painter
- Florence Wyle (1881–1968) American-Canadian sculptor, poet, and designer
- Choi Yan-chi, performance artist

=== New media artists, digital artists ===
- Pat Badani (born 1951), new media artist
- Annette Barbier, new media artist
- Jack Beal, painter
- Katherine Behar, new media artist
- Jeremy Blake (1971–2007), digital artist, painter
- Paul Chan, multimedia
- JoAnn Gillerman, (M.F.A.1975), new media artist
- Amanda Ross-Ho, (B.F.A. 1998), multimedia artist
- Sterling Ruby, multimedia artist
- Roger Welch, multimedia artist
- Barbara Blondeau, experimental photographer
- Marisa González, multimedia artist, years 1971-73

=== Sculptors ===
- Enrique Alférez (1901–1999), sculptor
- Carleton W. Angell (1887–1962), sculptor
- Richmond Barthé, sculptor
- John Chamberlain, sculptor
- Leelee Chan, (B.F.A., 2006), winner of 9th BMW Art Journeys prize
- Amanda Crowe, (M.F.A, 1952), sculptor, wood-carver, and educator.
- Ulric Ellerhusen, sculptor
- Alice Jacobsen (1928–1993), American sculptor
- Victoria Fuller, artist and sculptor
- Ruth Horsting, sculptor, professor emerita of art at University of California, Davis (1959 to 1971), worked alongside Baba Hari Dass.
- Richard Hunt, sculptor
- Jeff Koons, sculptor
- Claes Oldenburg (attended from 1950–1954), sculptor
- Adrienne Outlaw, sculptor
- Dean Snyder, (M.F.A., 1978), American sculptor
- Paula Mary Turnbull (1921–2018), sculptor

=== Other ===
- Harry Aleman, Chicago mobster
- Tatsu Aoki, musician
- BenDeLaCreme, drag queen, stage performer
- Tania Bruguera, artist, activist
- Beatriz Albuquerque, artist, performer, activist
- John Dunn, software developer
- Patty Yumi Cottrell, writer
- Kent Devereaux, (M.F.A. 1985), President, New Hampshire Institute of Art
- Mat Devine, musician
- Nora Dunn, actress
- Emil Ferris, (B.F.A, M.F.A) Author of bestseller "My Favorite Thing is Monsters", Artist
- Suzanne Fiol, avant-garde music producer and founder of ISSUE Project Room
- Hilda Goldblatt Gorenstein (Hilgos), marine artist
- Art Green, painter, original member of The Hairy Who
- Ed Harris, actor (Received an honorary diploma in 2003.)
- Stieg Hedlund (attended 1984-1985) video game designer
- Hugh Hefner (took anatomy classes), founder of Playboy
- Don Herold, humorist (did not graduate)
- Robert Indiana, designer, "Love (sculpture)"
- Amelia Ishmael, curator, art critic
- Ryan Ken, actor, writer, and comedian
- Tim Kinsella, (MFA in Writing) Founding member of both influential underground punk band Cap'n Jazz and experimental rock band Joan of Arc (band)
- Matteo Lane, (B.F.A. 2009), Comedian, oil painter, and singer
- Jon Lindsay (M.F.A. in Writing, 2005) solo recording artist, producer, political activist
- Liv.e, musician (did not graduate)
- Robert Lostutter, painter, original member of the Chicago Imagists
- Gene Markey, Hollywood producer and screenwriter
- Mark Nelson, artist, professor
- Audrey Niffenegger, author (The Time Traveler's Wife)
- Kim Novak, actress
- Rebecca Odes, media entrepreneur, musician, and author
- MK Pritzker, First Lady of Illinois
- Yasmil Raymond, visual art curator
- Rebecca Ringquist (M.F.A 2003), fiber artist, author
- David Sedaris (B.F.A. 1987), author, humorist
- George Sellon, architect
- Victor Skrebneski, fashion photographer
- Peter Sotos, writer, musician, and child pornography publisher, longtime member of Whitehouse
- Robert Storr, curator, critic, painter, writer
- Margaret Taylor-Burroughs (B.F.A. 1946, M.A.E. 1948), museum founder, artist, educator
- Barbara Tetenbaum, artist books
- Madeline Tourtelot, filmmaker, painter, art school founder
- Sarah Vowell (M.A. 1996), author, humourist
- Casper D. Waller, Wisconsin State Assemblyman
- Chris Ward IV, better known as MC Chris, a hip-hop rapper
- Anita Willets-Burnham, artist and author
- Karl Wirsum, painter, original member of The Hairy Who
- Wen Yiduo, Chinese poet, scholar

== Notable faculty ==
- Franco (Frank) Barsotti, Department of Photography
- Benjamin Bellas
- George Bellows (Chicago Academy of Fine Arts)
- Wafaa Bilal
- Rika Burnham, Teaching Institute in Museum Education
- James Blomfield (Chicago Academy of Fine Arts)
- Stan Brakhage
- Christopher Bratton
- Patty Carroll, photographer, taught from 1999 to 2014
- Nick Cave
- Francis Chapin
- Louis Grell
- Susanna Coffey
- John Rogers Cox
- Barbara Degenevieve
- James Elkins
- LaToya Ruby Frazier
- Michelle Grabner
- Diana Guerrero-Maciá
- Claudia Hart
- Tiffany Holmes
- Tony Jones, president from 1986 to 1992 and 1996 to 2008, namesake of Jones Hall
- Eduardo Kac
- Max Kahn
- Adam Levin
- Adelheid Mers
- Ayanah Moor
- Phil Morton
- Joyce Neimanas
- Kamau Amu Patton, multidisciplinary artist
- Claire Pentecost
- Tony Phillips
- Frank Piatek
- Jefferson Pinder
- Jaume Plensa
- Albin Polasek, sculptor
- Barbara Rossi, painter, original member of the Chicago Imagists
- Jerry Saltz
- David Sedaris
- Sonia Sheridan, artist, founder of Generative Systems: Art Science and Technology Department
- Lorado Taft, sculptor
- Mika Tosca
- Ruth VanSickle Ford (Chicago Academy of Fine Arts)
- James F. Walker
- Mechtild Widrich
- Amanda Williams
- Anne Wilson
- Karl Wirsum
- Ray Yoshida
