= Fire Island Art Residency =

New York art organization

- Abbreviation: FIAR
- Formation: 2011
- Type: Non-profit 501(c)(3) organization
- Purpose: Artists residency for lesbian, gay, bisexual, transgender, non-binary, intersex and queer identifying emerging visual artists on Fire Island, NY
- Website: http://www.fireislandartistresidency.org/

Fire Island Art Residency (FIAR) is a New York-based organization founded in 2011 as the first residency to provide resources to emerging LGBTQ-identifying artists and poets. FIAR provides free live/work space to visual artists who create, socialize, and immerse themselves in the Fire Island community for four weeks during the summer. They are visited by renowned artists and scholars who interact with residents through studio visits, dinners, and discussions, providing support and feedback.

== Description ==
Founded in 2011, the Residency is located in the small town of Cherry Grove on Fire Island.

In 2015, the residencies house burned down as well as several other buildings, including the historic Ice Palace nightclub.

The residency often has lectures and artist presentations at the Cherry Grove Community House, a landmarked building that in 1948 became the first theater continually producing work for gay, lesbian, transgender, and queer audiences, according to art historian and curator Alex Fialho.

In 2020, poet and writer April Freely, previously the program coordinator at the non-profit arts organization Vermont Studio Center, succeeded cofounder Chris Bogia as the Residency's executive director.

== Notable participants ==
- Marcel Alcalá
- Elliott Jerome Brown Jr.
- A.K. Burns
- Edie Fake
- Brendan Fernandes
- madison moore
- Paul Mpagi Sepuya
- Devan Shimoyama
- Ginger Brooks Takahashi
- Darryl DeAngelo Terrell
- D'Angelo Lovell Williams
