= Frank Barsotti =

American photographer (1937–2012)

Franco A. "Frank" Barsotti (November 20, 1937, - June 6, 2012) was an American photographer. Youngest of three children, he was born and raised in Chicago's historic Pullman area by Italian immigrant parents. Italy, where he returned often, was a common theme through much of his work, such as the series Italy 1974 and White.

His noted series Artigiano consists of photographs of tools hand-made by his father.

Though trained in traditional black-and-white photography, Franco embraced digital technology and was one of the earliest professors to work with digital photography.

Franco received a Bachelor of Science Degree in Photography from the Institute of Design at Illinois Institute of Technology, where he studied under Harry Callahan and Aaron Siskind. He attended the graduate program in photography at Ohio University in Athens, Ohio, and received a Master of Fine Arts in Photography from the School of the Art Institute of Chicago, where he also taught for 38 years.

The following is an excerpt from a statement from the School of the Art Institute of Chicago upon Frank Barsotti's death on June 6, 2012:

While teaching at the SAIC, Frank completed his MFA (1969), and a suite of his black-and-white photographs from this period are in the permanent collection of the Art Institute of Chicago. Along with Professor Fred Endsley, Frank was one of the first faculty members to experiment with digital technology. He was an intrepid maker, and early on, championed alternative and non-silver processes, and what was then considered radical digital processes. Frank was a passionate and dedicated teacher, unafraid to deliver forceful opinions on art and education. He believed strongly in the art school process of dialogue, experimentation, and critique, and this legacy endures in his department and beyond.

Though living in Washington State for the [last] 10 years [of his life], Frank was born and raised in Chicago's historic Pullman area and spent the majority of his life in and dedicated to Chicago. He taught alongside Joyce Niemanas, Barbara Crane, and Ken Josephson, and during his years at SAIC taught nearly 2,000 students.
