= Julie Chen (book artist) =

American book artist (born 1963)

- Born: 1963 (age 62–63); Inglewood, California
- Known for: Book arts

Julie Chen (born 1963) is an internationally known book artist who has been publishing limited edition artists' books under the Flying Fish Press imprint since 1987, which she also established at that time. Her books combine text and image with innovative book structures to create reading experiences that engage the reader in interactions that go beyond the simple turning of a page. Her work can be found in numerous collections worldwide including the Library of Congress, Washington, D.C., the Victoria and Albert Museum, London, and the Sir George Grey Special Collections, Auckland, NZ. In 2009 she was a featured artist in the PBS television series Craft in America.

== Education and teaching ==
Chen was born in 1963 in Inglewood, California. She completed an undergraduate degree in printmaking at the University of California, Berkeley in 1984. She subsequently became interested in book arts and got a degree in book arts from Mills College in 1989. She began teaching book arts at Mills College as an adjunct in 1996 and became an associate professor in 2010.

In 2022, after Mills College merged with Northeastern University and ended its book arts program, Chen joined the University of Wisconsin-Madison as a professor in the School of Education's Art Department.

During her summers, she teaches book arts workshops around the United States, including at Penland School of Craft.

== Career ==
Chen has achieved prominence by creating conceptually sophisticated works that combine traditional techniques, such as letterpress printing and hand bookbinding, with more modern technologies such as photopolymer plates and laser cutting. She is known for pushing the structural boundaries of the artist's book with a range of architectural and sculptural approaches. At the same time, her work is praised for its high standard of production and emphasis on the artist's book as a tactile experience. Victoria Steele, the former Brooke Russell Astor Director of Collection Strategy for New York Public Library, remarked that the "physical form" of Chen's work "reinforces the concept and text." Chen investigates the "complex experience" of book arts through her work as an artist and educator.

During her time as a student at Mills College, Chen founded Flying Fish Press, publishing limited-edition artists' books. Chen typically works independently but has also produced books collaboratively with fiber artist Nance O'Banion and book artists Barbara Tetenbaum and Clifton Meador.

Chen's 1992 book, Octopus, features a tunnel-like, pop-up element known in the book trade as a "peep show" and includes text written by poet Elizabeth McDevitt. It offers a three-dimensional underwater scene with the tentacles of an octopus extending behind the words, creating a physical analogue of the poem, which speaks of concealment, disguise, and distance.

In 1994, Chen collaborated with fellow book artist, Ed Hutchins, on River of Stars, a small book, only three by three inches that was released in an edition of 100.

Bon Bon Mots (1998), a meditation on the fleeting sweetness of life, takes the form of a box of chocolates, each of which, on being unwrapped, reveals itself as a tiny book. Each of the five 'chocolate box' books is folded differently and illustrate the range of approaches Chen brings to each project. "Social Graces" is a lotus-fold type, "Life Cycle" is a tetra-tetra flexagon, "Elegy" is a concertina with leaf-shaped pages in a clay cover, "Labyrinth" is ball-in-a-maze type of puzzle in a paper slipcase, and "Either/Or" is a "magic wallet". Chen has also worked with the volvelle or wheel chart, which is a set of stacked paper disks of varying sizes, sometimes with windows.

Chen's books reflect her current interests, current events, and her own personal experiences. In 2002, she released The Veil, a work created in the time leading up to the Iraq War; Chen explains that the book "presents personal reflections inspired by the current political situation in the Middle East and the world" and is in a carousel format.

Chen’s books are in the collections the Museum of Modern Art in New York City, the National Museum of Women in the Arts in Washington D.C., and the Victoria and Albert Museum in London.

== Flying Fish Press ==
Julie Chen began Flying Fish Press in 1987 as a graduate student in Book Art at Mills College in Oakland, California. Though mostly a personal press for books by Julie Chen, she has also collaborated on artist’s book projects with other artists including Lois Morrison, Barbara Tetenbaum and Clifton Meador.

== Group exhibitions ==
Exhibits listed in Benezit Dictionary of Artists unless otherwise noted

- 1989, Forwarding the Book: California Bookmakers, Victoria and Albert Museum, London
- 1991, California Artists’ Books, Armory Center for the Arts, Pasadena
- 1992, Word and Image, Pacific Center for the Book Arts, San Francisco
- 1995, The Art of Discovery: Scientists’ Books/Artists’ Books, Smithsonian Institution, Washington, DC
- 2003, Ninety from the Nineties: A Decade of Printing, New York Public Library, New York
- 2005, The Artist Turns to the Book, Getty Center, Los Angeles
- 2006, The Book as Art: Twenty Years of Artists’ Books from the National Museum of Women in the Arts, National Museum of Women in the Arts, Washington, DC
- 2008, Skipping the Page, Center for Book Arts, New York
- 2010, Beyond the Text: Artists’ Books from the Collection of Robert J. Rubin, Grolier Club, New York
- 2010, Fourth International Biennale for the Artists’ Book, Bibliotheca Alexandrina, Alexandria
- 2011, One by One: An Exploration of Book Art, Craft in America Study Center, Los Angeles
- 2012, Exploding the Codex: The Theater of the Book, San Francisco Center for the Book, San Francisco
- 2012, Quand Les Livres S’amusent, Musée de l’Imprimerie, Lyon

== Solo exhibitions ==
Exhibits listed in Benezit Dictionary of Artists unless otherwise noted

- 2002, The Art of Flying Fish Press, University of Vermont, Burlington
- 2003, The Art of Flying Fish Press, PABA Gallery, New Haven
- 2005, Bookworks of Flying Fish Press, Mills College Library, Oakland
- 2006, Bookworks from Flying Fish Press, Woodland Pattern Book Center, Milwaukee
- 2008, The Bookworks of Flying Fish Press, Center for Book Arts, New York
- 2020, Julie Chen: True to Life, Library & Research Center at the National Museum of Women in the Arts

== Artists books ==
Flying Fish Press Books in chronological order

- 2019 Wayfinding, text and image by Julie Chen. 50 copies
- 2018 Half- Century, text and image by Julie Chen. 50 copies
- 2017 A Recuerdo for Ste. Ostrich, text and image by Lois Morrison; book design and paper engineering by Julie Chen. 50 copies
- 2016 Bitter Chocolate, text by Julie Chen. Images by Julie Chen and Keri Miki-Lani Schroeder. 50 copies
- 2015 Composite Impressions, text and image by Julie Chen. 50 copies
- 2014 Chrysalis, text and image by Julie Chen. 50 copies
- 2013 Family Tree, text and image by Julie Chen. 50 copies
- 2013 Praxis (Illustrated), text and image by Julie Chen. 50 copies
- 2013 Cat’s Cradle, text and image by Julie Chen. 50 copies
- 2012 Memento, text and image by Julie Chen. 50 copies
- 2011 Glimpse, text and image by Julie Chen and Barbara Tetenbaum. 100 copies
- 2011 How Books Work, text and image by Julie Chen and Clifton Meador. Open edition
- 2010 Invented Landscape, text and image by Julie Chen. 50 copies
- 2009 A Guide to Higher Learning, text and image by Julie Chen. 100 copies
- 2008 Panorama, text and image by Julie Chen. 100 copies
- 2006 View, text and image by Julie Chen. 100 copies
- 2006 Full Circle, text and image by Julie Chen. 100 copies
- 2004 True to Life, text and image by Julie Chen. 100 copies
- 2003 Personal Paradigms: A Game of Human Experience, text and image by Julie Chen. 100 copies
- 2002 The Veil, text and image by Julie Chen. 100 copies
- 2001 Ode to a Grand Staircase, text by Erik Satie, Book design and images by Julie Chen and Barbara Tetenbaum. 100 Copies
- 2001 Evidence of Compression, text and image by Julie Chen
- 2000 (In)versions, images by Julie Chen and David Turner. 30 copies.
- 1999 World Without End, text and image by Julie Chen. 25 copies.
- 1998 Bon Bon Mots, text and image by Julie Chen. 100 copies.
- 1997 Leavings, text and image by Julie Chen. 100 copies.
- 1996 Life Time, text and image by Julie Chen. 100 copies.
- 1996 Space-Time Geometry, text and book design by Julie Chen. Drawings by David Turner. 10 copies.
- 1995 Radio Silence, text and image by Julie Chen. 75 copies.
- 1994 Double Helix: An Essential Component of all living Matter, text and image by Julie Chen. One-of-a-kind book
- 1994 River of Stars, text and image by Julie Chen. 100 copies.
- 1993 Correspondence Course, text and image by Nance O’Banion. Book Design by Julie Chen 125 copies.
- 1992 Octopus, text by Elizabeth McDevitt, images by Julie Chen. 100 copies.
- 1992 You Are Here, text and image by Julie Chen. 100 copies
- 1992 Listening, text, and image by Julie Chen. 75 copies
- 1990 Domestic Science: Pop-up Icons & Idioms, text and image by Nance O'Banion. Book design by Julie Chen. 150 Copies.
- 1990 Ste. Ostrich in Manhattan: The visitation of a Martyr, text and image by Lois Morrison. Book Design by Julie Chen 125 copies.
- 1989 Requiem, text by Julie Chen and text from the Requiem of Hector Berlioz. 12 copies.
- 1988 Memories of Fruit, text and image by Lois Morrison. Book Design by Julie Chen. 50 copies.
- 1988 Symphonic Visions, images by Julie Chen. One of a kind.
- 1987 Origin, text and image by Julie Chen. 6 copies.
- 1987 A Place of Uncertain Refuge, text by E.B. Mudd, frontispiece and book design by Julie Chen 75 copies.
- 1987 The First Seven Days, text from Genesis, images and book design by Julie Chen.
