= Mark Nelson =

Mark Nelson or Marc Nelson may refer to:

- Mark Nelson (actor) (born 1955), American theater actor, director, and acting teacher
- Mark Nelson (cricketer) (born 1986), English cricketer
- Mark Nelson (police officer), superintendent of the North Dakota Highway Patrol
- Mark Nelson (artist, born 1953), artist whose work has appeared in role-playing games and comic books
- Mark Nelson (artist, born 1957), artist who has contributed public art to the Chicago area
- Mark Nelson (boxing referee), boxing referee from Maplewood, Minnesota
- Mark Nelson (musician), musician with the band Pan American
- Mark Nelson (Canadian football) (born 1956), defensive coordinator for the Edmonton Eskimos
- Mark Nelson (offensive lineman) (born 1964)
- Mark Nelson (footballer) (born 1969), Scottish former footballer
- Mark Nelson (video game designer), video game designer
- Mark Nelson (scientist), American ecologist
- Mark L. Nelson, American chemist
- Mark T. Nelson, American physiologist
- Marc Nelson (singer) (born 1971), American singer-songwriter and former member of R&B group Boyz II Men
- Marc Nelson (entertainer), Australian host in the Philippines
