= Tony Phillips (American artist) =

American visual artist

- Born: Anthony Stuart Wiley Phillips; 1937 (age 88–89); Miami Beach, Florida, US
- Education: Yale School of Art, Trinity College
- Known for: Painting, drawing, film
- Spouse: Judith Raphael
- Awards: National Endowment for the Arts, Art Institute of Chicago, Illinois Arts Council
- Website: Tony Phillips

Tony Phillips, Humble Supplicant, oil on canvas, 25" x 21", 1987.

Tony Phillips (born 1937) is an American artist and educator based in Chicago whose work has included painting, drawing and film. He is associated with figurative and surrealist currents of Chicago art in the later 20th century, without precisely being identified with such groups as the Imagists or The Hairy Who; critics have suggested that the lack of such affiliations has caused him and similar artists in the city to be comparatively overlooked. His art employs painterly, softly modeled representation that belies sometimes dark psychological explorations and fantastical or archetypal scenarios. Art in America critic Robert Berlind wrote, "Phillips's best pictures, with their particular tension between humor and eeriness, between the familiar and the eccentric, between the fanciful and the obsessive, are like a high-wire act, carried off in dream time."

Phillips's work belongs to the public art collections of the Art Institute of Chicago, Museum of Contemporary Art, Chicago, and Mary and Leigh Block Museum of Art, among others. He has received awards from the National Endowment for the Arts, Illinois Arts Council and Art Institute of Chicago. He is a professor emeritus of painting and drawing at the School of the Art Institute of Chicago.

== Life and career ==
Anthony Stuart Wiley Phillips was born in Miami Beach, Florida in 1937 and raised in Rochester, New York. He attended Trinity College in Connecticut, graduating with a BA in 1960, before enrolling at the Yale School of Art & Architecture, where he earned a BFA (1962) and MFA (1963). While at Yale, he studied painting with Alex Katz, Philip Pearlstein, Esteban Vicente and Neil Welliver, and received a grant to travel to the École Americaine des Beaux-Arts in France in 1961, where he studied sculpture with Etienne-Henri Martin.

Following his graduation, Phillips lived in New York City and taught at the School of Visual Arts. After receiving a one-year post-graduate fellowship at the University of Pennsylvania, he moved to Chicago to take a position at the School of the Art Institute of Chicago in 1969. In 1980, he married artist and educator Judith Raphael. Since 1983, they have lived and worked at their converted warehouse in Chicago's Pilsen neighborhood.

In the early part of his career, Phillips exhibited at venues including the Institute of Contemporary Art, Philadelphia, Art Institute of Chicago ("Chicago and Vicinity" shows, 1973 and 1985; "American Art Since World War II: Prints and Drawings," 1989–90), Indianapolis Museum of Art, Museum of Contemporary Art (MCA) Chicago, and Marianne Deson Gallery. Later, he exhibited at the Chicago Cultural Center, Hyde Park Art Center, Lyons Weir Gallery, National Academy Museum, Block Museum of Art, Islip Art Museum, Illinois State Museum, MCA Chicago ("Surrealism: the Conjured Life," 2015–6), and Evanston Art Center, among others.

== Artwork and reception ==
Tony Phillips, Marquess of Hearts, pastel, 41.5" x 29.5", 1988.

Phillips has generally worked intuitively, developing images through impulsive, spontaneous drawing derived from imagination, memory, psychoanalytic investigation and casual observation, which he gradually explores with more conscious consideration. His art often exposes invisible inclinations and desires, anxieties and misapprehensions that potentially amuse, edify or provoke questions. His frequent subjects include people, chimeric creatures, landscapes and weather events, presented in precise but enigmatic scenarios: women morphing into sphinxes or trees, lightning strikes, rushing trains or planes, and a ubiquitous surrogate character, depicted naked, soft, vulnerable and mortal.

Critic James Yood described Phillips's paintings as "crucibles of fantasy, strange and wondrous scenarios that simultaneously assault and delight" through imaginative orchestrations of space, form and logic and strange, discordant rhythms with a dreamlike, sometimes foreboding ambiguity. He noted a recurring motif of mythic, Promethean fire and light, which provides "an odd kind of illumination and an almost primal sense of danger." Chicago Tribune writer Alan Artner also wrote about of this effect, that "everything strange in the pictures appears to have come together instantaneously, as if illuminated for a fraction of a second by a bolt of lightning [or] coalesced in a private flash or epiphany that the artist has made public."

== Films ==
In the 1970s, Phillips created four short films that experimented with time-lapse and high-speed cameras and were shown as part of the PBS program "Landscape in Motion" and at film festivals, the Art Institute of Chicago and MCA Chicago: Inertia (1974), Last Supper/Second Coming (1976) and Head for Shelter (1978). Inertia—a prizewinner at the Toronto Super-8 and Ann Arbor film festivals—presented time-lapse footage of Phillips sitting motionless in a chair in the desert from dawn until sunset, impervious to heat, dust and wind; New York Times critic Benjamin Genocchio described it as "simultaneously an endurance performance piece and a study in changing light and atmospheric effects" that recalled the films of Andy Warhol.

== Teaching and writing ==
Phillips taught at School of the Art Institute of Chicago for over fifty years, serving as a professor between 1985 and 2001 and as chair of the film and painting and drawing departments at various points. His former students include artists Michiko Itatani, Judy Ledgerwood, Rebecca Morris, Frank Piatek, Donald Sultan and Mary Lou Zelazny and critic-curator Robert Storr, among others. He was also an instructor at the School of Visual Arts in New York and the Palo Alto Art Center in California.

Phillips has written catalogue essays and articles on Joseph Beuys, Leon Golub, drawing and other subjects for publications including the New Art Examiner, Whitewalls and Mission at Tenth.

== Recognition ==
Phillips has received fellowships and grants from the National Endowment for the Arts (1978, 1985), Illinois Arts Council (1984, 1988, 1990) and the Art Institute of Chicago (Jacob and Bessie Levy Prize, 1985). He has been awarded artist residencies from the Djerassi Foundation, Macdowell Colony, Virginia Center for the Creative Arts and Yaddo, among others. His work belongs to the public collections of institutions including the Art Institute of Chicago, Block Museum of Art, Chicago Film Archives, DePaul Art Museum, Elmhurst College, the Illinois State Museum, and the Museum of Contemporary Art Chicago.
