= Judith Raphael =

American visual artist

- Born: 1938 (age 87–88); Chicago, Illinois, United States
- Known for: Painting, watercolors, gouache
- Spouse: Tony Phillips
- Awards: National Academy Museum, National Endowment for the Arts, Illinois Arts Council
- Website: Judith Raphael

Judith Raphael, In Motion, oil on canvas, 18" x 42", 1996.

Judith Raphael (born 1938) is an American figurative painter and educator based in Chicago. She is known for provocative depictions of childhood, particularly contemporary girlhood and its passage toward adulthood. This work emerged in the wake of feminism, and in style and content, was influenced by figurative painters such as Paula Rego, Balthus and Lucian Freud. Her paintings often recast heroic art-historical portrayals of men (e.g., appropriated postures from classical sculptures of David and Greek warriors) with contemporary girls in order to redress the paucity of strong female icons in Western art. Writer Carol Becker said of Raphael's later portraits, "[her] girls are different races and sizes, and each one's face and posture is unique, but they share attitude. Although they are hip, they seem not yet secure in who they are or what they are about; they appear to be trying to construct their identities."

Raphael's work has been exhibited at the Museum of Contemporary Art Chicago, Art Institute of Chicago and DeCordova Museum, recognized with awards from the National Endowment for the Arts and National Academy Museum, and collected by the Mary and Leigh Block Museum of Art and School of the Art Institute of Chicago.

== Life and career ==
Raphael was born in Chicago, Illinois in 1938. She earned a BFA from the University of Mississippi in 1960 and a MA from Northwestern University in 1962. She taught art at Moraine Valley Community College from 1969 to 2000 and also at the School of the Art Institute of Chicago (SAIC). In 1980, she married artist and SAIC professor Tony Phillips. Since 1985, they have lived and worked out of their converted warehouse in the Pilsen neighborhood of Chicago. She has a daughter, Leslie Gordon; her son, the late Alex Gordon, was also an artist.

In her early career, Raphael exhibited at venues including the Art Institute of Chicago, Hyde Park Art Center, ARC, Artemisia Gallery, Chicago Cultural Center and Gwenda Jay Gallery. Later exhibitions took place at the Museum of Contemporary Art Chicago, National Academy Museum, Illinois State Museum, Frye Art Museum, the 55 Mercer (New York), Lyons Wier and Gesheidle (both Chicago) galleries, and the Riverside Arts Center, among others.

== Artwork and reception ==
Judith Raphael, Surveying the Universe, acrylic on paper, 24" x 40", 2012.

Raphael's work of the 1960s and 1970s centered on watercolor paintings of lush vegetation: spindly, complex organizations of plants rendered largely in greens and browns. By the early 1980s, she began to incorporate creatures—a taxidermied fox, iguana, crow or hawk—into carefully observed watercolors of increasingly complex, staged tableaux.

By the early 1990s, Raphael turned to the figure, taking childhood as a subject in sometimes-startling paintings examining myths and realities of gender and identity. These narrative works depicted impassive figures—most often girls and young women in enigmatic, vaguely disturbing or ritual-like situations with older men or boys (e.g., Daddy's Girl or In Motion, 1996). Carol Becker wrote of the former, "Enigmatic paintings like this one capture the dramatic and traumatic experiences of childhood, whose residue a child carries into adulthood and the adult often cannot transcend"; New York Times critic Vivien Raynor described such works as "capturing the weirdness of Balthus." Raphael extended this theme in a series of large, ambiguous beach paintings depicting play in Lake Michigan that suggested imminent danger and adult neglect (e.g., Falling Child, 1992).

In the latter 1990s, her adult figures receded and the images took a more raucous turn, depicting young girls as athletic, confident and fearless in heroic, mythological poses from art history that in their transformation evoked both lost innocence and budding aggression and power. Paintings like Victory Parade or Conquest and Clemency (both 1998) referenced celebratory tableaux of Roman soldiers returning from battle; in the latter, a girl fearlessly rides a fierce pit bull into a group of girls playing with a hula hoop, leotard and microphone. While these works broke from stereotypical representations of girlhood, Raphael suggested the ongoing burden of history with ghostly backdrops of anachronistic gender symbols and scenes that one review likened to "kiddie wallpaper."

Critics such as Alan Artner noted that Raphael's subsequent work dispensed with art historical and period references and became "subtler in expression" of adolescence. It took two forms: single figures set against highly saturated, decontextualized grounds, the lack of contextual clues foregrounding contemporary stances and attitudes; and larger, multi-figure scenes depicting active or aggressive behavior—jumping, shouting, conversing or confronting, striking martial arts poses—that continued to break from conventional gender representation. Works such as Hang Tight or Free Fall (2008) portrayed girls skydiving, trailing smoke from their heels and doing wheelies on bicycles in the open sky, unrestrained and serene, without a hint of danger. In another later series, Raphael depicted two children––her grandchildren from her late son––as vulnerable and ephemeral, yet anchored to earth, against seas of stars or lush gardens (e.g., Surveying the Universe, 2012).

== Recognition ==
Raphael has received grants and awards from the Illinois Arts Council (1984, 1987, 1990, 2002), Springfield Art Museum (1986), National Endowment for the Arts/Arts Midwest (1992) and National Academy Museum (Adolph & Clara Obrig Prize, 2004). She has been awarded artist residencies from the American Academy in Rome (visiting artist), Djerassi, Marie Walsh Sharpe Art Foundation, Rockefeller Foundation (Bellagio, Italy), Virginia Center for the Creative Arts and Yaddo. Her work belongs to the public collections of the Mary and Leigh Block Museum of Art, Rockford Art Museum, School of the Art Institute of Chicago, State of Illinois, and St. Xavier College.
