= Ringqvist =

Ringquist or Ringqvist is a Swedish surnames. Notable people with the surname include:

== Ringquist ==
- Abby Ringquist (born 1989), American ski jumper
- Elias Ringqvist (born 1981), Swedish actor
- Leif Ake Ringquist (born 1942), Swedish diplomat
- Rebecca Ringquist, American visual artist

== Ringqvist ==
- Bernt Ringqvist (1917–1966), Swedish painter
- Bertil Ringqvist (1916–1987), Swedish architect
- Charlotta Ringqvist (1800–?), Swedish artist
- Elisabeth Thand Ringqvist (born 1972), Swedish politician
- Jonas Ringqvist (born 1971), Swedish politician
- Jörgen Ringqvist (born 1966), Swedish songwriter and record producer
- Karl Ringqvist (1883–1858), Swedish politician
- Thure Ringqvist (1888–1968), Swedish engineer
- Ylva Ringqvist ten Siethoff (1921–2013), Swedish artist
