= ISEA International =

Non-profit organization founded in the Netherlands

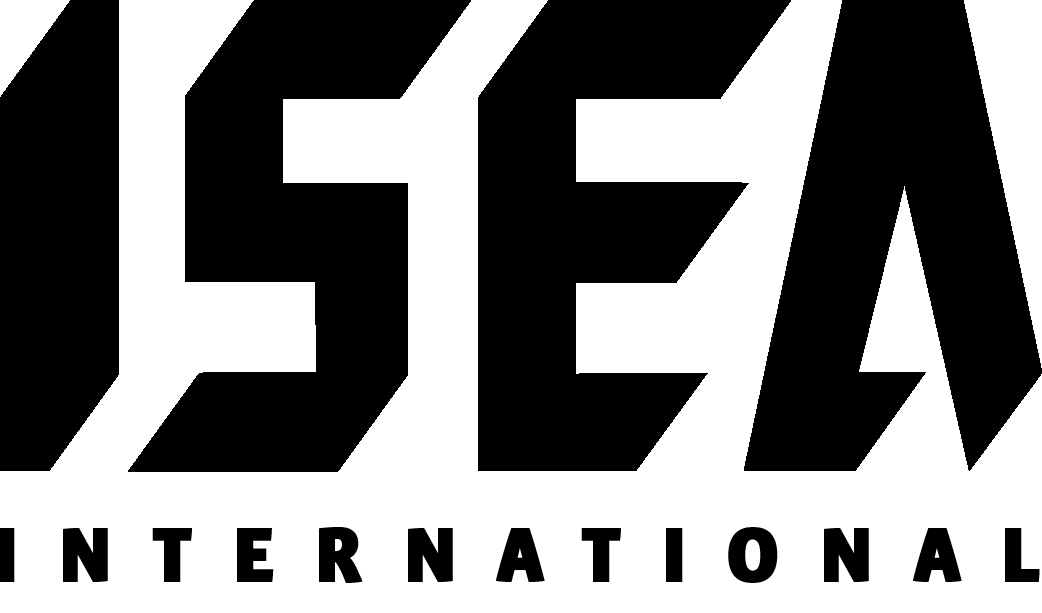
- Formation: 1990
- Founder: Theodor Hesper and Wim van der Plas
- Founded at: Netherlands
- Type: International non-profit
- Headquarters: University for the Creative Arts
- Board of directors: Erandy Vergara, Everardo Reyes, Anne Nigten, Pat Badani, Ricardo Dal Farra, Lisa Park SoYoung, Roger Malina
- Website: https://www.isea-international.org/
- Formerly called: Inter-Society for the Electronic Arts

ISEA International is an international non-profit organisation which encourages "interdisciplinary academic discourse" and exposure for "culturally diverse organisations and individuals working with art, science and technology."

ISEA International is best known for coordinating the annual International Symposium on Electronic Art (ISEA), a gathering of the international art, science and technology community. The symposium includes both an academic conference, including workshops, and artistic events, like art exhibitions, concerts & performances and events in public space. It is a nomadic event and is held in a different location every year. ISEA allows individuals and organisations from around the world to come together annually, share and experience the intersection of emerging technologies and art. ISEA includes both visual and performing art that intersect with various types of technology in its symposia. ISEA is managed by the ISEA International foundation board, who coordinate the continued occurrence of the symposium and oversees the quality of its content.

In an important move for ISEA, an agreement with University of Brighton to establish an ISEA Headquarters was signed in July 2009. ISEA HQ provides an administrative, academic and creative base for ISEA and develops a fruitful partnership with a leading research University. In 2022, a new agreement was signed with the University for the Creative Arts, which is where the new headquarters is now based.

== History ==
The symposium series began in 1988 in Utrecht, the Netherlands, in order to support the founding and maintenance of an international network of organisations and individuals active in the field of the electronic arts. The idea behind its creation was to create a network for those who are active and interested in electronic arts. The organization was later founded in 1990 in The Netherland, as an international membership association called the Inter-Society for the Electronic Arts. The Board and membership of ISEA has always been international, bringing together individuals and organisations from around the world. From the founding of ISEA until 1996 the organisation was based in the Netherlands. From 1996 to 2001, ISEA headquarters was based in Montréal, Canada. After a period of a provisional HQ again in the Netherlands, in 2008 a new Headquarters was established at the University of Brighton, United Kingdom. The Inter-Society existed for over 15 years as a membership organisation and in 2009 ISEA was changed from the association to a foundation called “ISEA International” and the headquarters moved to the UK.

The organisation is now managed by the ISEA International foundation board, whose main role is to select the host city of each symposium based on bids submitted after a Call for Candidates. The foundation board works closely with the host to ensure that the goals of ISEA are achieved. Historically the symposia were held as both a biennial and annual event. As of 2009, the symposium has been held annually again.

ISEA is one of the most prominent international events on art and technology around the world, bringing together scholarly, artistic, and scientific domains in an interdisciplinary discussion and showcase of creative productions applying new technologies in electronic art, interactivity and digital media. Each ISEA event inspires participants with new themes to showcase artistic, scientific, and technological growth by transcending historical limits.

The ISEA International Headquarters was previously hosted at the University of Brighton in the UK. As of ISEA2022 ISEA HQ is based at the University for the Creative Arts.

== International Advisory Committee ==
The Isea International Advisory Committee (IIAC) is composed of international experts from the fields of art, science and technology. Their role is to advise the ISEA International foundation board. As of 2021, the IIAC is chaired by Tanya Ravn Ag.

== ISEA Symposium Archives ==
ISEA maintains an archive with resources available to the public. Beginning in 2012, the development of a new archive commenced with text and PDF information available for the symposium proceedings, catalogs, presentation abstracts, artist statements, and workshops. A new archive is in development to include images and rich media. This new archive interconnects the data to create a myriad of ways to retrieve the information. It also has contributor pages that connect to all the papers, presentations, artworks and other contributions to the ISEA symposium. The new archive also enables the export of data for visualizations as well as a map of the location of all the contributors to the ISEA symposia. Although this new archive is currently in-progress, it is also available to the public.

== International Symposium on Electronic Art (ISEA) ==
Previous and future symposia have included:

- Utrecht, Netherlands (FISEA, 1988)
- Groningen, Netherlands (SISEA, 1990)
- Sydney, Australia (TISEA, 1992)
- Minneapolis, Minnesota, U.S. (FISEA’93)
- Helsinki, Finland (ISEA94)
- Montreal, Quebec, Canada (ISEA95)
- Rotterdam, Netherlands (ISEA96)
- Chicago, U.S. (ISEA97)
- Liverpool/Manchester, UK (ISEA98)
- Paris, France (ISEA2000)
- Nagoya, Japan (ISEA2002)
- Baltic Sea; Tallinn, Estonia; Helsinki, Finland (ISEA2004)
- San Jose, California, U.S. (ISEA2006)
- Singapore, (ISEA2008)
- Belfast, Northern Ireland, (ISEA2009)
- Ruhr Area, Germany, (ISEA2010)
- Istanbul, Turkey, (ISEA2011)
- Albuquerque, New Mexico, U.S. (ISEA2012)
- Sydney, Australia, (ISEA2013)
- Dubai, United Arab Emirates, (ISEA2014)
- Vancouver, British Columbia, Canada, (ISEA2015)
- Hong Kong SAR, People's Republic of China, (ISEA2016)
- Manizales, Colombia, (ISEA2017)
- Durban, South Africa, (ISEA2018)
- Gwangju, South Korea, (ISEA2019)
- Online Montreal, QB, Canada (ISEA2020)
- Barcelona, Spain, (ISEA2022)
- Paris, France, (ISEA2023)
- Brisbane, Queensland, Australia (ISEA2024)
- Seoul, South Korea, (ISEA2025)
