= Herbert Temple Jr. =

American art director and illustrator

Herbert Temple Jr. (July 6, 1919 – April 13, 2011) was an American art director and illustrator. He worked for Johnson Publishing Company in Chicago for 54 years, first as an illustrator hired in 1953, and then art director starting in 1967.

Publications he art directed included Ebony, Jet, Tan, Negro Digest, Ebony Jr, and Black World, as well as books from Johnson Publishing.

== Early life ==
Temple was born in Gary, Indiana, and was raised in Evanston, Illinois, where he graduated from Evanston Township High School. He served in the U.S. Army during World War II, and then attended the School of the Art Institute of Chicago with a scholarship from the GI Bill. He lived most of his adult life on the South Side of Chicago, before moving to South Holland, Michigan in his final years of life. He was the husband of poet and author Athelstan Wiggins Temple (1935-1995), whom he met while working at Johnson Publishing Co. They had one child, Janel Temple.

In Chicago, Temple was affiliated with a vibrant Black arts scene at the South Side Community Art Center (SSCAC). He connected there with such South Side figures as LeRoy Winbush (who helped him get his job at Johnson Publishing Company) and William McBride. Before working for Johnson Publishing, Temple worked at other Chicago design firms including the Container Corporation of America.

== Career ==
=== Johnson Publishing Company ===
Ebony magazine, initially modeled after Life magazine, came to represent Black success in America, with celebrities and business leaders featured prominently on covers and in articles. Design played a part in this image, and Temple was behind the scenes of many key aspects of the production from designing covers, to directing model shoots, to designing books that expanded the company's reach. Temple designed, with Norman Hunter, the company's logo and stationery, and was credited with designing all aspects of the magazines, from layout, to image selection, to occasional illustrations or photography.

While some leading Black intellectuals critiqued Johnson Publishing's consumer and celebrity content, the company's publications also played a part in the politics of Civil Rights. Temple designed many layouts that covered news of protests and Civil Rights leaders, and designed JPC publications of Civil Rights journalism such as two books by Doris E. Saunders. A rare moment when Temple's artwork was directly credited in Ebony was the cover of the August 1969 special issue on "The Black Revolution," which featured a painting signed by Temple of a Black man's serious, aggrieved face in close-up view. The painting was also printed without alteration within the magazine as the editors believed that readers might want to remove it from the magazine for framing. Temple also worked on the publication Negro Digest, and helmed the art direction when the magazine was rebranded as Black World under editor Hoyt W. Fuller. The magazine featured black artists, leaders, and poets, and adopted a Pan-Africanist aesthetic that was quite different from the look of Ebony and Jet.

Temple was also involved in Johnson Publishing projects that were targeted to children. He contributed illustrations to Dorothy W. Robinson's book The Legend of Africania, for which they received a Coretta Scott King Book Award from the American Library Association in 1975. Temple had already worked on children's illustrations as art director of Ebony Jr!, the children's magazine started in 1973, for which de painted the first three covers.

=== Other projects ===
Temple owned his own business, a card company called JanTemp Greetings. The company printed cards and illustrations with Afro-Centric themes, including "America's Favorite Pastime Coloring Book," illustrated by Athelstan Temple.

He was also a founder of Brief Reflections Nightclub, a lounge and dance club located in the South Loop of Chicago, with Douglas R. Williams, a sculptor and scholar of Black arts and history.

=== Selected works ===
==== Designer ====
- The Day They Marched by Doris E. Saunders, 1963
- The Kennedy Years and the Negro by Doris E. Saunders, 1964

==== Illustrator ====
- Negro Firsts in Sport by Andrew S. Young, 1963
- The Ebony Cookbook: A Date with a Dish by Freda De Knight, 1973
- The Legend of Africania by Dorothy W. Robinson, 1974
