= Lois Morrison =

American book artist (born 1934)

Lois Morrison (b. 1934 Belgian Congo now the Democratic Republic of the Congo) is an American book artist. She attended Mary Baldwin College, Indiana University Bloomington, and Virginia Commonwealth University. On several occasions she has collaborated with fellow book artist Julie Chen, including the 2017 volume A recuerdo for Ste. Ostrich.

Her artist's books are in the Smithsonian Libraries and Archives, the Joseph C. Sloane Art Library Collection of Artists’ Books and Zines at UNC, the School of the Art Institute of Chicago Library & Special Collections, and the National Museum of Women in the Arts.
