= Eleanor Coen =

American painter

- Eleanor Coen with her work
- Born: October 21, 1916; Normal, Illinois
- Died: July 9, 2010 (aged 93); Martha's Vineyard, Massachusetts
- Education: Art Institute of Chicago
- Known for: 20th century color lithography and painting
- Spouse: Max Kahn
- Awards: Philadelphia Print Club (1952); American Color Print Society; 1953; James Nelson Raymond Traveling Fellowship at SAIC
- Website: www.eleanorcoen.com

Eleanor Coen "Girl with Flowers (Cat)" 1959

Eleanor Coen (October 21, 1916 – July 9, 2010) was an American painter.

== Biography ==
Coen was born October 21, 1916, in Normal, Illinois. Both a student (and later teacher) at the Art Institute of Chicago, Coen studied there with Boris Anisfeld, Francis Chapin and Max Kahn. She married Kahn in 1942.

She established her art career during the great depression. In the Works Progress Administration Federal Arts Project (WPA_FAP) she and her husband Max Kahn helped forge a tradition of 20th century color lithography and painting. She was at the forefront of Chicago art in the 1940s and 1950s. Her work found inspiration the urban landscapes, her travels and the figure rendered in her signature figurative expressionist style.

Eleanor Coen "Yellow Sky" 1962

From 1939 to 1940, while a student at the Chicago Art Institute Coen participated in the Depression-era WPA Federal Art Project in Chicago. She shared a studio with Max Kahn and other artists Isadore Weiner and Misch Kohn in Chicago's South Side. There they pioneered color lithography which wasn't supported at the time at SAIC. In 1941 Eleanor was the first woman to win the James Nelson Raymond Traveling Fellowship, a $2000 first prize (for students with the best work). People who won usually went to Europe but because of the war Max and Eleanor decided to go to Mexico. They drove to Mexico with friend and fellow artist Julio de Diego, (who later married Gypsy Rose Lee). In Mexico City they lived with their close friend Alfredo Zalce, who was a founder of the Taller De Grafica Popular (TGP). Eleanor completed a number of lithographs in that time frame and in fact, was the first woman to work for the TGP. She and Max were both active members of the TGP and influenced other Chicago area artists to follow. With a close friend, artist Pablo O'Higgins, Max and Eleanor went to San Miguel de Allende where Max set up a litho studio and taught lithography at the School of Bellas Artes in San Miguel de Allende, Mexico. While there Eleanor painted a large mural which still graces a wall in the school courtyard. The mural and school are national monuments. A good friend Alfredo Zalce, was also doing a mural there at the same time. In Mexico she met other artists such as Leopoldo Méndez, and Ángel Bracho. She was especially influenced by Jose Clement Orozco for his figural style. After the war started they came back to Chicago where she and Max were married in 1942. Eleanor and Max returned to Mexico several times traveling throughout the Yucatán and staying in Campeche with their artist friend Frank Vavruska. She taught at SAIC Ox-Bow summer school of art in Saugatuck, Michigan with Francis Chapin. Eleanor and Max painted in San Francisco, Blackhawk Colorado, Santa Fe and on Martha's Vineyard where they have a studio and worked during the summers. Eleanor has had a long and successful career at the forefront of printmaking and oil painting and is a vital part of the art community. Her work appears in numerous collections and museums including the Art Institute of Chicago and the Smithsonian Institution. She has won numerous prizes including the American Color Print Society in 1953, Philadelphia Print Club in 1952 and the Chicago show. Eleanor has been called the best painter in Chicago of the 1940s & 1950s era. She has won numerous prizes and now shows at the Corbett vs. Dempsey gallery in Chicago.

Coen's work is displayed at the Smithsonian American Art Museum and Art Institute of Chicago.
