= Pat Badani =

Interdisciplinary artist (b. 1951)

- Born: Buenos Aires, Argentina
- Education: School of the Art Institute of Chicago, University of Alberta
- Known for: Photography, installation, digital art
- Style: Interdisciplinary
- Website: Pat Badani website

Pat Badani (born Buenos Aires, Argentina) is a Canadian interdisciplinary artist, writer/editor, and researcher whose works promote ecological balance and sustainable human-world relations. She is best known for utopian/dystopian themes in works dealing with human migration, globalization, connections between food and cultures, and sustainability. Art projects often include culinary art, photography, installation, digital art, internet art, mobile apps, and creative writing. Articles about her work have appeared in art magazines (Afterimage, Art Papers, Art Nexus), in journals (Leonardo), and in book chapters ("Extranjeros en la Tecnología y en la Cultura," Ed. Néstor García Canclini, Colección Fundación Telefónica/Ariel, 2009; "The Performing Observer: Essays on Contemporary Art, Performance, and Photography", Dr. Martin Patrick, Intellect, The University of Chicago Press, 2023). She is a board member of the International Symposium on Electronic Art since 2017, and former editor-in-chief of Media-N, Journal of the New Media Caucus (2010-2016), an academic art journal published in the U.S.A.

== Life ==
Pat Badani earned a BFA from the University of Alberta in Canada (1975) and an MFA from the School of the Art Institute of Chicago (SAIC), in the U.S.A. (2001). Having lived and worked in Argentina, Peru, Mexico, Canada, France, and finally in the US, Badani's experiences, observations, and research inform her creative output, which often incorporates both electronic and physical mediums.

== Work ==
Badani's work has been shown internationally in museums, art centers, and media art festivals in Mexico (Museo de Arte Moderno, Museo de Arte Contemporáneo de Monterrey, Museo del Chopo), in Argentina (Espacio Fundacion Telefónica), in Brazil (FILE-Electronic Language International Festival), in Colombia (Festival Internacional de la Imagen), in Canada (Art Souterrain Festival, Museum London, The Beaverbrook Art Gallery), the U.S.A. (Herberger Institute Night Gallery, Tarble Art Center, ELO - Electronic Literature Organization, CURRENTS New Media Festival), in France (Centre culturel canadien Paris, Maison de l’Amérique Latine, ISEA2000), in Spain (MECAD Media Center), in England (iDat Plymouth University, Stanley Picker Gallery Kingston University, Watershed Media Center), and in China at VINCI'23-Hong Kong University of Science and Technology). Her interactive, participatory projects use technology as both subject and medium, such as the 2015 installation make-a-move, a work consisting of screens displaying motion-responsive portraits whose eyes follow passerby to address concerns about electronic surveillance in public space. Al Grano (2010-2016), a 3-part art project, used the corn seed as a symbol of Mesoamerican history, culture, and agriculture in a global economy. The work includes elements that reveal – via a mobile app – the presence of genetically modified corn in breakfast cereals. Badani further explored food and sustainability in another project, Comestible: Seven Day Meal Plan (2016–present). The work lampooned dietic utopias in Western nutrition trends through an illustrated sardonic cookbook with photographs of Badani's artistically displayed meals, whimsical recipes, and packaging akin to meal subscription boxes. The artist also explored participation and interpretation of digital archives in internet-based art projects. These include Home Transfer (2000-2002); Where are you from? Stories (2002-2009); and Where Life is Better (2003). Badani's projects often occur in series and she uses the cognitive technique of “chunking” – a mental process of dividing large information into smaller “chunks” – to facilitate both creation and exhibition of her work. The artist wrote, “chunking facilitates inspection of a multifaceted subject – such as food security – with each chunk addressing a specific facet, and all chunks relating to the same nodal concept: sustainable living...when several project chunks are assembled as a group during exhibitions... viewers/participants engage in a chunking process, themselves.

== Awards ==
Badani has received awards and fellowships for her work in Canada and in the U.S.A., including 11 awards from The Canada Council for the Arts (among them, two one-year Media Arts Research-Creation awards in 2002 and in 2024, and Arts Abroad award in 2015, 2016, 2017, 2022, 2023, and 2025); an award from DCASE - Chicago Department of Cultural Affairs and Special Events (2016); a National Endowment for the Arts Fellowship at MacDowell (2016); a Harvestworks Fellowship in New York (2024), and an Illinois Arts Council award (2007). In 2011 her work was selected and registered on Creative Capital’s artists to watch list “On Our Radar.” Badani has been nominated for two merit awards, in 2010 she was nominated for an Art Matters Fellowship and in 2018 she was nominated for an (AWAW) Anonymous Was A Woman Award recognizing women of vision in the U.S.A. In 2020 her work was recognized by the Electronic Literature Lab for Advanced Inquiry into Born Digital Media alongside other international e-lit women pioneer and visionaries.
