= Rosemary Zwick =

American printmaker and sculptor

- Born: 1925
- Died: 1995 (aged 69–70)
- Education: University of Iowa; School of the Art Institute of Chicago; DePaul University; University of Illinois at Chicago
- Known for: Printmaking, sculpture
- Spouse: Sidney Zwick

Rosemary Zwick (1925–1995) was an American printmaker and sculptor.

Born in Chicago, Zwick received her BFA at the University of Iowa in 1945; her teachers there included Phillip Guston and Humberto Albrizio. She took evening classes in printmaking with Max Kahn at the School of the Art Institute of Chicago from 1946 to 1947; from 1947 to 1948 she took education courses at DePaul University, and in 1979 she studied aesthetics at the University of Illinois at Chicago. She exhibited work around the United States, and created a number of ceramic reliefs and other commissions for public spaces in Michigan and Illinois. Her work is in various public and private collections including the Art Institute of Chicago and the Brooklyn Museum. With her mother, Ida K. Pearce, Zwick ran the 4 Arts Gallery in Evanston from 1962 to 1980. She and her husband, Sidney Zwick, had four children, Andrew, Stephen, Somara, and Marissa.
