= Max Kahn =

American painter

Max Kahn (1902–2005) was a Litvak lithographer, painter and sculptor born in Slonim, Belarus in 1902. He worked until age 100 and died in 2005 at the age of 103. He was one of a small group of lithographers in the late 1940s and 1950s demonstrating the self-expressive qualities of the medium.

== Life and work ==
Max Kahn went to the United States in 1907 studying art at Bradley University, went to Paris in 1926–1928, where he studied primarily sculpture with Charles Despiau and Antoine Bourdelle and drawing with Othon Friesz at the Academy Suede West on the Rive Droite. In 1935 he met Eleanor Coen, a lithographer and painter, whom he later married. They both went to the Chicago Art Institute where he studied and later taught.

In 1939 Kahn taught a four-week course at the Herron School of Art. Eleanor Coen was on the WPA Federal Arts project from 1939 to 1940. and both she and Kahn were registered WPA artists. From the 1930s to early 1940 Kahn was the head of Chicago's WPA Art Print Department with Eleanor Coen at the Art Institute of Chicago. One of their WPA murals, painted in 1940, was discovered and restored in the 1990s. In 1941 after Eleanor won a fellowship they travelled to San Miguel de Allende in Mexico. Max set up the printmaking studio and taught printmaking at the Universitaria de Bellas Artes, which had recently opened. The school is now a national monument. Political prints collected in Mexico by Kahn and Coen were exhibited at the Museum of Fine Arts, Houston in 2006. In 1942 after war started, Max and Eleanor returned to the USA, where they married. In the summer of 1942 they taught at Oxbow Summer School of painting at Saugatuck where Francis Chapin ran the summer school. In 1944 when Francis Chapin retired from the Art Institute he recommended Max for the job of teaching lithography, which Kahn did into the 60's.

Carl Zigrosser, a friend of Carl Shnewind, the curator of the Art Institute, encouraged Max to show his prints at Weyhe Gallery in New York, which specialized in exhibiting prints. This show in 1946 was the first large one-man show of color lithographs in this country. It was a very successful show from which New York's Metropolitan Museum and Museum of Modern Art bought several of Kahn's lithographs. His work is internationally collected and is now handled at Corbett vs. Dempsey gallery in Chicago. See www.maxkahn.com for more information.

Kahn's works were shown in group exhibitions:

- 1939: Whitney Museum of American Art; Art Institute of Chicago; Pennsylvania Academy of the Fine Arts
- 1939: World's Fair, New York City
- 1947–1951, 1958, 1960: Pennsylvania Academy of the Fine Arts Annuals
- 1947, 1959: Corcoran Gallery, Washington, D.C.

His work is held in the collections of the Illinois State Museum, the Fine Arts Museums of San Francisco, the National Gallery of Canada and The Art Institute of Chicago. Among his pupils was Rosemary Zwick.

== Books ==
- James Watrous, American Printmaking: a century of American printmaking, 1880-1980, (Madison, Wis. : University of Wisconsin Press, 1984.)ISBN 0-299-09680-7, ISBN 978-0-299-09680-9 Chapter 6, Printmaking in the 1950s, p. 183.
- David Acton, The Stamp of Impulse: abstract expressionist prints, (New York : Hudson Hills Press; Worcester, Mass. : In Association with the Worcester Art Museum, ©2001) ISBN 1-55595-213-5, ISBN 978-1-55595-213-6 pp. 104, 132
- Peter H ed Falk, Who was who in American art, 1564-1975 : 400 years of artists in America, (Madison, Conn. : Sound View Press, 1999.)ISBN 0-932087-57-4, ISBN 978-0-932087-57-7, Vol. II:G-O, p. 1780.
