= Joyce Neimanas =

American artist (born 1944)

- Born: Joyce Adduci; January 22, 1944 (age 82); Chicago, IL
- Education: School of the Art Institute of Chicago
- Known for: Photography
- Spouse: Robert Heinecken
- Website: joyceneimanas.com

Joyce Neimanas (born January 22, 1944) is an American artist known for her unorthodox approach to photography and mixed-media works.

== Personal life ==
Born in Chicago, Illinois, Neimanas lived in Los Angeles, California for ten years before moving to New Mexico with her husband Robert Heinecken, whom she met in 1976 while she was teaching at the School of the Art Institute of Chicago (SAIC). She and her husband split their time between Los Angeles and Chicago before they moved to Albuquerque, New Mexico in 2004.

== Education and career ==
Neimanas received her Bachelor of Fine Arts in 1966 and, in 1969, her Masters in Fine Arts from SAIC, where she studied with Barbara Crane and Kenneth Josephson.

== Work ==
Neimanas has spent much of her career experimenting with making photographic images without the use of a camera. Recurrent themes in her imagery include the anxiety of personal relationships, male/female stereotypes, and contemporary gender roles. Her digitally created work uses familiar images from advertising, art history, and pop culture. Her unconventional style incorporates negatives by anonymous photographers, torn prints, and rephotographed pictures. By hand-coloring or drawing on the surfaces of her prints, she creates a tension between the photograph as an art object and as a reproduction of reality. Similarly, her collages of Polaroid SX70 prints create surfaces that question the relationship between art and real life.

In 1970 Neimanas joined the staff at SAIC, where she taught for 35 years and was chair of the photography department. She taught in the photography area of the Art and Art History Department at the University of New Mexico until retiring in 2010.

== Exhibitions ==
Neimanas has received three National Endowment for the Arts Awards. Solo exhibitions of her work have been held at the Oakland Museum of California, the Center for Creative Photography, and Gallery 954 in Chicago. She has also exhibited at Cerritos College Fine Arts Gallery, California; Center for Photography at Woodstock; California State University, Sacramento; Presentation House, Vancouver; and Rhode Island School of Design; among many others. Her work is in a number of American museums, including the Museum of Contemporary Art, Chicago; The Art Institute of Chicago; the Center for Creative Photography; The Minneapolis Institute of Arts; The Museum of Fine Arts, Houston; and the Los Angeles County Museum of Art.

Neimanas has received numerous awards and grants including the Aaron Siskind Foundation, Individual Photographer's Fellowship; Computer Grant, Apple Corporation; Illinois Academy of Fine Arts Award; School of the Art Institute of Chicago Instructional Enrichment Grant; and the National Endowment for the Arts, Visual Arts Fellowship.
