= D'Angelo Lovell Williams =

American photographer

D'Angelo Lovell Williams (born 1992) is an American photographer, living in Brooklyn, New York who has made work about queer Black life. In 2022 their book Contact High was published.

== Early life and education ==
Williams was born in Jackson, Mississippi. In 2015 they earned a BFA in photography from Memphis College of Art in Memphis, Tennessee and in 2018 a MFA in art photography from Syracuse University, Syracuse, New York. They also attended Skowhegan School of Art in 2018.

== Life and work ==
Williams is a Black, queer artist whose artwork uses photography to explore queer intimacy.

Their work was included in the 2020 exhibition and related publication, Young Gifted and Black: A New Generation of Artists, curated by Antwaun Sargent and Matt Wycoff from the Lumpkin-Boccuzzi Family Collection of Contemporary Art at Lehman College from February to May 2020.

The series Papa Don't Preach, according to Maia Rae Bachman writing for Musée Magazine, uses portraits of Black queer intimacy to explore "feelings of closeness through kinship."

"By capturing images of their body in different settings, domestic and public, Williams centers their series around an ethereal realm, one where Black people can examine the generational traumas of the past, and traumas of the present day. With such a diverse range of poses, and subjects, they show a space of exploration for Black and queer bodies, whose narrative has too often been obscured by white storytelling."

The book Contact High (2022) explores queer Black communities that Williams feels a part of. Williams appears in the majority of the photographs with a cast of supporting characters. According to Ravi Ghosh writing for i-D, "a few distinct features stand out: the variety of full-body poses, the connection to the land and vegetation, the air of self-destruction. D'Angelo's unbroken stare into the camera becomes this set's defining quality." Marigold Warner writes in the British Journal of Photography that

"the images are layered with meanings relating to queerness, Blackness, gender, history and Williams' own experiences. [. . .] These dichotomies exist throughout Williams' images: sex and violence; power and subservience; control and chaos; ecstasy and pain", of which Williams says "A lot of our narratives haven't been our own as Black queer people, and that's what I wanted to get at."

== Personal life ==
Williams lives in Brooklyn, New York. They were diagnosed with HIV in January 2020.

== Publications ==
=== Books by Williams ===
- Contact High. London: Mack, 2022. ISBN 978-1-913620-62-2. With writing by Tiona Nekkia McClodden.

=== Zines by Williams ===
- Only In America. New York: Dashwood, 2020. Edition of 500 copies.

== Solo exhibitions ==
- Only In America, Higher Pictures Generation, New York, 2017
- Papa Don't Preach, Higher Pictures Generation, New York, 2020
