= Michiko Itatani =

- Born: 1948 (age 77–78); Osaka, Japan
- Occupation: Artist
- Years active: 1973–present
- Website: http://www.michikoitatani.com

Michiko Itatani (born 1948) is an American artist, based in Chicago, who was born in Osaka, Japan. After she received her BFA (1974) and MFA (1976) at the School of the Art Institute of Chicago in 1974 and 1976 respectively, she returned to her alma mater in 1979 to teach in the Painting and Drawing department. Through her work, Itatani explores identity, continuation, and finding one's way in the modern world. Her work depicts nude figures in an expressionist style. Itatani has received the Illinois Arts Council Artist's Fellowship, the National Endowment for the Arts Fellowship and the John Simon Guggenheim Fellowship. Her work is collected in many museums, including the Art Institute of Chicago; the Museum of Contemporary Art, Olympic Museum, Switzerland; Villa Haiss Museum, Germany; Musée national des beaux-arts du Québec, Canada; Museu D'art Contemporani (MACBA), Spain; and the National Museum of Contemporary Art, South Korea.

== Exhibitions ==
- Solo & two person exhibitions
  - 2016
  - Linda Warren Projects, Chicago, Illinois 9/9-10/22
  - 2015
  - Bradley University Heuser Art Gallery, Peoria, Illinois "Personal Codes III". 8/1-9/17
  - 2014
  - Sherry Leedy Contemporary, Kansas City, Missouri "Itatani & Borgenicht"
  - South Bent Museum of Art, Indiana "Michiko Itatani and Jake Webster: Passages"
  - 2013
  - Linda Warren Projects, Chicago Illinois, 9/6-10/19, "Cosmic Kaleidoscope"
  - 2012
  - Goshen College Art Gallery, Goshen, Indiana "Cosmic Wanderlust"
  - Rockford College Art Gallery, Rockford, Illinois "Cosmic Wanderlust"*
  - Printworks, Chicago, Illinois "CTRL-Home/Echo" Printworks, Inc. (also 2008, 05, 02, 1997, 93, 91)
  - 2011
  - O"Cconor Gallery, Dominican University, Illinois "Cosmic Commentaries", with Cullen Washington
  - Kendall Gallery, Ferris University, Grand Rapids, Michigan "Cosmic Theater"
  - University Club, Chicago, Illinois
  - "Visual Analogies and Inquiries: the Work of Michiko Itatani and Birgitta Weimer"
  - Milwaukee Institute of Arts & Design, Milwaukee, Wisconsin,
  - 2010
  - Olympia Centre (via Nixon Associate) Chicago, Illinois
  - Handwerker Gallery, Ithaca College, New York "Personal Codes"
  - Red Line, Denver, Colorado "Close Binary"
  - Corbett vs Dempsey, Chicago, Illinois "Miniature Itatani – Cosmic Wanderlust"
  - Illinois Wesleyan University, Bloomington, Illinois "Cosmic Wanderlust"
  - Walsh Gallery, Chicago, Illinois "Personal Codes"
  - 2009
  - Gaddis Geeslin Gallery, Sam Houston University, Texas, "Cosmic Theater"
  - 2008
  - Flatfile Contemporary, Chicago, Illinois, "Cosmic Theater II"
  - Printworks, Inc., Chicago, Illinois, HyperBaroque"
  - 2007
  - Eastern Kentucky University, Richmond, Kentucky, "Michiko Itatani"
  - 2006
  - Indiana State University Gallery, Terre Haute, Indiana "Michiko Itatani
  - Flatfile Contemporary, Chicago, Illinois "Cosmic Theatre"
  - Prudential Building, Chicago, Illinois "Michiko Itatani"
  - 2005
  - H.F. Johnson Gallery, Carthage College, Kenosha, Wisconsin, "Virtual Signs / Witness"
  - Shirley/Jones Gallery, Yellowsprings, Ohio
  - 2004
  - Flatfile Contemporary, Chicago, Illinois
  - Sherry Leedy Gallery, Kansas City, Missouri
  - 2003
  - Daum Museum of Contemporary Art, Sedalia, Missouri
  - Spartanburg Museum of Art, Spartanburg, South Carolina
  - 2002
  - Fassbender/Stevens Gallery, Chicago, Illinois
  - University of Wyoming Art Museum, Laramie, Wyoming
  - 2001
  - Galerie Bhak, Seoul, Korea
  - Fassbender Gallery, Chicago, Illinois (also 1999, 97, 95)
  - Pittsburg State University, Pittsburg, Kansas
  - 2000
  - University of Missouri, St. Louis, Missouri
  - Frauen Museum, Bonn, Germany
  - Kent State University, Kent, Ohio
  - 1999
  - Elmhurst Museum, Elmhurst, Illinoiso
  - 1998
  - Gallery 312, Chicago, Illinois (also 1994)
  - Indianapolis Art Center, Indianapolis, Indiana
  - Tokoha Museum, Shizuoka, Japano
  - 1997
  - Charleston Heights Arts Center, Las Vegas, Nevada
  - Galeria Senda, Barcelona, Spain
  - 1996
  - Gallery 1, Shinjuku Park Tower, Tokyo, Japan
  - Gallery B.A.I., New York City
  - 1995
  - The John G. Blank Center, Michigan City, Indiana
  - Nexus Contemporary Art Center, Atlanta, Georgia
  - 1994
  - Wright Museum of Art, Beloit, Wisconsin, "Ed Paschke/Michiko Itatani"
  - 1993
  - Deson-Saunders Gallery, Chicago (also1991, 90)
  - 1992
  - University of Wisconsin, Milwaukee Art Museum, Wisconsin
  - Muskegon Museum of Art, Muskegon, Michigan
  - Chicago Cultural Center, Chicago, "Michiko Itatani: Paintings since 1984"
  - 1991
  - McIntosh Gallery(Museum), University of Western Ontario, Canada
  - Second Street Gallery, Charlottesville, Virginia
  - 1990
  - Gallery Sho, San Francisco, California
  - Amano Gallery, Osaka, Japan (also 1988)
  - Kyoni Gallery, Tokyo, Japan (also 1988)
  - ABC (Asahi Broadcasting) Gallery, Osaka, Japan
  - Anita Shapolsky Gallery, New York City
  - 1989
  - University of Colorado Gallery, Bolder, Colorado
  - 1988
  - Musée du Québec, Quebec City, Canada
  - Marianne Deson Gallery, Chicago (also 1987, 84, 82, 80)
  - 1987
  - Rockford Art Museum, Rockford, Illinois
  - 1985
  - Alternative Museum, New York City
- Group Exhibitions
  - 2015
  - "Roots" Linda Warren Projects, Chicago, Illinois, 6/19-8/17
  - 2014
  - "Contemporary Painting", St. Francis University Gallery, Fort Wayne, Indiana, 11/8-12/20
  - "Nanjing International Art Festival-Exhibition", Nanjing, China
  - "The Gift of Broken Tracking Devices: Thanking with our hands" -collaboration-
  - Michiko Itatani / Judith A Kasen / Mt Coast, Experimental Sound Studio, Chicago, Illinois, 1/25-3/9
  - 2013
  - "Through The Ages: 100 Years of RAM", Rockford Art Museum, Illinois
  - "Inventory-EAM Collection", Elmhurst Art Museum, Illinois
  - "ArtWork 6", Sullivan Galleries, SAIC, Chicago, Illinois
  - 2012
  - " "Face Forward, The art of the Self-Portrait", Printworks Inc, Chicago Illinois 11/30-2/9, 2013
  - "Art on Paper: Prints, Drawings and Photographs" Block Museum, Evanston Illinois
  - "Mutuality - Itatani / Krantz / Senseman" Ukrainian Institute of Modern Art, Chicago, Illinois
  - "Itatani / Peltz / Rizzo / Rooney", Metropolitan Capital, Chicago, Illinois
  - 2011
  - "The Object Transcended" Tory Folliard Gallery, Milwaukee, Wisconsin
  - "International Paper Art Exhibition and Symposium", Chung Shan National Gallery, Taipei, Taiwan
  - "40/40", Ukrainian Institute of Modern Art, Chicago, Illinois
  - "Irritable Abstraction", Julius Caesar, Chicago, Illinois
  - 2010
  - "Spaces Within" Rockford Art Museum, Rockford, Illinois
  - "25th Anniversary Invitational", Sherry Leedy Contemporary, Missouri
  - 2009
  - "New Realities", New Gallery, Houston, Texas
  - "Faculty Projects", Betty Rymer Gallery, The School of the Art Institute of Chicago, Illinois
  - "Lipstick Traces", Daum Museum, Sedalia, Missouri
  - "Arp's Atlas of Peculiar Galaxie", Schneider Museum of Art, Ashland, Oregon
  - 2008
  - "Ahh…Decadance", Sallivan Galleries, The School of the Art Institute of Chicago, Illinois
  - 2007
  - "From Concept to Collection", Elmhurst Art Museum, Elmhurst, Illinois
  - "Collector's Choices", Anita Shapolsky Gallery, New York, New York
  - "Fragments of Change", Earnest Rubenstain Gallery, Educational Alliance, New York, New York
  - 4 person show(Michiko Itatani, Carrie Moyer, Sheils Pepe, Christy Rupp)
  - 2006
  - "Transfigure" GwendaJay/Addington Gallery, Chicago, Illinois
  - "An Invitational Exhibition of Contemporary American Art", National Academy Museum, New York, New York
  - 2005
  - " Sensuous Delights", LoPressionism Gallery, Melbourne, Florida
  - "The Art of the Bookplate", Printworks, Chicago, Illinois
  - 2004
  - "Michiko Itatani/Pavel Kraus - Monuments & Fragments" Oakton Community College, Des Plane, Illinois
  - "That 70s Show: The Age of Pluralism in Chicago", Northern Indiana Arts Association, Munster, Indiana
  - 2003
  - "Retrospective", Gallery 312, Chicago, Illinois
  - 2002
  - "Artists to Artists", Marie Walsh Sharp Foundation, ACE Gallery, New York City, New York
  - 2001
  - "synesthesia", Wood Street Gallery, Chicago, Illinois
  - "Dialogue", (4 person show), Anita Shapolsky Gallery, New York City, New York
  - 2000
  - "Generations", AIR Gallery, New York City, New York
  - 1999
  - "Synergy -F a/e int : A Collaboration-", Milwaukee Institute of Art & Design, Milwaukee, Wisconsin
  - "Chicago Subjects", West Virginia University, West Virginia
  - 1998
  - "The Third Kind of Encounter", Taipei Gallery, New York City
  - "98 Invitational Showcase", University of Bridgeport, Connecticut
  - 1996
  - "Art in Chicago 1945-95", Museum of Contemporary Art, Chicago
  - "Second Sight: Printmaking in Chicago 1935-95"
  - Mary & Leigh Block Museum, Northwestern University, Illinois
  - "Tornado Warning", Muskegon Museum of Art, Michigan
  - "Rapture", San Francisco State University, California
  - 1994
  - "Object Lessons", DePaul University, Chicago
  - 1993
  - "M’aidez/Mayday", Phyllis Kind Gallery, New York City
  - 1992
  - "From America’s Studio: Drawing New Conclusions", Betty Rymer Gallery, Chicago
  - 1991
  - "Burning in Hell", Franklin Furnace, New York City
  - "Outspoken Women", Intermedia Arts, Minneapolis
  - 1990
  - "Osaka Triennale ‘90", Osaka, Japan
  - "Locations of Desire" (Bramson/ Itatani/ Klement), State of Illinois Gallery, Chicago travelled to Illinois State Museum, Springfield, Illinois
  - "Locations of Desire" (Bramson/ Itatani/ Klement), Brody’s Gallery, Washington D.C.
  - 1989
  - "Chicago", Maier Museum, Virginia
  - "aja V", Japan American Center, Los Angeles
  - "Chicago Work", Erie Museum, Erie, Pennsylvania
  - 1988
  - "Focus", Aspen Museum, Aspen, Colorado
  - 1987
  - "Silverpoint", Leslie Cecile Gallery, New York City
  - "Chicago Contrast", Amerika Haus, Berlin, Stuttgart, Munchen
  - "Two Decades of Painting in Chicago", Terra Museum of American Art, Chicago
  - 1986
  - "Painting/Sculpture Today ‘86", Indianapolis Museum, Indianapolis, Indiana
  - 1985
  - "Chicago & Vicinity", Art Institute of Chicago, Chicago
  - "Fine Line: Drawing with Silver in America", Norton Museum, Florida
  - 1984
  - "Alternative Spaces", Museum of Contemporary Art, Chicago

== Collections ==
- Olympic Museum, Lausanne, Switzerland
- McIntosh Gallery, University of Western Ontario, London, Canada
- American Embassy Permanent Collection, Brasilia, Brazil
- Museu D’art Contemporani (MACBA), Barcelona, Spain
- Villa-Haiss-Museum, Zell am Harmersback, Germany
- Frauen Museum, Bonn, Germany
- Musée national des beaux-arts du Québec, Quebec, Canada
- Tokoha Museum, Shizuoka, Japan
- Shizuoka University of Art & Culture, Shizuoka, Japan
- National Museum of Contemporary Art, Seoul, Korea
- Art Institute of Chicago, Chicago, Illinois
- Museum of Contemporary Art, Chicago, Illinois
- Illinois State Museum, Springfield, Illinois
- Koehnline Museum of Art, Des Plaines, Illinois
- Elmhurst Art Museum, Elmhurst, Illinois
- Mary & Leigh Block Museum, Northwestern University, Evanston, Illinois
- Crocker Art Museum, Sacramento, California
- Schneider Museum of Art, Ashland, Oregon
- Nevada Museum of Art, Reno, Nevada
- Muskegon Museum of Art, Muskegon, Michigan
- Kresge Art Museum, Michigan State University, Michigan
- Cincinnati Art Museum, Ohio
- Wright Museum, Beloit, Wisconsin
- Daum Museum, Sedalia, Missouri
- Maier Museum of Art, Charlottesville, Virginia
- Erie Art Museum, Erie, Pennsylvania
- Harold Washington Library, Chicago, Illinois
- University of Colorado CU Art Museum, Boulder, Colorado
- Union League Club of Chicago, Illinois
- University Club of Chicago, Illinois
- Loyola University Museum of Art, Illinois

== Works and publications ==
- James Yood, Michiko Itatani: "Cosmic Kaleidoscope" at Linda Warren Projects, Art Ltd, Nov/Dec 2013
- Victor Cassidy, Coming to Terms-Personal Codes, Feb, 2010
- Robin Dluzen, Michiko Itatani at Walsh, Feb 22, 2010
- Jinny Berg, Michiko Itatani, New Series at Walsh Gallery, Feb., 2010
- Darrel Robert, ArtStyle, Michiko Itatani: Lyrical Works on Paper, March 3, 2008
- Margaret Howkins, "Michiko Itatani/Flatfile", ARTnews, June 2006, p. 160
- Garret Holg, "Michiko Itatani/Flatfile", ARTnews, Feb. 2005, pp. 134–5
- "Looking Forward - Michiko Itatani - Daum Museum of Contemporary Art", Dialogue Oct. 2003
- Kristen Brooke Schleifer, Art on Paper, July–August, 2002 Claire Wolf Krantz, Manhattan Arts International, 2002
- Lisa Stein, Chicago Trubune, September 6, 2002
- Von Heldrun Wirth, "Das Ende der Kindheit", Kölnische/Bonner Rundschau, May 31, 2000
- Alan Artner, "Friday Guide", Chicago Tribune, September 18, 1998
- James Yood, "Michiko Itatani", Artforum, March 1994
- Gerret Holg, "Michiko Itatani", Art News, April 1992
- Katherine Cook, "In Search of a New Cosmology", Artweek, October 4, 1990
- Michael Weizenback, "Debut with a Difference", Washington Post, September 22, 1990
- Kathryn Hixson, "Michiko Itatani", Arts Magazine, 1990
- Paul Krainak, "Itatani’s Mortal Apologue", Artpapers, 1989
- Haruo Sanda, Mainichi Shinbun, August 23, 1988
- Buzz Spector, "Michiko Itatani", Artforum, May, 1987
- Kim Levin, "ARTWALK, Michiko Itatani, Alternative Museum", Village Voice, December 3, 1985
- Michael Bonesteel, "Michiko Itatani & Michael Brakke", Art in America, May, 1986
- Judith Russi Kirshner, "Michiko Itatani", Artforum, March, 1985
- Charlotte Moser, "Michiko Itatani", Art News, March, 1985
