= Rika Burnham =

American museum educator

Rika Burnham is head of education at the Frick Collection in New York City. In 2018, she was a guest scholar at the Getty Research Institute. Previously, Burnham worked as the project director of the Teaching Institute for Museum Education at the School of the Art Institute of Chicago, as a museum educator at the Metropolitan Museum of Art, and as an adjunct professor at Teachers College, Columbia University. She is a widely published scholar in the field of Museum education.

== Early life and education ==
Burnham was born in New York City and grew up in suburban New York state. She completed her bachelor's degree in art history at Harvard University. In a recent interview for the Archive of Museum Education, Burnham reflected on a course she took at Harvard titled "Design Principles," a descendant of the Bauhaus movement. She identified this course as " the first time I had ever looked at something, for a long time, lovingly, and with questions." After graduating, Burnham interned at the Philipsburg Manor House in Sleepy Hollow, New York. As a young woman, Burnham studied dance with Merce Cunningham and Martha Graham. Between 1975 and 1990, she worked as a professional dancer and choreographer with her dance group, the Burnham Company.

== Career in museum education ==
In 1986, one year after graduating from Harvard, Rika Burnham completed a summer internship at the Metropolitan Museum of Art. She used her experience as a dancer to lead gallery interventions for the Arts Awareness Program under the direction of Philip Yenawine. At the end of her internship, Burnham continued working at the Met through the Rockefeller Fellowship in Museum Education. Burnham also taught art education courses at Teachers College until 2008, at the invitation of Professor Judith Burton. She continued on at the Met until 2008, when she became the head of education at the Frick Collection. Burnham spearheaded a major overhaul of the Frick's educational programming, including the professionalization of their lecture program, the introduction of a paid museum education internship program and the institution of a monthly free evening. Since 2016, Burnham has taught a course called "The Literature of Art" for Columbia University's Master of Science in Narrative Medicine. Until 2018, Burnham worked as the head of the Teaching Institute for Museum Education at the SAIC, where she applied some of the arts awareness strategies she developed at the Met.

== Collaboration with Elliot Kai-Kee ==
Burnham and Elliott Kai-Kee, both faculty members at the School of the Art Institute of Chicago's Teaching Institute in Museum Education (TIME), have co-written a PROSE Award-winning book, Teaching in the Art Museum: Education as Experience (2011). They have also published two articles together: "The Art of Teaching in the Museum" (2005), and "Museum Education and the Project of Interpretation in the Twenty-First Century" (2007). In their work, Burnham and Kai-Kee expound upon hermeneutics, or the theory of interpretation. They identify the German philosopher Hans-Georg Gadamer as an intellectual antecedent. The impact of their work has been recognized by both practitioners of gallery teaching and scholars of Art History.

== Professional organizations ==
- Art Education Association (AEA)
- College Art Association (CAA)
- American Alliance of Museums (AAM)
- Forum for Leadership in American Museum Education (FLAME)
- New York City Museum Educators Roundtable (NYCMER)
- Museum Educators Roundtable (MER)

== Publications ==
- Raditsa, Bosiljka, Rebecca Arkenberg, Rika Burnham, Deborah Krohn, Kent Lydecker, and Teresa Russo. The Art of Renaissance Europe: A Resource for Educators. New York: Metropolitan Museum of Art, 2000.
- Burnham, Rika and Elliot Kai-Kee. "The Art of Teaching in the Museum." The Journal of Aesthetic Education, Spring, 2005, Vol. 39, No. 1, pp. 65-76.
- Burnham, Rika and Elliot Kai-Kee. "Museum Education and the Project of Interpretation in the Twenty-First Century." The Journal of Aesthetic Education. Summer, 2007, Vol. 41, No. 2, Pp. 11-13.
- Burnham, Rika. "The Barnes Foundation: A Place for Teaching." The Journal of Museum Education, Fall, 2007, Vol. 32, No. 3, Place-Based Education and the Museum, pp. 221-232.
- Burnham, Rika and Elliot Kai-Kee. Teaching in the Art Museum: Education as Experience. Los Angeles: Getty, 2011.
