= Don Balke =

American painter (born 1933)

Don Balke (born 1933) is an American artist. He is best known for his watercolor wildlife art and scenic oil paintings.

== Life and career ==
Balke, the youngest of ten children, grew up on a farm in northern backcountry of Wisconsin. His family was completely dependent on the land; they tapped trees to make maple syrup; used crosscut saws for logging and horses for their farmwork; they raised crops for themselves and as income.

His upbringing instilled in him a love of nature and wildlife. He received his first art award in a Wisconsin state-sponsored art contest while at elementary school for a painting of a black bear roaming in the woods.

After serving in the US Army, he married Barbara Schernick and they moved to Chicago where he enrolled in the Academy of Fine Arts, now known as the School of the Art Institute of Chicago. During his time at the academy, he specialized in still-life paintings. After graduating, he was hired by a Chicago illustrating studio and eventually moved back to Wisconsin where he worked as a commercial art director. He won many awards for his work as an art director and illustrator. On his own time, late in the night, he painted and developed his skills as a wildlife artist. After 17 years, he left his work as an art director to devote himself completely to watercolors and wildlife art.

By 1979, they had six children and a home in the village of Thiensville, Wisconsin. Balke's love of nature took him to the NC mountains where he bought 200 acres (0.81 km^{2}) in McDowell County and built a home. In 1985, a gallery was added and the Don Balke Wildlife Gallery was opened.

In 1987, his work was chosen as the illustration for the official NC Zoo poster. In 1992, the United States Post Office issued a series of first-class postage stamps portraying five different species of hummingbirds designed by Balke.

Balke travels to Africa, Australia, Ireland, the Caribbean, and across the 50 United States for inspiration and research. His wife, Barbara Schernick Balke, does extensive research on the animals and their habitats in preparation for the paintings and does much of the photography on research trips.

He is best known for his detailed and realistic watercolor paintings portraying wildlife in their natural environment. In 2000, he transitioned to a more impressionistic style with oils portraying scenes from Yosemite National Park in California, Ocracoke Island on the Outer Banks, and Grandfather Mountain in North Carolina.

== Works ==
During the 1980s, Balke researched and painted most of the wildlife of the United States and their habitats and produced hundred of paintings in the following series:

- Animals of the 50 States, sanctioned by the National Audubon Society
- Wildlife of the 50 States, offered through the National Wildlife Federation
- Birds and Flowers of Canada
- Songbirds of the 50 States
- Trees of the 50 States
