= Robert E. Paige =

Artist (b. 1936)

- Born: Robert Earl Paige; November 27, 1936 (age 89); Woodlawn, Chicago, U.S.
- Education: School of the Art Institute of Chicago
- Occupations: Multi-disciplinary artist and arts educator

Robert Earl Paige (born November 27, 1936) is an American multi-disciplinary artist and arts educator working across textile design, painting, collage, and sculpture based in Woodlawn, Chicago, where he was born. As an artist and textile designer allied with the Black Arts Movement, Robert E. Paige trained at the School of the Art Institute of Chicago and worked at the architecture firm Skidmore, Owings & Merrill, Sears Roebuck & Company and Fiorio Milano design house in Italy.

Paige was raised in Chicago's South Side, where he continues to live and work, further developing his longstanding career in the decorative arts. His work visually and conceptually interrogates political and cultural themes that reflect both historical and contemporary African-American art references, as well as traditional textile practices of West Africa.

== Career ==
For much of his career, Robert E. Paige considered himself a "ghost artist", as much of his work went into circulation without the attachment of his name as a designer, although his "Kool-Aid Color" textile designs helped popularize West African patterns to American shoppers. Paige first worked as an interior designer at the architecture firm Skidmore, Owings & Merrill, before studying textile design at the School of the Art Institute of Chicago (SAIC) under quilt maker Grace Earl. While at SAIC, he became inspired by the abstract and symbolic nature of African art at the Art Institute of Chicago, and began collecting photographs and slides of African sculpture at the museum, which would later inspire much of his professional work. After receiving his BFA in 1964, Paige found himself at the center of Chicago's Black Arts Movement, helping to create a new Black design aesthetic that links to many spheres of art and cultural production today.

Paige was also a participating member of AfriCOBRA, a coalition of Black artists in Chicago that was deeply embedded in Black Chicago culture,—representing the community they lived in as well as cultivating a larger Black aesthetic that was absent from the mainstream art scene and imagination. In a 2022 interview with Architectural Digest, he said of the time: "Chicago was abuzz with creativity, camaraderie, and collaboration. We were on fire." AfriCOBRA defined their mission as “an approach to image making which would reflect and project the moods, attitudes, and sensibilities of African Americans independent of the technical and aesthetic structures of Euro-centric modalities.”

In 1973, Paige was invited to the West Coast of Africa by Sears Roebuck & Company, as they were in need of reaching the African-American consumer. Thus, The Dakkabar Collection was born and was eventually circulated in 126 Sears, Roebuck stores in 56 cities throughout the United States, inspired by his time in Dakar, Senegal. While in Africa, Paige toured textile manufacturing facilities that included the silk-screening process and their studios. This collection of fabrics and home furnishings was sold in 56 cities and 130 stores around the country. According to an interview in 1973 with The New York Times, the purpose of the collection, as stated by Paige, was to involve black culture in home furnishings designs “so the black homemaker can find something that speaks directly to her."

Soon afterwards, Paige ventured to Milan, Italy, to sell pattern designs for manufacturing scarves and dress fabrics for the house of Fiorio Milano, which helped expand his work to a global audience. Upon returning to the United States, he consistently participated in exhibitions, lectures and workshops, from the elementary school level to college and universities. Paige was also a resident artist in the Cabrini Green neighborhood, and was very involved with the Chicago non-profit Gallery 37.

He is now an artist-in-residence at the Dusable Museum, and has expanded his creative practice beyond textiles and is experimenting in painting, drawing, and ceramics. His work has since been exhibited in major art institutions and museums including the Art Institute of Chicago, Salon 94 Design Gallery in New York, The Hyde Park Art Center, and Kavi Gupta Gallery in Chicago.

== Awards and exhibition history ==
=== Exhibition history ===
- United Colors of Earl Paige sponsored by the Terra Museum and Art Design Chicago, at the Hyde Park Art Center, April 6 – October 27, 2024
- Lemme Know When You Make It, Group Exhibition, Hyde Park Art Center, June 20, 2022 – September 30, 2022
- Power to the People, Solo Exhibition curated by Duro Oluwu, Salon 94 Design, New York City, New York, September 2022 – November 2022
- AfriCOBRA 50, Group Show, Kavi Gupta, Chicago, IL, September 29, 2018 – November 3, 2018
- Solo Exhibition, The Parish Gallery, Georgetown, Washington DC, 2009
- Solo Exhibition, Cin4ue Gallery, New York City, New York, 1995
- "Black Print Matters", Group Show, South Side Community Center, Chicago, IL, 1992
- Fabrications & Design "The Art of the Muppets", Chicago Museum of Science and Industry, Chicago, IL, 1980
- Solo Exhibition, Oakland Art Museum, Oakland, California, 1976
- Solo Exhibition, St. Louis Art Museum, St. Louis, Missouri 1976
- Frederick Douglas Museum of African American Art, Washington DC, 1976
- "The Black Solidarity", Pittsburgh Civic Arena, Pittsburgh, Pennsylvania, 1976
- Group Exhibition, Howard University, Washington, DC, 1975
- Group Exhibition, Illinois Institute of Technology, Chicago, Illinois, 1964
- Group Exhibition, Art Institute of Chicago, Chicago, Illinois, 1955
- Group Exhibition, Young American US Museum of Contemporary Crafts, New York City, New York, 1952

=== Grants and awards ===
- Chicago Council on Fine Arts Grant, 1984
- National Endowment for the Arts Exhibitions Grant, 1975-1976
