= Adrienne Outlaw =

American sculptor and artist

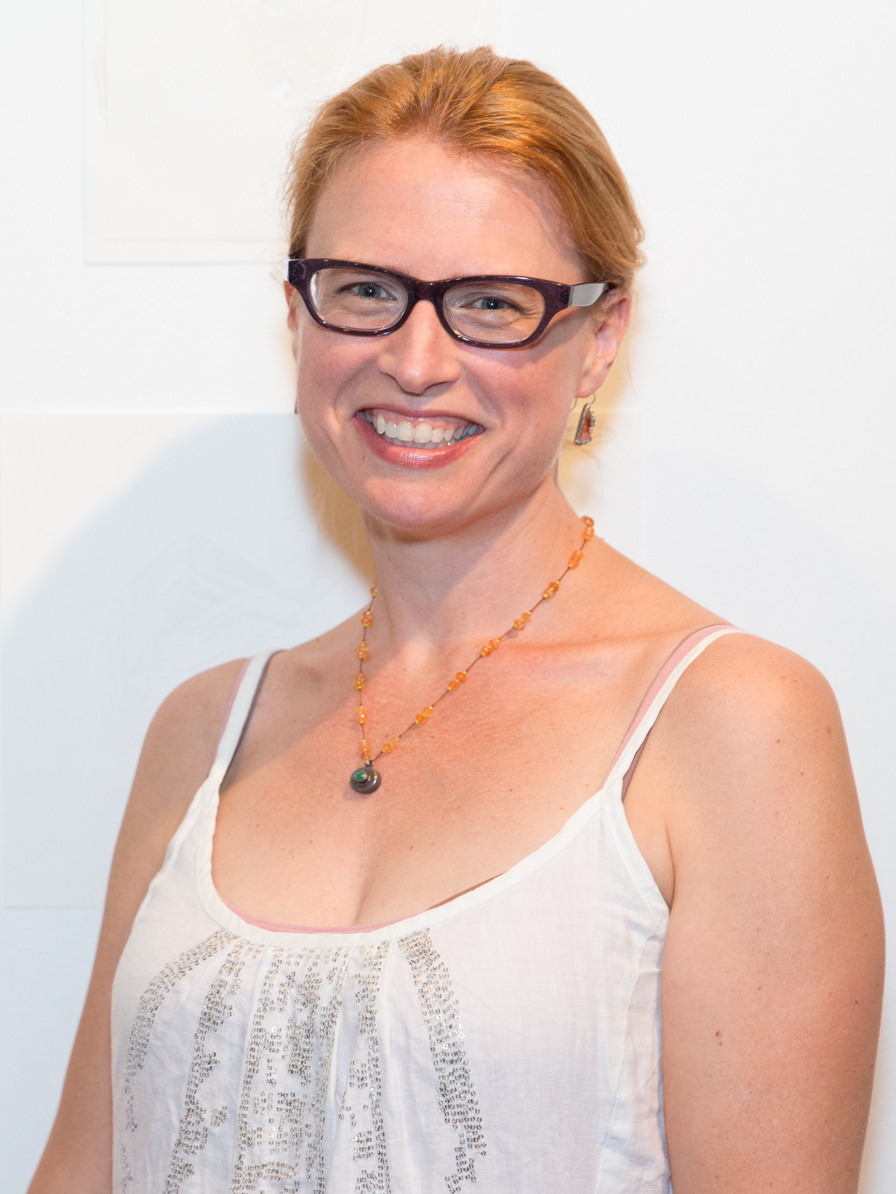
- Outlaw in 2014
- Born: 1970 (age 55–56)
- Education: School of the Art Institute of Chicago; Vanderbilt University
- Known for: Sculpture
- Style: bioethical biotechnology

Adrienne Outlaw (born 1970) is an American sculptor and interdisciplinary artist. Her work draws inspiration from bioethical issues and biotechnology. Based in Tennessee, she is represented by whitespace gallery, in Atlanta, Georgia.

Her work is included in the permanent collections of the US Embassy in Abuja, Nigeria, Cheekwood Museum of Art, and the Tennessee State Museum. Outlaw's work has been featured in Art in America, Art Papers, World Sculpture, Sculpture, USArt, FiberArts, and Number: An Independent Arts Journal. Outlaw is a graduate of the School of the Art Institute of Chicago,(BFA, 1993) and Vanderbilt University, (MLAS, 2004).
