= Mark Nelson (artist, born 1957) =

Mark Nelson (born 1957) is an artist whose work is exhibited internationally. Nelson's style has been described as "socially critical, prolific, and satirically expressive."

== Biography ==
Nelson was born in Oakland Naval Hospital, one of three sons born to a Navy family, who as a result spent much time overseas during Nelson's childhood, including periods in Yokohama, Japan and Kahaluu, Oahu Island, Hawaii. At the age of 13, Nelson moved to the Panama Canal Zone. He began his art studies at the Panama Canal Zone College, then studied graphic design at la Universidad Nacional de Panama', studio arts at the Escuela Nacional de Artes Plasticas-Casco Viejo, and was mentored in theatrical design at the Ancon Theatre Guild, with productions directed by Bill Gonzalez. In 1984 he moved to the United States to study at the School of the Art Institute of Chicago, where he completed his Bachelor of Fine Arts in 1986. He remained in Chicago to complete his master's degree from the University of Illinois at Chicago, where his studies culminated with a decade of interdisciplinary art installations.

Inspired by his friend and fellow artist Francisco Mendoza to become a teaching artist, Nelson taught in the Chicago public school system as a resident artist and permanent instructor for 29 years, beginning with college work-study programs, 18 years teaching at Stone Academy, and five years at Schurz High School, retiring in June 2017. Additionally, Nelson has taught at Northeastern Illinois University, St. Augustine College, and Columbia College Chicago, and is currently adjunct faculty at Triton College, River Grove, Illinois.

In 1998, Nelson acquired his GringoLandia Studio, and took up permanent residence within Pilsen Historic District. Nelson has been involved with the Pilsen artist community since the mid-1980s, and is one of the original artists who collaborated to create the 18th Street Pilsen Open Studios. Nelson's public works include the F22 DairyAir Enforcer from the 1999 "Cows on Parade" public art project, and a 2007 canvas mural entitled "Jesus Lizard on the Banana Channel" purchased by the U.S. State Department and installed in the new U.S. Consulate in the Republic of Panama.

Nelson has also produced a number of short documentary films, principally for national parks in Arizona and South Dakota, where he works as a National Park Service Ranger during summers. His films on local topics, especially the Chicago Hispanic community, have been shown on Chicago Access Network Television.

As well as various other grants and professional recognition, Nelson was awarded the 2014 Photography Program Award by the Chicago Photographic Society, the 2013 Oppy Award by the Oppenheimer Family Foundation, the 2008 Teacher of Distinction award by the Golden Apple Foundation, and the 2003 First Place Award by the Barrington Area Arts Council, as well as receiving the Illinois Arts Council Fellowship on two occasions.

Nelson lives in Pilsen with his wife Anna Kong, also a retired teacher.
