= Mika Tosca =

Climate scientist (born 1985/1986)

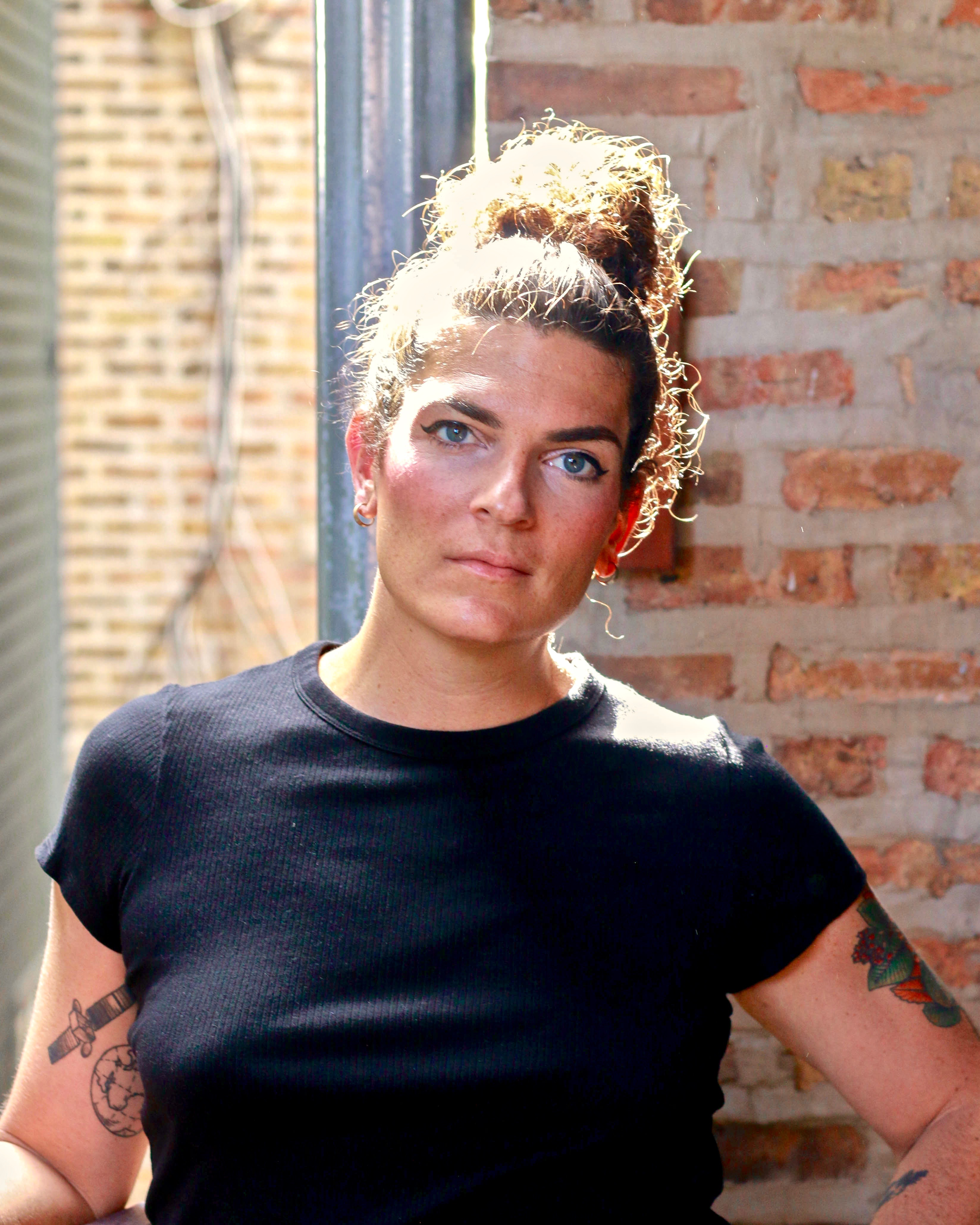
- Born: 1985 or 1986 (age 40–41)
- Occupation: Climate scientist

Academic background
- Education: University of Connecticut (BS); University of California, Irvine (MS, PhD)
- Academic advisors: James Randerson (UCI), Charles Zender (UCI), David Diner (JPL)

Academic work
- Discipline: Earth System Science, Climate Science
- Institutions: School of the Art Institute of Chicago; NASA Jet Propulsion Laboratory

Mika Tosca (born 1985 or 1986) is a climate scientist. Her research concerns ways in which art and design can impact communication about climate science to more effectively address climate change. Tosca also contributes to science communication, including through science-art initiatives, and she is an advocate for Trans people in STEM, academia, and the media.

== Education ==
In 2006, Tosca earned a BS in Mathematics-Statistics from the University of Connecticut. In 2008, she received the NASA Earth and Space Graduate Fellowship (NESSF). While completing the fellowship, Tosca earned an MS in Earth System Science from the University of California, Irvine (UCI). She then completed a PhD in Earth System Science at UCI with Charlie Zender and James Randerson in 2012. The fellowship funded the research that Tosca pursued during her MS and PhD programs. NASA also funded Tosca's postdoctoral research.

== Career and research ==
During her PhD program, Tosca researched how the climate system is interconnected with landscape wildfires, and studied aerosol emissions using Earth system models. As a postdoctoral scholar, she continued this work at the Jet Propulsion Laboratory a NASA-affiliated research lab, working with David Diner. At NASA, she researched how climate, the clouds, and wildfires interact, using satellite sensors. Her research with NASA took her to Namibia, South Africa, in 2016, where she observed the relationship between wildfire smoke and cloud formation as part of the NASA ORACLES field campaign.

In 2017, Tosca joined the faculty at the School of the Art Institute of Chicago (SAIC) as an assistant professor. A 2019 PBS profile of Tosca describes how after six years at the NASA Jet Propulsion Laboratory, she left for the teaching position at SAIC, after becoming "convinced that artists could help scientists better communicate to the public the seriousness of the climate change threat the world is facing." A 2019 Medill Reports report on Tosca describes her concern that scientists are often not creating knowledge for the general public, and her belief that artists and scientists can work together to improve science communication. At SAIC, she researched the connection between art and science, working with artists and designers to investigate the effectiveness of science communication and contemporary climate science questions.

In October 2023, after the Gaza war began, Tosca posted what was described by the Jewish Telegraphic Agency as "harsh anti-Israel sentiments" on Instagram. On the next day, Tosca apologized for the comments, and SAIC president Elissa Tenny wrote that the school "rejects such hateful views." As of January 2024, Tosca was no longer employed by SAIC.

As of 2026, Tosca works at the Woodwell Climate Research Center as a research associate.

== Science communication and outreach ==
Tosca advocates for increased public awareness of climate change. In 2017, she spoke with Inman News about the impact of climate change on the real estate industry and what individuals can do to help. In 2019, she spoke with AGU TV (American Geophysical Union) about the environmental effects of wildfire emissions.

In addition, she advocates for how the intersection between contemporary queer, feminist, and environmental issues is related to advocacy about the climate crisis. A profile of Tosca in the University of Bristol's independent student newspaper Epigram describes Tosca identifying an "interesting parallel" when she writes, 'Fifty years ago ... queer folks began a revolution that demanded we be respected as equals – both in life and in law – and that revolution has resulted in enormous progress for LGBT+ people everywhere' and when Tosca then advocates that there is now 'another opportunity for us to be truly revolutionary.' The Windy City Times quoted Tosca discussing "important parallels between the existential crisis facing the planet and the existential crisis that confronts many transgender folks as we begin to reckon with and acknowledge our own gender."

In 2021, Tosca was listed as one of the Grist 50, for her work to promote collaboration between scientists and artists.

== Advocacy for trans people ==
When the issue arose in the science community as to how science journals would respond to researchers who had transitioned their gender and changed their name, Cell's editor in chief John Pham contacted Tosca for her opinion, even though she has not been impacted by the issue due to pre-transition publications only using her initials, which match her current initials; Tosca told The Scientist, "The biggest thing that [journals can] do with respect to trans people is to allow them to change their names without a cumbersome process."

Tosca has appeared in the media as an advocate for trans issues. In 2018, after more than 1,600 scientists signed an open letter opposing Trump administration plans for a legal definition of gender, Tosca spoke with BuzzFeed News, stating, "As a trans woman and as a scientist, it’s inherently an attack on my humanity, my ability to exist in the world, and to safely navigate certain spaces," and "It was really important that we gather as many scientists as we could to say that so scientists ourselves were not complicit in promoting this wholly flawed nonscientific effort." In 2019, she spoke with The Chicago Tribune about a United States Supreme Court decision narrowly upholding a Trump administration policy on transgender people in the military, and stated that "it’s important that trans folks be able to participate as full citizens."

== Selected works ==
In 2017, Tosca's work with the Multi-angle Imaging SpectroRadiometer (MISR) was featured by the NASA Jet Propulsion Laboratory.

== Personal life ==
Tosca told the Chicago Reader in 2018 that the movie Ferngully influenced her decision to become a climate/environmental scientist, stating, "The protagonist is a female fairy and even though I was assigned male at birth, I always imagined myself as her—fighting corporations and being a badass chick."
