= LeRoy Winbush =

American graphic designer (1915–2007)

LeRoy Winbush (1915–2007) was an American graphic designer known for his window displays.

== Career ==
Winbush was born in Memphis, Tennessee, his parents LeRoy (Lee) Winbush Sr. and Alberta Meabane however he spent his childhood in Detroit. When Winbush was about fourteen his mother moved the family to Chicago, on the Southside, where Winbush graduated from Englewood High School.

Winbush began his career in Chicago in 1936. Initially starting out as an apprentice to a sign painter, before moving to designing signs, then on to murals and flyers for the Regal Theater. Through this experience he then became an art director for Goldblatt's department store chain, where he was the first Black employee. Although initially starting out in the department store's sign shop— eventually worked his way up to become the Art Director overseeing a staff of about 60 people.

In 1945 Winbush founded his own firm, Winbush Associates. Winbush was known as a successful businessman and entrepreneur. One of Winbush's successes was to develop a market designing window displays for Chicago's banks.

He served as an art director for Consolidated Manufacturing as well as Johnson Publishing, where he art directed and designed layouts for the Negro Digest, Hue, Cooper, EBONY, Tan Confessions, and JET magazines. Besides designing magazine layouts, he also designed Jet Magazines handbrush stylized logo. Other publications project included DUKE magazine, published in 1957 it was short-lived, (publishing only six issues, however, it was the first Black male pinup magazine. Dan Burley well known Black journalist was the founder and editor. His designs for EBONY won an award from the Chicago Art Directors Club. He was president of the South Side Community Art Center.

Winbush taught communication design at the School of the Art Institute of Chicago and Columbia College Chicago. Beginning in 1992, Winbush consulted for the DuSable Museum.

Winbush was the first black member of the Art Directors Club of Chicago. It took him seven years of petitioning the club to join; later he served as the club's president. He was chairman of the International Design Conference in Aspen in 1959. Winbush worked on Illinois's exhibit at the 1964 World's Fair. In 1985, having become an avid scuba diver, Winbush helped design an underwater reef at Epcot.
