= Kenneth Josephson =

American photographer (born 1932)

Kenneth Josephson (born July 1, 1932) is an American photographer.

== Biography ==
Kenneth Josephson was born on July 1, 1932, in Detroit, Michigan. He completed his elementary education in Detroit. In 1953 after being sent in Germany by the United States Army he was trained in photolithography and aerial reconnaissance photography. In 1957 he earned a Bachelor of Fine Arts from the Rochester Institute of Technology, located in New York. There he studied under Minor White.

In 1960 he earned a master's degree from the Institute of Design of the Illinois Institute of Technology. While studying there he was influenced by Aaron Siskind and Harry Callahan.

== Career ==
After earning his master's degree in 1960 Kenneth Josephson worked at the School of the Art Institute of Chicago from 1960 to 1997, when he retired. In 1963 he co-founded with thirty other notable photographers the Society for Photographic Education. His works in the 1960s and 1970s which were focused on conceptual photography placed him at the forefront of conceptual photography. In 1972 he was awarded with the Guggenheim Fellowship grant by the John Simon Guggenheim Memorial Foundation. In 1975 and in 1979 he was awarded the NEA grant by the National Endowment for the Arts agency.

Many of his collections are found in museums such as the Metropolitan Museum of Art of New York City, the Museum of Contemporary Art, Chicago, the Smithsonian Institution in Washington, the National Museum of American Art and the Bibliothèque nationale in Paris. In 1977 and 1983 many of his works became part of exhibitions in Austria, the United Kingdom, Germany, the Netherlands, Sweden, Switzerland and France.

== Notable photographs ==
- Matthew, 1965
- Polapan, 1973
- New York State, 1970
- Stockholm, 1968
