= Rebecca Ringquist =

- Born: Michigan
- Education: Master of Fine Arts, The Art Institute of Chicago, Bachelor of Arts, Cornell College

Rebecca Ringquist is a Portland, Oregon-based visual artist. Ringquist creates embroidered artwork and runs her own design company, Dropcloth Samplers. Her work extends the traditional processes of Fiber art by dealing with vintage fabrics, utilizing the sewing machine, and applying hand-embroidery techniques. Ringquist was a professor for seven years in the Department of Fiber and Material Studies at The School of the Art Institute of Chicago. She is also the author of Rebecca Ringquist's Embroidery Workshops: A Bend the Rules Primer.

== Life and work ==
Rebecca Ringquist was born in Michigan. Ringquist received a Bachelors of Special Studies Honors in Art and graduated cum laude from Cornell College in 2000. While pursuing her undergraduate degree she became interested in feminist theory and embroidery. In 2003 she earned her M.F.A. from the Art Institute of Chicago in fiber and material studies. At the Art Institute of Chicago Ringquist developed an understanding of fiber arts within a historical context; she is very interested in how material could convey its own history and meaning. This led to Ringquist utilizing her embroidery for political and conceptual works as well as re-creating stories about her life and relationships. The imagery in her work comes from a multitude of books, dictionaries, nature guides, autograph books, valentines, and fairy tales. Her techniques involve layers of color and texture while making use of vintage textiles that have previously been embroidered. In addition, she finds new uses for classic stitches such as the running stitch or French knot.

The embroidered pieces Ringquist creates amalgamate multi-layered fabrics, overlapping narratives and technicolor stitches that characterize Ringquist's repertoire of work. She incorporates both standard and unconventional techniques by working with a sewing machine as well as by hand. She views embroidery used in this manner as similar to painting; her stitches overlap creating many layers and textures. The work makes use of decorative cloths, vintage fabrics and old hand-stitched cloths made by other embroiderers. In re-using such materials, she removes them from their original context and thus alters their meanings. The re-constituted cloths help create the sense of fairy tale or myth. The stories as told by her stitches insinuate many narratives, but never reveal the entire story.

Outside of her own atypical practice, she is known for encouraging her students and workshop attendees to break the rules. She is more concerned about the students getting started than having the perfect technique. Ringquist sees knots in the thread as additional way to add texture to the fabric. Her workshops teach a variety of techniques such as how to transfer a design to a canvas, create three-dimensional stitches, use non-traditional threads and fabrics, intermix both machine- and hand-stitching, and draw with thread itself.

In April 2015, Ringquist had her first book published. The book, entitled, Rebecca Ringquist's Embroidery Workshops is a resource for a generation of embroiderers interested in a variety of both time-tested and unique new techniques. The book is based on the classes Ringquist leads throughout the county. It features instructions for a multitude of projects as well as a cloth sampler that was designed specifically for the book. She also sells samples and pre-printed patterns on Etsy as well as through her design company, Dropcloth.

== Sources ==
- Forker, Jennifer (2015-02-24). "Hoop-la: Embroidery's back, with some modern twists". The Brooklyn Daily Eagle. Retrieved 2016-04-25.
- Glassenberg, Abby (2015-04-06). Episode 46: Rebecca Ringquist. While She Naps. Retrieved 2016-04-24.
- "Q&A with Rebecca Ringquist, a Narrative Fiber Artist". ArtStyle Blog. Retrieved 2016-04-25.
