= Darryl DeAngelo Terrell =

American artist (born 1991)

- Born: 1991 (age 34–35); Detroit, Michigan, U.S.
- Education: Wayne State University, School of the Art Institute of Chicago
- Occupations: Photographer, videographer, performance artist, curator
- Website: www.darryldterrell.com

Darryl DeAngelo Terrell (born Detroit, 1991) is an African-American artist based in Brooklyn, who is a lens-based media artist, activist, curator, DJ, educator, performer and writer, known for their photography and videography. They identify as queer, femme, and non-binary, which has informed their art work. Terrell's work explores issues of history, displacement, femme identity, sexuality, and gender, amongst other issues.

== Early life and education ==
Terrell was born in 1991 in Detroit, Michigan, where they were also raised. They attended Wayne State University, where they graduated with a BFA degree in 2015. This degree was followed by study at School of the Art Institute of Chicago, where Terrell received a MFA. degree in photography in 2018.

While attended graduate school, they began experimenting with performance art, and explored gender expression; and for this they created an alter-ego, "Dion". The performance work by Dion was foundation to his photograph, I Look Like My Momma (Self-portrait 1980). Their 2017 work, #Project20s, was photographs of 200 black or brown people in their 20s before Terrell turned age 30.

Terrell has been awarded the Kresge Arts Fellowship (2019), Document Detroit Fellowship (2019), and the Luminarts Fellowship in Visual Arts (2018). Terrell's work is included in the permanent art collection at the Art Institute of Chicago.

== Influences ==
Terrell is influenced by African-American folklore and music; with books such as ‘Mules and Men’ by Zora Neale Hurston and ‘Songs of Solomon’ by Toni Morrison and music styles including jazz, spiritual jazz, house, soul and hip-hop. They are also heavily influenced by their community that they describe as “bold, radical, queer, fighting black people”.

== Residencies ==
Since leaving university, they have become a 2023 Baxter St Resident, 2022 Fire Island Artist in Resident, 2022 Lighthouse Work Fellow, 2021 Black Rock Senegal Artist in Resident, 2021 The Black Embodiment Studio Arts writing Resident, 2020/21 Red Bull House of Art Resident, 2019/20 Document Detroit Fellow, 2019 Kresge Arts in Detroit Fellow in Visual Arts and a 2018 Luminarts Fellow in Visual Arts.

== Projects ==
=== A Way to Get Gone ===
Their project A Way to Get Gone (2020-2022), which was exhibited at NXTHVN’s Gallery along with artist Hong Hong in the ‘Let Them Roam Freely’ exhibition.

Each piece in this project is a photograph of what Terrell describes as ‘Portals’. These ‘portals’ are created through Terrell dressed in gold and dancing in front of the lens to capture only slight form and movement, to ‘trick’ the viewers into seeing a gold, shimmering shape. Gold is used not only as it represents power but also “like a guide, a way home”. They are portals to freedom for black people.

Each photograph is titled with a set of coordinates to the place was taken. A lot of these places are places of historical and current violence of white supremacy, and these portals are placed as escape routes. Terrell describes using these locations as “a way to honour this land and the ancestors that once walk it.” The images are shown alongside an audio collage, which has a monologue from Sun Ra’s 1972 film ‘Space is the Place’.

=== #Project20s ===
In #Project20s (2017), they got photographs of over 200 black or Latinx people between the ages of 20 and 30. Each photograph is processed as a cyanotype stained with black tea or coffee partly for the aesthetics to fit with the skin tones but also inspired by Louis Agassiz's Slave Daguerreotypes. As with their other work, they were heavily influenced by their upbringing in Detroit and hip-hop music, with two songs having particular influence on this project: We Don’t Care by Kanye West and Chapter Six by Kendrick Lamar. For these portraits, they reached out to communities, groups and collectives, with the plan of showcasing these photographs projected on walls in communities affected by gentrification “as a reminder of black and brown people being removed from their neighbourhoods and communities for capital gain”.

=== Dion ===
Dion is Terrell’s femme alter ego, who they use to explore what it means to be desired and included. In this series of self-portrait photography, video, performance, text and sound, they incorporate influences from the black urban aesthetic to show off their blackness, queerness and femininity.

“Terrell as Dion addresses the gaze of the camera head-on, at home in their power and poise as a beautiful person worthy of admiration and love.”

== Exhibitions ==
=== Exhibitions curated by Terrell ===
- In This House
- Box of 24 - 2019
- Oh, Maker - 2018
- + - 2017
- MOCA.IG (Museum of Contemporary Art of Instagram) - 2017

=== Exhibitions Terrell has been a part of ===
- Body as Image; Chicago Artists Coalition Gallery; Apr 27 2018 - May 17 2018
- Gonzalo Reyes Rodriguez & Darryl DeAngelo Terrell; Roots and Culture; Sep 7 2018 - Oct 6 2018
- Cubed Luminous; Pensacola Museum of Art; Nov 8 2018 - Nov 11 2018
- This is What We Know; Chicago Artists Coalition Gallery; Nov 30 2018 - Dec 20 2018
- Online: Elliot Jerome Brown Jr., Nonzuzo Gxekwa & Darryl DeAngelo Terrell: Quiver of Voices; Ltd Los Angeles; Apr 15 2020 - Jun 15 2020
- We Wear the Mask; Higher Pictures Generation; Dec 21 2020 - Apr 6 2020
- Hong Hong and Darryl DeAngelo Terrell: Let Them Roam Freely; NXTHVN; May 5 2022 - May 15 2022
- Salon Highlight: Darryl DeAngelo Terrell; Louis Buhl & Co; May 14 2022 - Jun 22 2022
- Femme is Fierce: Femme Queer Gender Performance in Photography; Hood Museum of Art; Oct 12022 - Dec 17 2022
- Darryl DeAngelo Terrell: Take Root in The Air; Ortega Y Gasset Projects; Mar 4 2023 - Apr 2 2023
- Darryl DeAngelo Terrell: It's Never To Late to Admit That You Love Me; Baxter Street at CCNY; Sep 13 2023 - Oct 18 2023

== Articles ==
- Darryl DeAngelo Terrell Asks to be Loved as Both Soft and Strong | Editorial | Testudo
- Roaming Into Another Realm: Hong Hong And Darryl DeAngelo Terrell’s Portals
- Darryl DeAngelo Terrell is unapologetically queer in first solo show | Detroit | Detroit Metro Times
- It’s Never Too Late to Admit That You Love Me | Baxter St at CCNY
- I Wish I Was Perfectly Happy @ Wa Na Wari - The Ticket
- Imaging the Body In Analog: A Review of “Body As Image” at the Chicago Artists Coalition | Newcity Art
- Kresge Arts in Detroit Names Fellows in Art and Literature – ARTnews.com
- Aesthetica Magazine - Portals to the Future
- The Art Institute of Chicago presents: Floating Museum: A Lion for Every House
- Artists Named for Kehinde Wiley’s Second Black Rock Residency – ARTnews.com
- The Artful Life: 6 Things Galerie Editors Love This Week - Galerie
- Detroit photographer uses gender-bending self-portraits to explore black and queer identity
- Foundwork | Guest Curators | Darryl DeAngelo Terrell
- Making Way to Visibility and Inclusion: In Conversation with Darryl DeAngelo Terrell – Detroit Cultural
- Artists get 'life-changing' $25K grants through Kresge Arts in Detroit
- Photographic Visual Artist Darryl DeAngelo Terrell Announces First Solo Exhibition at Galerie Camille | BLAC Detroit
- Darryl DeAngelo Terrell and Matthew Leifheit | Baxter St at CCNY
- Darryl DeAngelo Terrell – Mighty Real/Queer Detroit
- Darryl DeAngelo Terrell - LVL3
- BECOMING DION - Museum of Contemporary African Diasporan Art
- Why this Detroit photographer is taking 200 pictures of young people of color | Detroit | Detroit Metro Times
- Body as Image - Chicago Artists Coalition
