= Barbara Tetenbaum =

Contemporary American artist

- Born: 1957 (age 68–69)
- Education: B.A., University of Wisconsin-Madison; M.F.A., Art Institute of Chicago
- Known for: Artist books
- Style: Contemporary
- Awards: 2003-04 Fulbright Lecturer, Czech Republic; 2005 Oregon Arts Fellowship; 2005 Regional Arts and Culture Council Project Grant; 2011 Sally Bishop Fellowship, Center for Book Art, New York

Barbara Tetenbaum (born 1957), is an American contemporary artist who produces limited edition artist books.

== Early life and education ==
Born in 1957, Tetenbaum is the daughter of Marvin and Zelda (Dorin) Tetenbaum. She earned her MFA in printmaking at the School of the Art Institute of Chicago and a BFA from the University of Wisconsin-Madison.

== Career ==
Tetenbaum was on the faculty and served as Department Head of Book Arts at the Oregon College of Arts and Craft (OCAC) in Portland, Oregon. She operates Triangular Press.

Tetenbaum's work is held in a number of artists' books collections in institutions, including the Smithsonian, Harvard University Fine Arts Library, the University of Oregon, and University of Michigan.

== Critical reception ==
Marcia Reed, who chairs the Exhibition Awards committee of the Association of College and Research Libraries Rare Books and Manuscripts Section, said:

Addressing the world of books and readers energetically and with humor, Tetenbaum transcends her own production and concludes with a stirring contemporary manifesto: "To create books out of passion, to give selfwill a form and thus to stimulate the reader's and observer's every sense, this is where we share common ground."

— Marcia Reed

Karla Starr wrote in Willamette Week, "Her masterful, varied interpretations of the book have been featured in exhibitions worldwide... Her unusual, enchanting graphic juxtapositions range from surreal to nostalgic, demonstrating command and interest in exploiting all elements involved in book design."

== Selected publications ==
- Tetenbaum, Barbara. Emptiness is not Nothing. Die Leere ist Nicht Nichts. Leipzig: Triangular Press. 2009.
- Tetenbaum, Barbara and Julie Chen. Glimpse. Berkeley, CA: Flying Fish Press; Portland, OR: Triangular Press, 2011.
- Tetenbaum, Barbara. Mining My Ántonia. Portland and West Hartford: Triangular Press and the Hartford Art School Print Workshop. 2012.
- Tetenbaum, Barbara. Artist's Book Ideation Cards. Berkeley, CA: Flying Fish Press; Portland, OR: Triangular Press, 2013.
- Tetenbaum, Barbara. A Powerfully Exciting Short Story. Portland: Triangular Press. 2008.
- Satie, Erik. Ode to a Grand Staircase (For Four Hands). Julie Chen, Barbara Tetenbaum, artists. Berkeley, CA: Flying Fish Press; Portland, OR: Triangular Press, 2001.

== Awards ==
- 2003-04 Fulbright Lecture award to teach in the Czech Republic.
- 2005 Oregon Arts Fellowship.
- 2005 Regional Arts and Culture Council Project Grant.
- 2010 or 2011 Sally Bishop Fellowship at the Center for Book Arts in New York.
