= Francis Chapin =

American painter (1899–1965)

- Born: February 14, 1899; Bristolville, Ohio
- Died: February 23, 1965 (aged 66); Chicago, Illinois
- Known for: oil, watercolor

Francis W. Chapin (February 14, 1899 – February 23, 1965) was an American artist. His works included both watercolors and oil paintings of landscapes and portraits.

== Biography ==
He was born in Bristolville, Ohio. He graduated from Washington and Jefferson College, where he was a member of Phi Delta Theta, in 1921. A year later he enrolled at the Art Institute of Chicago where he spent six years and won the Bryan Lathrop Fellowship in his last year. He chose to remain in Chicago where he became known as the “Dean of Chicago Painters.” It wasn't until 1929 when he hosted his first pair of one-man shows.

Chapin was an instructor at the Art Institute of Chicago from 1929 to 1947. In 1932, Chapin was approached by Grant Wood and accepted a faculty position at the Stone City Art Colony, where he taught lithography for two summers. His work was also part of the painting event in the art competition at the 1932 Summer Olympics. From 1934 to 1938, he taught at Art Institute of Chicago's summer art school at Saugatuck, Michigan, and he served as director of the summer school from 1941 to 1945. He was also the Artist-in-Residence at the Old Sculpin Gallery on Martha's Vineyard for many years. In 1951, he was elected into the National Academy of Design as an Associate member, and became a full member in 1953. Also from 1951 to 1953, he served as visiting artist at the University of Georgia.

Among Chapin’s notable showings were at the Art Institute of Chicago, the Pennsylvania Academy of the Fine Arts and the Corcoran Gallery in Washington, D.C. His works are in permanent collections at the Art Institute of Chicago, Brooklyn Museum (NYC), Philadelphia Museum of Art, Metropolitan Museum of Art (NYC), Pennsylvania Academy of the Fine Arts, Syracuse University, and other museums.

Chapin died in his home at 347 Menomonee Street in Chicago on February 23, 1965. In reporting his death, one newspaper described Chapin's appearance as follows: "he was a colorful figure, nearly 6 feet 6 inches tall, and thin, and usually wearing tweeds."

Chapin's papers are held in the Archives of American Art, Smithsonian Institution.
