= Illinois Arts Council =

American government agency

The Illinois Arts Council is a government agency of the state of Illinois formed to encourage development of the arts throughout Illinois. Founded in 1965 by the Illinois General Assembly, the Illinois Arts Council provides financial and technical assistance to artists, arts organizations, and community organizations with arts programming.

== The Illinois Arts Council ==
The Illinois Arts Council is governed by up to 21 members appointed by the Governor of Illinois who serve four-year terms. They meet three times a year. Assisted by volunteer advisory panels, they distribute grants and oversee arts programs and services.

Many arts organizations in Illinois rely on funding from the Illinois Arts Council each year. Governor Rod Blagojevich drastically cut the budget in 2007 in what many saw as a political move against his chief rival, Michael Madigan, whose wife was the head of the council.

Governor Pritzker's Y25 budget for the Illinois Arts Council brings a 65% increase from previous budgets setting it back to previous amounts. ($15.5M to $25.58M).

Since 2022, Nora Daley, of Chicago's renowned Daley family, has served as chair of The Illinois Arts Council.

== Programs ==
- Artist Fellowship Program
- Arts & Foreign Language
- Arts Service Organizations
- Artstour & Live Music
- Community Arts Access
- General Operating Support
- Individual Artist Support
- Master/Apprentice Program
- Partners in Excellence
- StARTS Program
- Summer Youth Employment in the Arts

== Services ==
- Application Workshops
- Artists' Registry, a mailing list to link Illinois artists with professional opportunities
- Artslinks, sites through Illinois with coordinators and Illinois Arts Council publications
- Awareness Meetings
- Directory of Illinois Performing Arts Presenters
- Directory of Local Arts Agencies
- Illinois Art Fair Directory, an annual publication
- Technical Assistance

== Illinois Arts Council members ==
- Nora Daley, Chairman
- Rhoda A. Pierce, Vice-chairman
- Joshua Davis-Ruperto, Executive Director
- Les Begay, Member
- Joan Clifford Member
- Michael R. Conn, Member
- Richard Daniels, Member
- Gillian Flynn, Member
- Henry Godinez, Member
- Sarah Herda, Member
- Vicki Heyman, Member
- Anne Kaplan, Member
- Jodie Kavensky, Member
- Valerie King, Member
- Shirley R. Madigan, Member
- Robert Maguire, Member
- Peggy Montes, Member
- Pemon Rami, Member
- Hedy Ratner, Member
- Marsha Ryan, Member
- Christina Steelman, Member
