= Visual arts of Chicago =

Visual arts of Chicago refers to paintings, prints, illustrations, textile art, sculpture, ceramics and other visual artworks produced in Chicago or by people with a connection to Chicago. Since World War II, Chicago visual art has had a strong individualistic streak, little influenced by outside fashions. "One of the unique characteristics of Chicago," said Pennsylvania Academy of Fine Arts curator Bob Cozzolino, "is there's always been a very pronounced effort to not be derivative, to not follow the status quo." The Chicago art world has been described as having "a stubborn sense ... of tolerant pluralism." However, Chicago's art scene is "critically neglected." Critic Andrew Patner has said, "Chicago's commitment to figurative painting, dating back to the post-War period, has often put it at odds with New York critics and dealers." It is argued that Chicago art is rarely found in Chicago museums; some of the most remarkable Chicago artworks are found in other cities (such as the brilliantly warped epic drawings of Henry Darger at the American Folk Art Museum in New York City, or Carlos Cortez' collection of early 20th-century Chicago "Wobbly" (Industrial Workers of the World) woodcut prints, now in the Walter P. Reuther Library at Wayne State University in Detroit).

== Early days: before the War ==
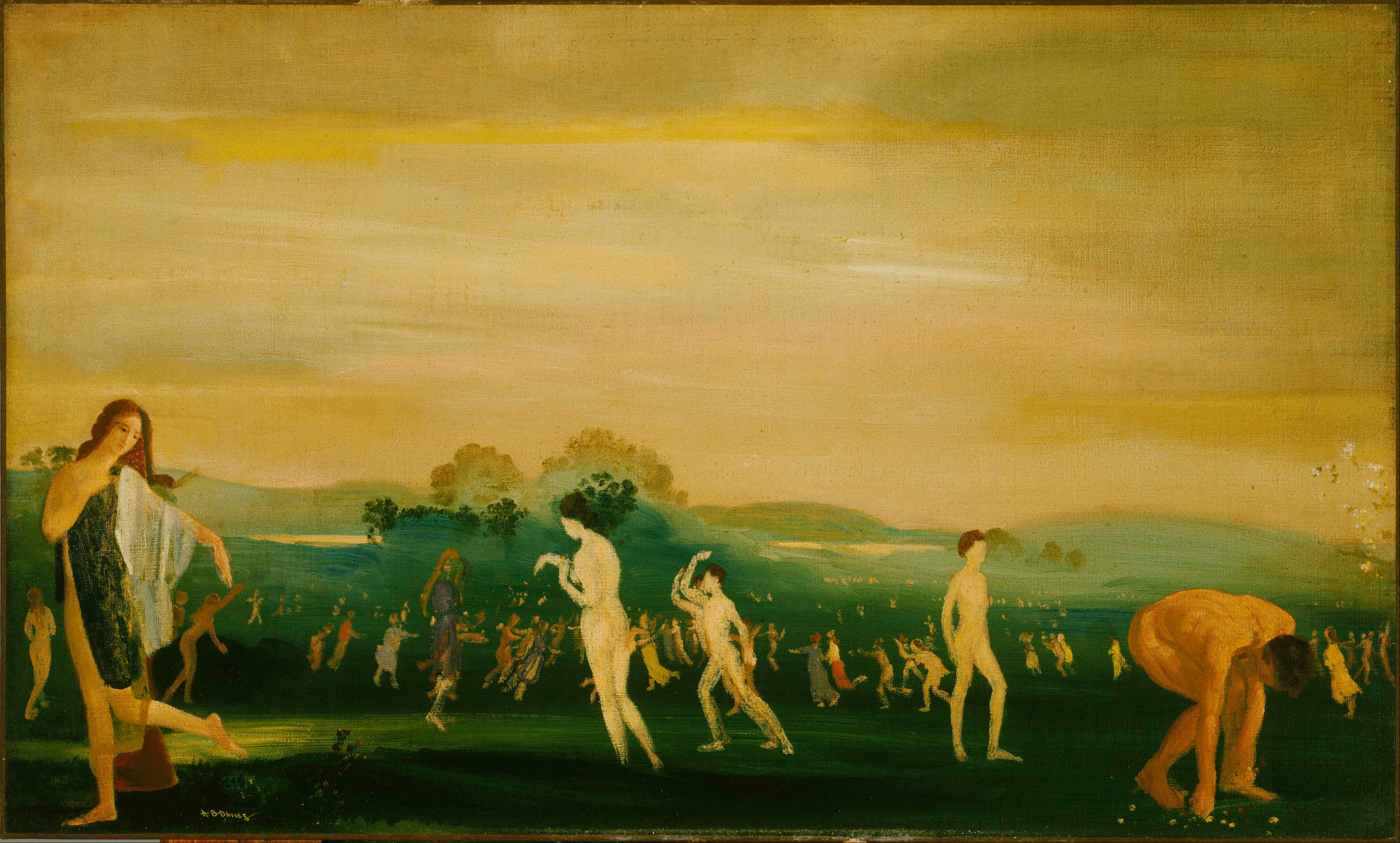
Arthur B. Davies, Elysian Fields, undated, oil on canvas, The Phillips Collection (Washington, D. C.)

The School of the Art Institute of Chicago was founded in 1879, from the remains of the Chicago Academy of Design, an earlier school founded in 1866 (thus the school predates the museum of the same name). Early students and faculty were conservative and derivative in their tastes, imitating popular European models. Arthur B. Davies, a former SAIC student and one of "the Eight" was considered a disappointment for being a member of a radical group of urban modernists. In 1913, SAIC students held a protest with costumes and bonfires against the Chicago showing of the Armory Show, a collection of the best new modern art; the newspapers described the students' activity as a riot.

Only a year later the African-American realist Archibald J. Motley, graduated from the School of the Art Institute of Chicago; he kept his modern, jazz-influenced paintings secret for some years after.

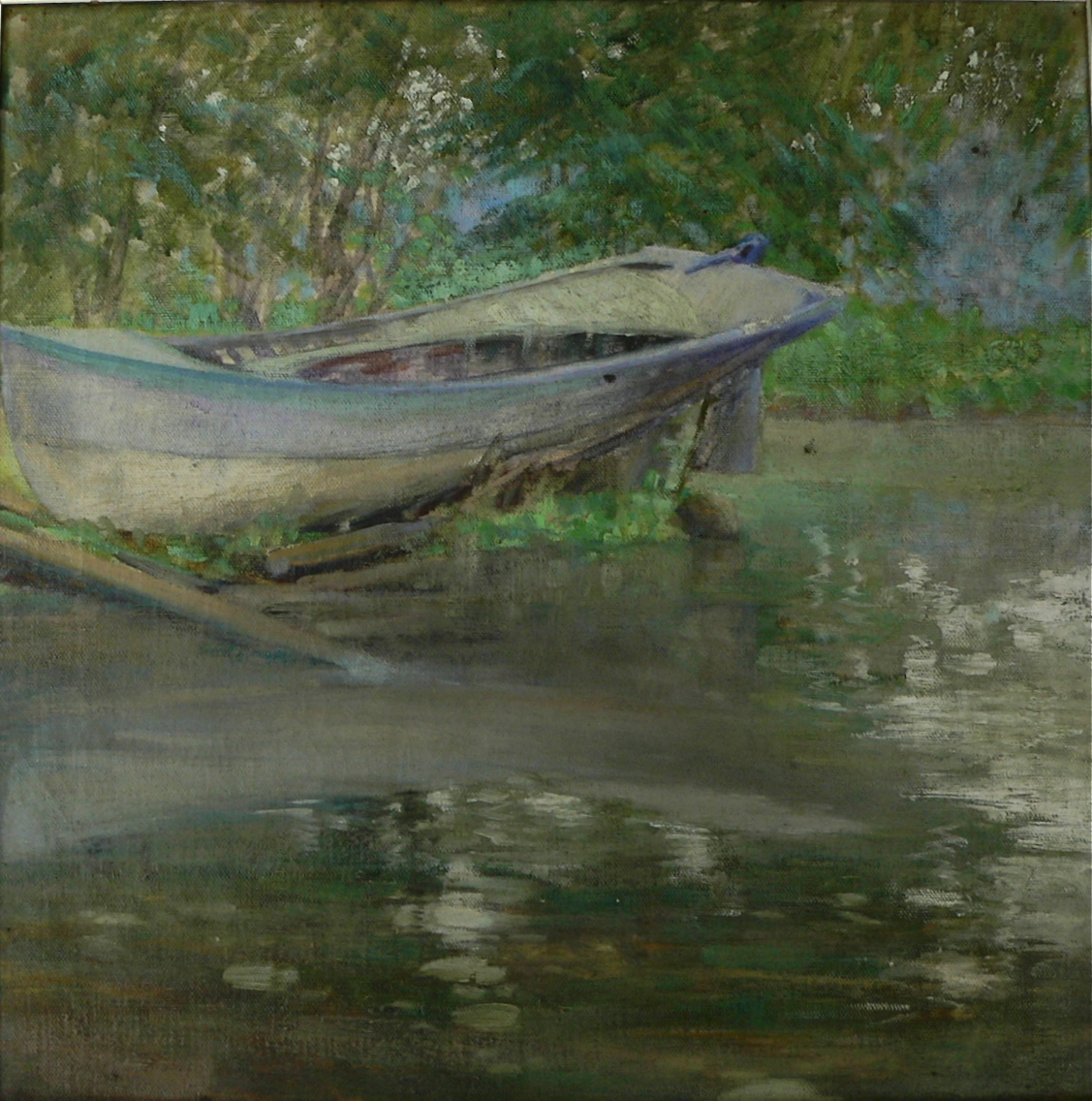
"Blue Boat" by Mary Agnes Yerkes, circa 1920, oil on canvas.

For many years the Art Institute of Chicago regularly held annual exhibits of local artists, but these ended decades ago. Mary Agnes Yerkes, (1886–1989), was an American Impressionist painter and one such exhibitor at AIC from 1912-1915. Born in Oak Park, she studied at the Chicago Academy of Fine Arts, where she also taught, and then at the currently named School of the Art Institute of Chicago. She is noted for her plein-air painting while camping the American West and its National Parks.

== Interbellum: Chicago arts between the World Wars ==
The time period between the World Wars witnessed an outpouring of artistic creativity in Chicago, led by artists of the caliber of Stanislav Szukalski, Todros Geller and Albin Polasek.

The Chicago art scene was not strictly an all-boys club however; Sr. Maria Stanisia was able to overcome the patriarchal attitudes both within early 20th century Chicago and the hierarchy of the Roman Catholic Church to become acclaimed as one of the greatest painters in the field of religious art. Another woman artist Gertrude Abercrombie who like Stanisia attended the School of the Art Institute of Chicago, sold her surrealist paintings in art fairs that took place near the Art Institute of Chicago.

== 1940s ==
Early evidence of Chicago's unique style came with Ivan Albright, with his "excruciatingly detailed surfaces depicting things in states of decay." Eldzier Cortor documented African-American life for the WPA. Vera Berdich, an influential surrealist printmaker, taught many future Chicago Imagists at the School of the Art Institute of Chicago.

== 1950s: individuality, realism, surrealism ==
Claes Oldenburg was born in Sweden and only spent a few years in the 1950s in Chicago, but he sold his first works here, 5 pieces at the 57th Street Art Fair for $25.

Post-War art in Chicago was more figurative and less abstract than the New York fashion dictated, and was largely ignored by New York dealers and critics. Chicago artists rejected the abstract aesthetics of New York modernists, preferring strong surrealism, "following their own vision," and "savage political satire."

== 1960s ==
Claire Zeisler, a pioneering fiber artist, switched from weaving to large free-standing fiber sculptures which "redefined the art form". An inspiration to many fellow fiber artists of the 1960s and beyond. Zeisler created textile works that challenged the conventional and bridged the divide between art and craft. Zeisler has shown numerous works throughout her long and notable career at the Art Institute of Chicago and beyond Chicago's city limits. But her legacy of experimentation was defined by this seminal period of artistic creation that was galvanized by her experimentation with fiber as sculpture in the 1960s.

=== The Chicago Imagists ===
In the late 1960s, a group of former students of the School of the Art Institute of Chicago, many of whom had been mentored by teacher-artist Ray Yoshida, organized a series of exhibits at the Hyde Park Art Center. Their art was notable for its surrealism and cartoon-influenced grotesques.

Strictly speaking, they were three different groups: The earliest was the "Monster Roster", which included Cosmo Campoli, Leon Golub, Nancy Spero, and Karl Wirsum; then the "Hairy Who", which included Art Green, Gladys Nilsson, and Jim Nutt; and finally the Chicago Imagists, which included Roger Brown, Ed Paschke, and Barbara Rossi.

According to Imagist Ed Paschke, the Imagists felt liberated by a lack of critical coverage. "There was a sense that no one much cared what we did here. We weren't going to get a whole lot of national attention. We could do what we wanted to do." After Paschke's death, in 2004, a New York critic infamously said that Paschke's "contribution to the art of his time was somewhat obscured by his distance from New York." At that same time, Chicago artists Tony Fitzpatrick and Wesley Kimler and art consultant Paul Klein stirred outrage when they reported that not a single Chicago museum had any of Paschke's work on display (a claim that was later disputed).

In 1972 the Chicago Imagists were given recognition in a show at the Museum of Contemporary Art.

=== The Chicago Surrealist Group ===
Under the leadership of Penelope and Franklin Rosemont, the Chicago Surrealist Group came together with both artistic and political ideals. In 1976 the group played a major role in organizing the World Surrealist Exhibition at the Gallery Black Swan.

== 1970s ==
Chicago produced several photorealists, including Arne Besser, and Richard Estes. Many photorealists were collected by Morton Neumann "against the grain of the prevailing critical thought at the time" (which espoused abstract expressionism), and exhibited at Chicago's Terra Museum of American Art.

== Chicago artists internationally ==
Over the last few decades, many contemporary Chicago artists have become internationally successful. A persistent problem for the development of art scenes in Chicago has been the fact that, in the past, a large number of artists began in Chicago, but had to relocate elsewhere before gaining attention. Curator Robert Cozzolino sees this positively, stating that we must "recognize a powerful Chicago diaspora." Such artists include Claes Oldenburg, Elizabeth Murray, Richard Estes, Robert Indiana, Joan Mitchell, Georgia O'Keeffe, and many others.

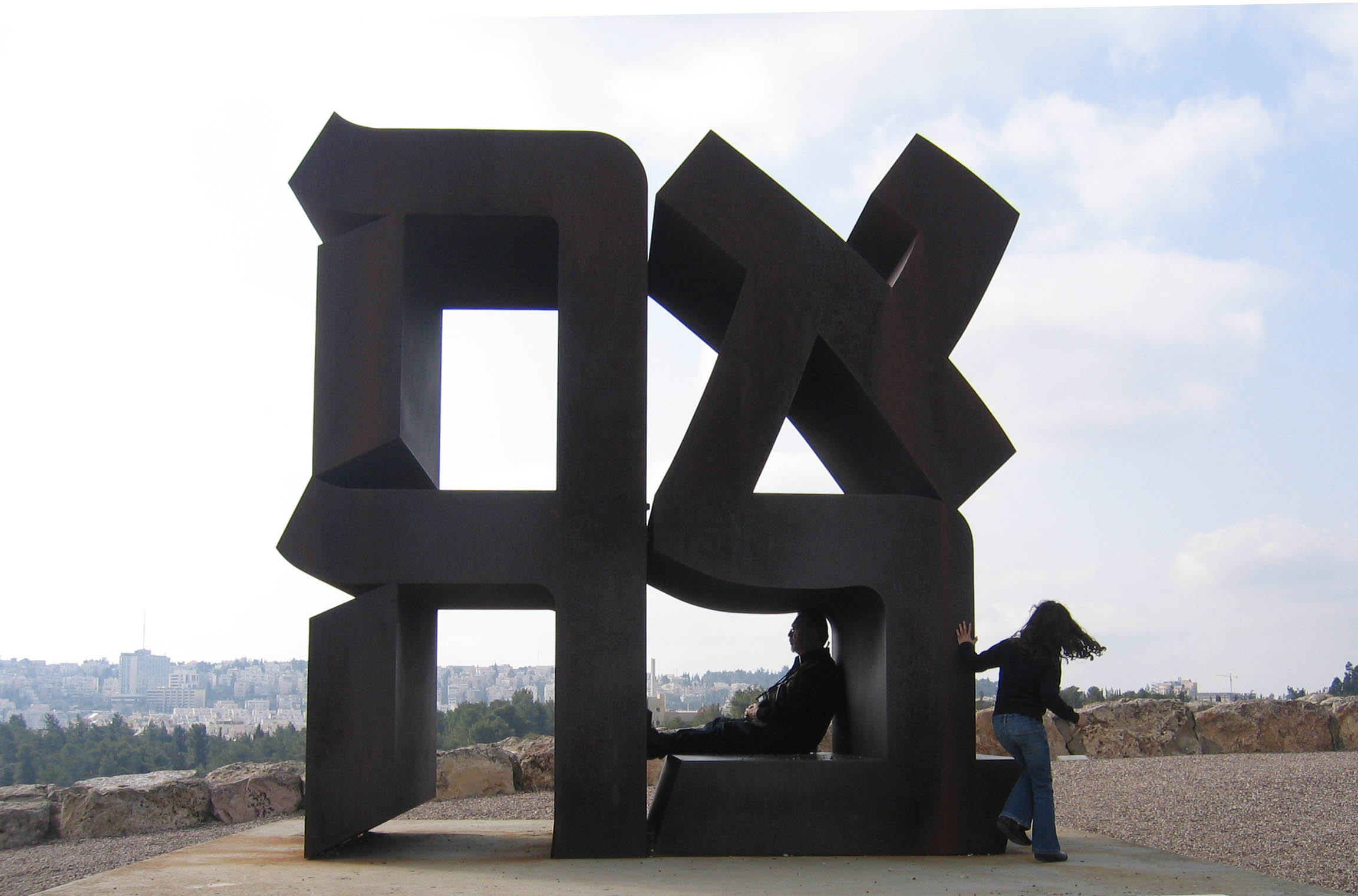
Ahava (אהבה, "love" in Hebrew), Cor-ten steel sculpture by Robert Indiana (American), 1977, Israel Museum, Jerusalem, Israel

Although no overarching theme or style characterizes Chicago's contemporary art, many contemporary critics contend that institutional support has favored Neo-Conceptual work almost to exclusion. Chicago art is nevertheless diverse and pluralistic, as is art in general. Contemporary Chicago artists continue to explore personal styles. Although abstraction has never been as strong in Chicago as in New York, there are noteworthy Chicago abstract artists, such as William Conger, who paints brightly colored, sprightly designs, and Rodney Carswell, whose work is more formal and cooler; and conceptual artists such as photographer Jeanne Dunning and installation artist Kay Rosen. Chicago's other notable contemporary artists are too numerous to name; but a few who would make any list are Kerry James Marshall, Dan Peterman, Gregg Bordowitz, Julia Fish, Wesley Kimler, Tony Fitzpatrick and Iñigo Manglano-Ovalle.

=== Painters ===
Robert Guinan paints psychologically penetrating portraits of bar patrons and jazz musicians which are very popular in France, but he is almost unknown in Chicago. Laurie Hogin continues the grotesque Chicago tradition with lush, Dutch-style portraits of cartoonishly savage animals. Ellen Lanyon's paintings show "fairy-tale gentleness and antiquarian whimsy." Tony Phillips paints enigmatic figurative works combining soft modeling, fantastical or archetypal scenarios, and sometimes-dark psychological explorations. Riva Lehrer, herself disabled, paints intense, sympathetic, surreal portraits of disabled persons. Richard Loving paints luminous, spiritual abstractions. Tim Lowly, who has mastered the difficult medium of egg tempera, paints heartbreaking spiritual pictures of seemingly ill children. Audrey Niffenegger paints beautifully weird surreal images and writes acclaimed fiction as well. Frank Piatek paints not-quite-abstracts of giant, writhing tube-forms. Judith Raphael paints pugnacious little girls posed like classical artworks. Patrick Skoff leaves his paintings in public places for people to find and keep. Matt Lamb, a self-taught artist, creates luminous expressionist paintings with bold uses of color, whimsical figures and symbols, and unlikely combinations of mediums. Maria Tomasula paints exquisitely realistic, symbolic still-lives. Wesley Kimler paints expressive, gestural, hybrid paintings that combine abstract and figurative elements in theatrical, sometimes grotesque and highly creative ways. John F. Miller taught for a few decades at the SAIC and, during the bulk of that period, produced paintings and some drawings in an abstract style. Since the late 1990s, Miller has produced most of his work using computers and graphics software. Mark Staff Brandl combines the influences of comic books, sign-painting and philosophy in talented paintings and installations which are accessible, intellectually demanding, and warily subversive.

=== Sculptors, textile art ===
Cat Chow constructs dresses out of subversive materials. Neil Goodman is known for largely abstract bronze sculpture that ranges from still-life compositions and free-standing works to wall and floor installations to monumental public art. Richard Hunt sculpts ruggedly abstract commentaries on social issues. Kerry James Marshall paints and sculpts multi-media works commenting on African-American life.

=== Photography ===
These same impulses also appeared in Chicago's lively Street photography scene, gaining notoriety through artists centered around the Institute of Design such as Harry Callahan, Aaron Siskind, Leon Lewandowski as well as in the work of nanny-savant Vivian Maier. Ray K. Metzker and Barbara Crane studied at the Institute of Design in the 1950s. They spread the ideas of the Institute of Design teaching photography in the second half of the 20th century. Metzker was Philadelphia based and Crane was based in Chicago. Bob Thall's beautiful, bleak photographs of Chicago-area architecture have also won much acclaim.

=== Illustration, printmaking ===
Contemporary illustrators include Jay Ryan, whose hand-silkscreened posters have advertised many a rock band, and fantasist Scott Gustafson. Tony Fitzpatrick etches wild, detailed, tattoo-like pop images.

=== Public art ===
Chicago had a revival, dating to the 1960s, of public mural art, involving local artists and community members. The Wall of Respect was one of the murals to spark this explosion. The mural was first painted in 1967 by the Visual Arts Workshop of the Organization of Black American Culture (OBAC). It is considered the first large-scale, outdoor community mural, which spawned a movement across the U.S. and internationally.

Chicago Public Art Group is a non profit cultural organization in Chicago that organizes and promotes creation of community public art. Founded in 1971, the group has created numerous projects both painted and bricolage mosaics in city underpasses.

In recent year's Chicago mural scene has exploded with projects like The B Line, the Wabash Arts Corridor, The Brown Walls Project, and The Mile of Murals.

Jeff Zimmerman paints photorealistic portrait murals, which can be found in various neighborhoods and restaurants in Chicago and Cincinnati.

== Irreverence, satire ==
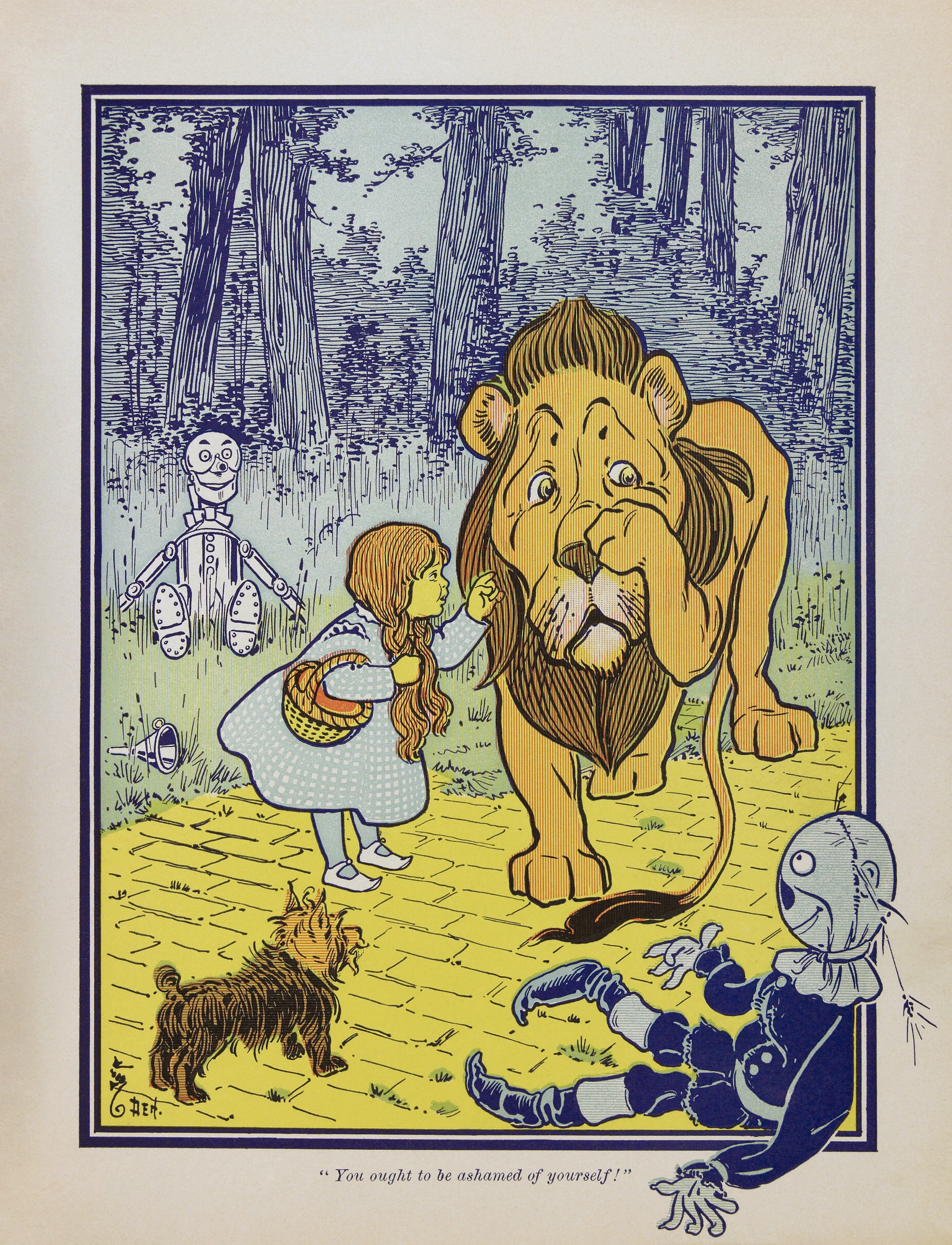
W. W. Denslow's illustration of The Wonderful Wizard of Oz.

Chicago has a strong tradition of satirical, even grotesque art and illustration. The early books of L. Frank Baum were illustrated with the strange work of William Wallace Denslow. The Chicago tradition of political satire is seen in cartoonish artist Hy Roth, and actual cartoonists Heather McAdams and Nicole Hollander. Other Chicago cartoonists recognised by the art world include Lynda Barry, Dan Clowes, Jay Lynch and Chris Ware (whose work was shown at the 2002 Whitney Biennial). Significant comics artists from Chicago include Jessica Abel, "Herblock" (Herbert Block), animator Walt Disney, adventure satirist Phil Foglio, and goth cartoonist Jill Thompson.

== Self-taught artists and Outsider Art ==
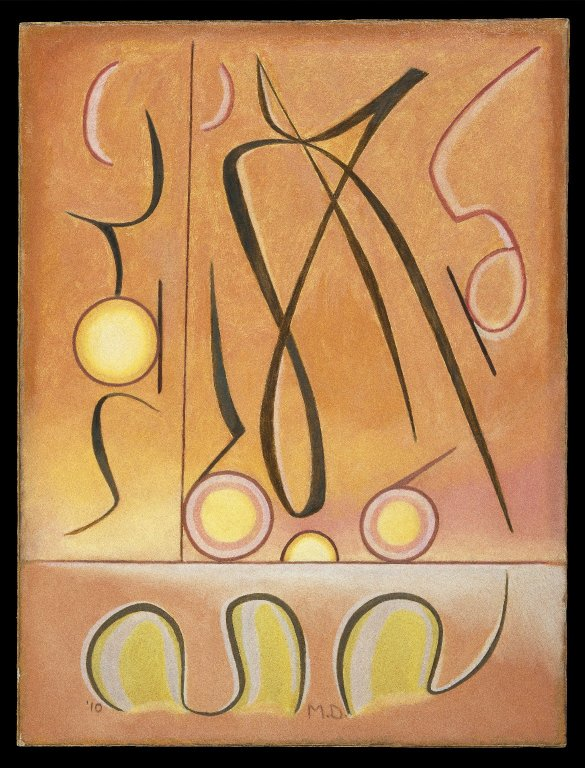
Xdx by Manierre Dawson from ca. 1910

"Chicago emerged early on as an outpost for outsider art," according to critic Andrew Patner.

Manierre Dawson was an early self-taught artist, who began painting abstracts in 1910. He was invited to display in the Armory Show.

In the 1990s, a group of Chicago collectors, including Bob Roth, founder of the Chicago Reader, and Ann Nathan and Judy Saslow, both of whom opened acclaimed galleries, organized Intuit: The Center for Intuitive and Outsider Art, which leads tours of Midwestern self-taught artists and has its own exhibition space.

Paul Waggoner, an eccentric himself, was an art dealer and champion of outsider art.

Carl Hammer, an art dealer in Chicago, has handled much strange, figurative outsider art, including the epic novel, illustrated with hermaphroditic girls traced from coloring books, of Henry Darger, and the naive portraits of society ladies of Lee Godie. Hammer also represents Mr. Imagination, a self-taught bottlecap muralist. Mr. Imagination, whose work is in several museums, also participated in the 2007 public art project, "Cool Globes: Hot Ideas for a Cooler Planet".

== Troubles and controversies ==
In the 1980s, the Museum of Contemporary Art, along with the Art Institute of Chicago and Chicago's Department of Cultural Affairs, attempted to put on a show of contemporary Chicago art. Called "The Chicago Show", it was supposed to celebrate Chicago's artistic diversity. Embarrassingly, 84 of the 90 artists chosen by the 5-member blind jury were found to be white. The organizers published an apology in the exhibit catalogue and invited twenty minority artists who had not been juried in to participate. Half of the invited artists, angered by this condescension, refused and organized a counter-exhibit at the Chicago Cultural Center.

On April 15, 1989, the same night that the Hyde Park Art Center celebrated its 50th anniversary, a devastating fire destroyed most of an entire block of important galleries and art spaces in the River North gallery district.

In spring of 1996, the Feigen, Inc. gallery's exhibit of Gregory Green's "10,000 Doses" and "Recipe for Making 'LSD' in the Kitchen" was raided by the Chicago police, who confiscated and broke open the artworks. No drugs were found.

In 1996 the Museum of Contemporary Art, to get over the embarrassment of "The Chicago Show", attempted a survey of Chicago Art called "Art in Chicago: 1945-1995". It was criticized by the press as cramped, inadequate, and incomprehensive. Its catalogue was judged a disappointment by Dennis Adrian, an art critic and participant, who called it "visually ... an atrocity of staggering proportions."

=== Visual arts coverage ===
Chicago Gallery News, a magazine founded in 1982 by Natalie van Straaten to cover the openings of the 'Original 16' group of galleries that had moved to or opened around Superior and Huron Streets in Chicago, continues to promote local and regional exhibitions and art openings. It has continually been published in print three times a year since its founding, listing gallery shows and events. Ginny Berg Van Alyea took over as publisher in 2007 and has featured interviews with artists, gallery owners, art collectors and other members of the art community. CGN continues to be the publication of record for the arts in Chicago and the region. Currently the magazine and website feature over 100 galleries and art spaces, as well as an art services directory.

In the last decade, the major /national print publications based Chicago have ceased seriously covering the visual arts. In 2009, the Chicago Reader, an alternative weekly newspaper, reduced its formerly complete art listings of galleries and museums and regular art reviews by Fred Camper to "a smattering of listings and pictures". The Chicago Tribune, one of Chicago's two major newspapers, never had gallery or art listings and fired its sole dedicated fine arts reporter, Alan G. Artner, in 2009. And the Chicago Sun-Times, the other of Chicago's two major newspapers, has no gallery or art listings and no dedicated arts reporter, although Kevin Nance has covered some fine art issues along with movies and popular culture.

Gallery Guide was a bi-monthly magazine with a Chicago/midwest edition which was similar in that it covered local arts listings, but it was published from New Jersey by Blouin Media and ultimately folded.

Additionally, The New Art Examiner (from Chicago) and Dialogue magazine (Columbus, Ohio) reported on Chicago and midwestern arts communities until they both folded in 2002, though the New Art Examiner relaunched in 2015'

However, smaller online and print publications have continued to cover the art scene in Chicago and have increased dramatically in number in recent years. Since 1988, New City Magazine has covered the visual arts in Chicago, joined in the 1990s by Lumpen Magazine.. Gapers Block, a Chicago-focused web publication established in 2003, added coverage with their arts and culture section. They were soon followed by Paul Klein's Art Letter in 2004 and the Bad At Sports podcast and blog in 2005. In 2008, print-based Proximity Magazine was established, joined by two more print publications, Jettison Quarterly, and The School of the Art Institute's F News Magazine in 2009. Also in 2009, Chicago Art Magazine broke off of Art Talk Chicago, part of the Chicago Tribune-sponsored blog network, to start their own independent online platform. Chicago Art Review, which ran from 2009-2011 and is currently in hiatus, began in 2009 as well. In 2010, Sixty Inches From Center was established and includes The Chicago Arts Archive, a web publication focusing on visual art in Chicago.

Additionally, Chicago Artists Resource, launched by the Department of Cultural Affairs in 2005, provides articles on visual art in addition to providing resources and tools for Chicago artists.

Local artists' interests are represented by the Chicago Artists' Coalition, a nonprofit advocacy organization, which has a monthly newsletter, the Chicago Artists' News.

== See also ==
- Culture of Chicago
- List of museums and cultural institutions in Chicago
- Visual arts of the United States
- Chicago Public Art Group
- EXPO Chicago
