= Neil Goodman =

American sculptor

- Born: 1953 (age 72–73); Hammond, Indiana, United States
- Education: Tyler School of Art; Kansas City Art Institute; Indiana University Bloomington
- Known for: Sculpture, public art
- Spouse: JoEllyn Codespoti Goodman
- Children: Maurice Goodman; Hana Goodman; Jenna Wright, Stephen Stults
- Awards: Public commissions: City of Chicago, Brauer Museum of Art, Museum of Outdoor Arts, Indiana University Northwest
- Website: Neil Goodman Sculpture

Neil Goodman (born 1953) is an American sculptor and educator, known for bronze works that combine elegant arrangements and forms with hand-wrought, textured surfaces. He has explored a wide range of formats—still-life compositions, wall and floor installations, free-standing works and monumental public art—in a formalist style that has evolved from spare representation to abstraction and minimalism.

Neil Goodman, museum installation at Indiana State Museum, cast bronze and fiberglass works, 2006.

Goodman's sculpture has been featured at the Museum of Contemporary Art Chicago ("Art in Chicago 1945-1995" survey), Indianapolis Museum of Art, Brauer Museum of Art, and Museum of Outdoor Arts (2018). He has been awarded public commissions for Chicago's McCormick Place, the Block Museum of Art, Indiana University Northwest, and cities in Connecticut, Indiana and Michigan. Curator Gregg Hertzlieb describes Goodman's abstract sculptures as "sophisticated explorations of formal issues [that] concurrently pulse with organic life … and appeal to the hand, the eye, and the mind." New Art Examiner editor Kathryn Hixson called him a "sculptor's sculptor" whose "purposeful craftsmanship of ritualistic tableaux and talismanic objects" engages "the sensual shift from two to three dimensions."

After being based in the Chicago area and teaching at Indiana University Northwest for most of his career, Goodman lives and works in the town of Los Alamos on the central coast of California.

== Early life and career ==
Goodman was born in 1953 in Hammond, Indiana, a steel-mill city outside of Chicago, whose industrial rust-belt landscape remains a key influence. His college studies began in philosophy and religion, before he turned to pottery and then sculpture at Indiana University Bloomington (BA, Fine Arts and Religious Studies, 1976). In the late 1970s, he was drawn to working in metal and completed postgraduate studies in sculpture at the Kansas City Art Institute (1977) and Tyler School of Art in Philadelphia (MFA, Sculpture and Ceramics, 1979). He secured a teaching position at Indiana University Northwest (IUN) in Gary in 1979 as a founding member of the Fine Arts department. In 1991, he purchased a two-story residential loft building on Chicago's south side that served as his studio and a home for him, his wife, JoEllyn Codespoti Goodman, and their children, Maurice and Hana Goodman, Jenna Wright and Stephen Stults.

Goodman emerged in the Chicago art scene with a two-person exhibition at the Chicago Cultural Center in 1980, group shows at the Illinois State Museum and Dart, Struve, Roy Boyd and Randolph Street galleries, and solo shows at Frumkin & Struve Gallery (his first in Chicago) and the Indianapolis Center alumni for Contemporary Art, among others. His later exhibitions include mid-career surveys at the Chicago Cultural Center (1997) and Indiana State Museum (2006), a retrospective at the Museum of Outdoor Arts (2018), and solos at the Fred Jones Jr. Museum of Art (1994), Brauer Museum of Art (2016), and Perimeter, Klein and Carl Hammer galleries in Chicago.

Since 2017, Goodman has been an Emeritus Professor of Fine Arts at IUN, after nearly four decades there teaching and serving as department chair (1998–2001, 2007–11).

== Work and reception ==
Neil Goodman, Triptych, cast bronze, 64" x 72" x 5.5", 1988.

Goodman's career is noted for its consistent modernist formal vocabulary, which has evolved through nuanced but significant experimentation from representation and narrative toward abstraction and minimalism; he cites Giacometti and Brâncuși as important touchstones. His work—primarily in bronze—is unified by: a visual grammar that emphasizes balance and strong lines; a workmanlike mastery of technique and craft, including casting and painstaking hand-finished surfaces; an emphasis on presentation and the relationship of sculpture to various spaces (pedestals, walls, floors, galleries, outdoors); and contrasts between industrial, architectural and geometric forms and natural-organic elements and textures. James Yood and Alan Artner, among others, note his sensitivity to bronze—its patina, luster, and malleability—which follows in the tradition of masters such as Henry Moore, Marini, Maillol and Giacometti.

=== Early work (1979–1993) ===
Goodman's early sculpture combines representation and abstraction, oblique narrative, and an almost archaeological concern with objects and the passage of time. Formally, it defies sculptural convention, interpreting painterly strategies, such as the still life and frontal, single-plane presentation, in bronze. Critics identify painters Pierre Chardin and Giorgio Morandi as key influences, while also relating the bio-abstraction of Arp, Brancusi, Isamu Noguchi and Yves Tanguy and the vitalist sculpture of Moore and Barbara Hepworth.

Goodman first gained attention for intimate, low-lying still lifes that bring together disparate artifacts and architectural elements in elegant familiar tableaux suggesting dinner settings or shelf arrangements (e.g., Still Life with Catfish, 1979; Still Life #1, 1988). ARTnews critic Garrett Holg writes that the combinations of common, man-made objects (rods, bowls, glasses, forks) and droll castings of temporal organic forms (vegetables, fish) formed "a profoundly eloquent discourse on the still life." James Yood wrote that Goodman's "isolated and huddled" objects and pitted and scumbled surfaces convey hard-won existence and anonymous heroism with a "majesty and quality of restraint reminiscent of Chardin."

Goodman's imposing, freestanding "Cage" works have been likened to open-backed reliefs resembling altarpieces, which use thin, vertical architectonic frameworks to define and section interior spaces into platforms and compartments for the display of abstract and representational (bowls, fish, implements) forms. Critics highlight the series' complex interrelationships and compositional variety, which ranges from near-screens of hieroglyphic-like screens (Triptych, 1988) to delicate, shadow-box-like balances of fluid, multi-dimensional space (Cyclades, 1986; Cage #4, 1988). Goodman's "Bellingham Series" (1990) offers "mini-assemblages" of reinvented nautical tools and other forms, whose significance rely less on symbolism than on sensitive, asymmetrical compositions (e.g., Ledge and Prop) that hint at Cubist-like fragmentation.

Neil Goodman, Biography, cast bronze, 9' x 15' x 6", 2011.

=== Wall and floor groupings (1994– ) ===
Goodman made a dramatic shift with his site-specific installation Subjects/Objects (1994), which fully realized the frontality of earlier work and broke with traditional in-the-round sculptural presentation. It consisted of forty-seven free-floating, hand-wrought bronze wall-objects in a modular arrangement that emphasized dynamic rhythms achieved through contrasts between horizontal and vertical lines, organic and geometric shapes, and activated negative space; critics likened the groupings of seemingly natural, ceremonial and utilitarian artifacts to a museum archaeological display or tools organized on a pegboard. Noting the objects' intimacy and detailed textures, Kathryn Hixson wrote that Goodman "dismantles the hype of monumental Modernism in favor of a hand-held, more useful version." In later installations at IUN (Subjects-Objects, 1996) and the Chicago Cultural Center (1998), Goodman explored arrangements that migrated across floors rather than walls.

Goodman's free-floating separation of elements without containing or shared supports also detached his work from the self-referential traditions of formalism and the art-object, transforming it into something open-ended and interior like language, which viewers are left to complete. Margaret Hawkins links this aspect formally and symbolically to Goodman's traditional Jewish youth reading Hebrew, which shares a sense of heightened meaning derived from code-like forms; the connection is most evident in two subsequent public wall commissions: Temple Jeremiah (1995, Northbrook, Illinois) and Jewish Heritage Museum (1998, Danville, California).

In 1997, Goodman created Passage for Chicago's McCormick Place South Pavilion, a 90' x 15' permanent wall installation that features an "alphabet" of more than 130 forms, many nautical, reflecting its lakeside locale; a triangular-shaped, stairwell wall-piece, Subject-Object (2000), resides in the Block Museum of Art in Evanston, Illinois. With the later works Biography (2011) and Eclipse (2014), Goodman returned to monumental wall-works, in this case linking bronze elements in the manner of chain mail; ARTnews likened the former to a giant pendant of blade forms evocative of symbolic code, tribal ornamentation and "mod, space-age forms."

=== Outdoor public sculpture and gallery work (2000– ) ===
After winning a competition in 2000 to create an outdoor work for the Dow Centennial Sculpture Garden in Midland, Michigan (Centennial Passage), Goodman began conceiving sculptures in terms of site-specificity and multiple vantage points, encouraging viewers to move around and look at and through sculptures to notice shifting forms, voids and relationships to architecture, space, and landscape. More inclusive, participatory and conversational—as suits the social dimension of public art—this work was also, in formal terms, emphatically linear and more minimal, open and three-dimensional. This approach extended to Goodman's gallery exhibitions, which often presented motifs and works later adapted for monumental outdoor pieces and recreated the ensemble sense of a sculpture park, with great attention to placement, scale, lighting and interrelationships.

Neil Goodman, Night and Day, cast bronze, 16' x 7' x 8" (without base), 2019.

Between 2000 and 2006, Goodman developed his "Shadows and Echoes" works, which redefine and re-contextualize their environments through linear windows, frames and passages. The series—formally unified by repetitions of line, module and motif (loops, arcs, arches, pyramids, wedges)—was inspired by disparate sources connected by inherent design structures: abstracted nature (e.g., Slither, Reach), geometry (Four Corners), industrial leftovers (Crank, Mirror), the arabesques of the Moorish Alhambra (Andalusia). Curator Geoffrey Bates describes them as sculpted with a "beautifully controlled" fine line rather than mass, "creating sculptural presence from empty space"; Margaret Hawkins describes them as "light as paper" and airy, like music or mathematical equations, despite their heft. The series culminated in a sculpture garden at the center of the IUN campus that features ten monumental bronze outdoor sculptures interacting with a native landscape designed by Cynthia Owen-Bergland. In 2010, Goodman installed five "Shadows and Echoes" works cast in fiberglass in an outdoor exhibition at the Nathan Manilow Sculpture Park in University Park, Illinois.

In his exhibitions of the 2010s, Goodman continued to pare down motifs inspired by industrial, geometric, and natural forms in freestanding, floor and wall pieces that retain their varied, organic surfaces. His vertical, roughly human-sized, freestanding "Columns" (2015–7) repeat, invert, and conjoin basic "U" shapes with blade-like forms in bronze, creating a linear, rhythmic interplay that implies both anthropomorphic and anthropological references (e.g., Cabal and Twist). Robin Dluzen suggests that the light networks of intersecting lines in pieces such as Turn reflect the rowed vineyards of California, Goodman's new home.

A second, horizontal series employs shard-like, trapezoidal forms of greater mass with rectangular "windows" or openings that maximize the synergy of positive and negative spaces, and like earlier work, offer shifting perspectives on their surroundings (e.g., Twilight I and Twilight II). Presented as pedestal pieces in gallery shows, these works doubled as studies for the monumental outdoor bronze sculptures Night and Day (2019, commissioned by the Brauer Museum for Valparaiso University) and Rudder (2017, Museum of Outdoor Arts). Margaret Hawkins and other writers describe these later outdoor works as less about substance than about their voids—"yawning, crooked windows" that frame views and allude to spiritual questions, such as the relationship between being and non-being.

In his exhibition "Through a Different Lens" (2022), Goodman presented two bronze sculpture series that continued to bear the influence of the California landscape: small "window" or "lens" works designed to be looked through and a series he described as "gateways." These taller, elongated works (e.g., Crown, 2018–21), suggested both anthropomorphic forms and topographic views of the coast when viewed frontally.

== Writing ==
In his later career, Goodman has also turned to art writing, contributing reviews, essays and interviews to the New Art Examiner. His subjects have included the Confederate Mound at Chicago's Oak Woods Cemetery, artists including John Henry, Richard Hunt, Martin Puryear, Rembrandt, Richard Rezac, Richard Serra, Peter Shelton, Adam Silverman and Kehinde Wiley, and a memorial to the late Chicago art dealer, Paul Klein. He also wrote the introductory essay for the book, Contemporary Sculptors of Chicago (2020), and an essay for the catalog Night and Day, for his commission at Valparaiso University (2020).

== Recognition and collections ==
In addition to aforementioned works, Goodman has been awarded public commissions by the City of Chicago (Chicago Public Library, 1995; Martin Luther King Gateway Renovation, 1996; Geography Earth, 2002, Burnham Park Children's Garden), UBS Warburg Tower (2002), Greater Hartford Arts Council/Lincoln Financial (Frontier Life, 2009, Hartford, Connecticut), the Munster (Indiana) Public Art Committee (Prairie Passage, 2009, with Terry Karpowicz), and Indiana University Northwest (Tapestry, 2011).

His work belongs to the public art collections of the Brauer Museum of Art, Illinois State Museum, Indiana State Museum, Madden Museum of Art, Museum of Outdoor Arts, Nathan Manilow Sculpture Park (Governors State University), Racine Art Museum and Rockford Museum of Art, as well as many corporate and private collections.
