= Wesley Kimler =

American painter

Wesley Kimler (born 1953) is an American artist based in Chicago, Illinois, known for his colossal paintings, up to 15 feet high and 27 feet wide. According to critic Kevin Nance, these are "expressive, gestural, hybrid paintings that combine abstract and figurative elements in a way that's theatrical and beautiful, sometimes grotesque and surreal, and always powerfully evocative."

== History ==
Wesley Kimler was born in Billings, Montana. His family moved to California in 1959, where Kimler lived until he left home at the age of 14. Thereafter, he lived in San Francisco, Taos, New Mexico (where he studied music), Vancouver, British Columbia, Canada, and Afghanistan. In that country, the then 20-year-old Kimler lived in Herat, Kandahar and Kabul, working as an agent for a dealer in traditional carpets.

Kimler first began to paint at the age of 21, studying one year at the Laguna Gloria School of Art in Austin, Texas and 2 years at the Minneapolis College of Art and Design.

The artist first showed in the mid-1980s at Frumkin-Struve (later simply Struve) Gallery in Chicago.

== Artistic views ==
He has given outspoken interviews in which he champions painting, attacks what he views as the Neo-Conceptual academy and the artworld hierarchy, advocating independence and self-reliance on the part of creators. He is also known in the contemporary Chicago artworld for his work rallying for a new art scene. Nicknamed "the Shark" due to his fierceness in discussions, he organized a website and e-zine Sharkforum with fellow artist David Roth, which includes Museum of Contemporary Art curator Lynne Warren, photographer and film critic Ray Pride and artist and theorist Mark Staff Brandl. The artists active on his site also exhibit together under the name the Sharkpack.

== Exhibitions ==
In addition to the Struve Gallery exhibitions in 1985, 86, 87 and 90, other notable shows by Kimler include those at Barbara Kornblatt Gallery in Washington, DC in 1986, LA Louver Gallery in Los Angeles in 1987 and 1990, Paula Anglim in San Francisco in 1990, "The Real Deal" with artists Ed Paschke and Tony Fitzpatrick in 1994, a Museum of Contemporary Art Chicago solo exhibition in 1995, as well as inclusion in "Art in Chicago, 1945-1995" exhibition at the latter institution in 1996.

Kimler's art has been acquired by many institutions including the Metropolitan Museum of Art in New York, the Berkeley Art Museum in Berkeley, California, the Norton Museum of Art in West Palm Beach, Florida, the Weisman Art Museum in Minneapolis, Minnesota, and in Chicago's Block Museum, Smart Museum, Aon Tower and Museum of Contemporary Art, as well as in numerous private collections.

Lisa Wainwright, a professor of art history and dean of graduate studies at the School of the Art Institute of Chicago, has said of Kimler's art: "It's heroic, moral painting. He lives and breathes his art in the way the great painters did."
