= Sabina Ott =

American artist

- Born: October 8, 1955; New York City, New York, U.S.
- Died: June 26, 2018 (aged 62); Chicago, Illinois, U.S.
- Known for: Painting Sculpture Installation art
- Notable work: Public art work: Chicago Transit Authority
- Movement: American postmodernism
- Spouse: John Paulett
- Awards: National Endowment for the Arts Individual Artists Grant 1990; John Simon Guggenheim Memorial Foundation Fellowship 2015
- Website: sabinaott.net

Sabina Ott (October 8, 1955 – June 26, 2018) was an American artist known for her broad range of work—from painting to installation to sculpture—and her central role in the art world as teacher, administrator, and recently, as the founder of the exhibition space Terrain, which invites artists to create installations and performances using the exterior of her Oak Park home.

== Career ==
Exhibiting since 1985, Ott participated in over 100 solo and group exhibitions at institutions in Sao Paulo, Brazil; Auckland, New Zealand; Melbourne, Australia; and many cities across the U.S. Her work is in numerous museum collections including The Whitney Museum of American Art, Los Angeles County Museum of Art and the Oakland Museum of Art, and has been reviewed in Art in America, Art Forum, New Art Examiner, The New York Times, and The Los Angeles Times, among other publications.

She received a Guggenheim Fellowship for 2015-16, and recently completed a public art commission for the Chicago Transit Authority and a solo exhibition at the Chicago Cultural Center. She was represented by Aspect/Ratio Gallery in Chicago.

She earned both her Bachelor of Fine Arts and Master of Fine Arts from the San Francisco Art Institute.

== Death ==
Ott died on June 26, 2018, in Chicago, Illinois, at age 62.

== Recognition ==
Exhibiting beginning in 1985, Ott participated in over 100 solo and group exhibitions at institutions in São Paulo, Brazil; Auckland, New Zealand; Melbourne, Australia; and many cities across the US. Her work is in numerous museum collections including The Whitney Museum of American Art, Los Angeles County Museum of Art and the Oakland Museum of Art. She has been reviewed in Art in America, Art Forum, New Art Examiner, The New York Times and The Los Angeles Times, among other publications. She was Professor of Art at Columbia College in Chicago.

Ott received a National Endowment for the Arts Individual Artists Grant in 1990 and a Howard Foundation Grant from Brown University for research combining digital media and painting in 2001. Ott was awarded a John Simon Guggenheim Memorial Foundation Fellowship in 2015.

Ott was recognized by The Chicago Tribune as the 2015 Chicagoan of the Year in Art and was awarded Distinguished Teaching of Art Award by the College Art Association in 2016.

== Exhibitions ==
1. "who cares for the sky?" Hyde Park Art Center February 21 – May 1, 2016
2. "here and there pink melon joy" Chicago Cultural Center August 30, 2014 – January 4, 2015
3. "Sabina Ott: Ornament" Riverside Arts Center November 23 – January 11, 2014
4. "Scape" The Franklin, Chicago, with artists Alison Ruttan, Joe Jeffers, Assaf Evron and Alex Tam
5. "to perceive the invisible in you" St. Xavier University, Chicago: (catalog essay by Dr. Alison Fraunhar), 2012
6. "Frequently the Woods are Pink" Sabina Ott and Michelle Wasson, What It Is, Oak Park, Illinois May 2 – June 5, 2010
7. "What Is Always Is" Sub–City Projects, Chicago, 2010
8. "what's not here is nowhere" University of Texas, San Antonio: (catalog essays by Christopher Miles and Sue Spaid), 2006

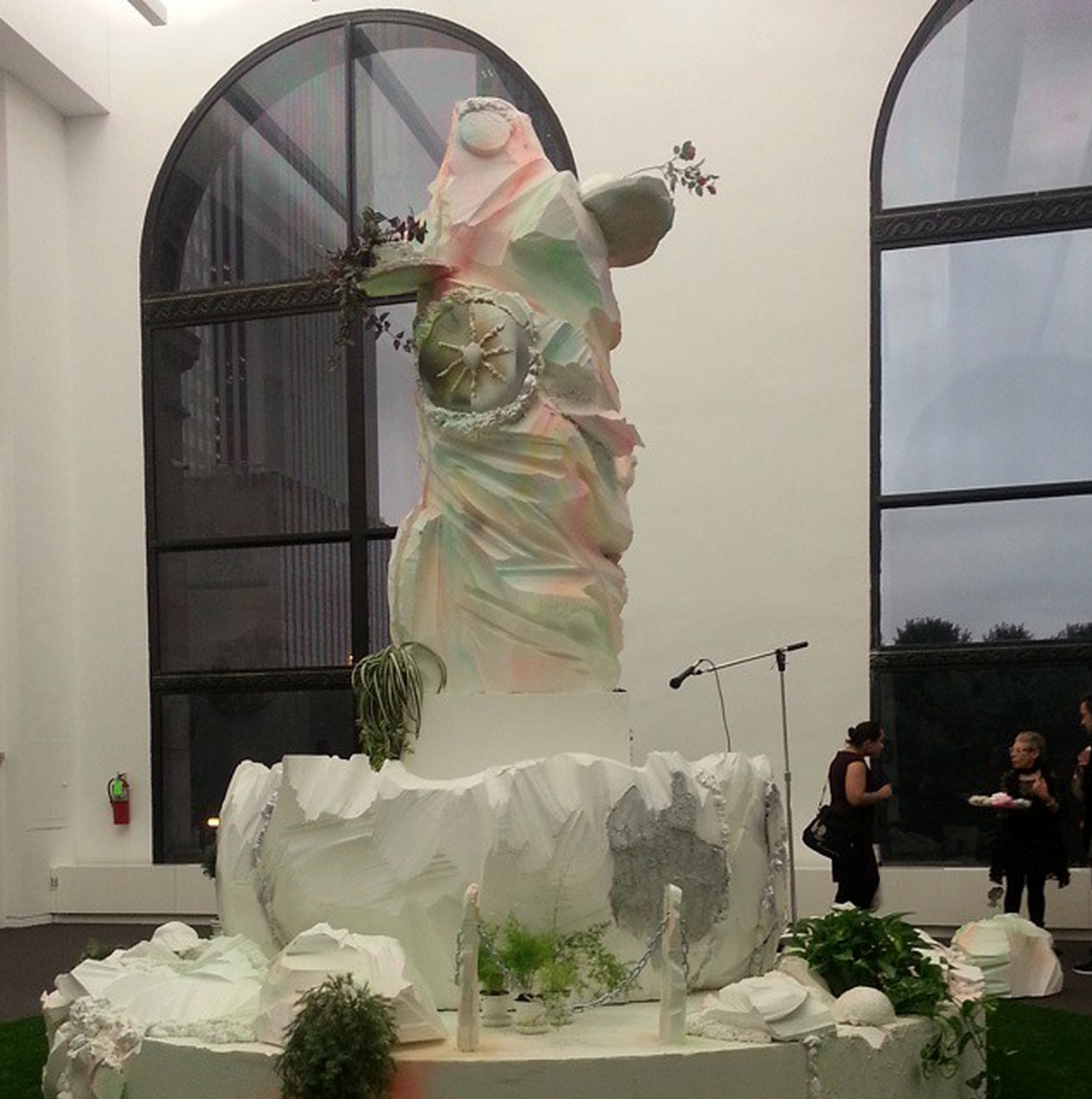
here and there pink melon joy at the Chicago Cultural Center by Sabina Ott

== Terrain exhibitions ==
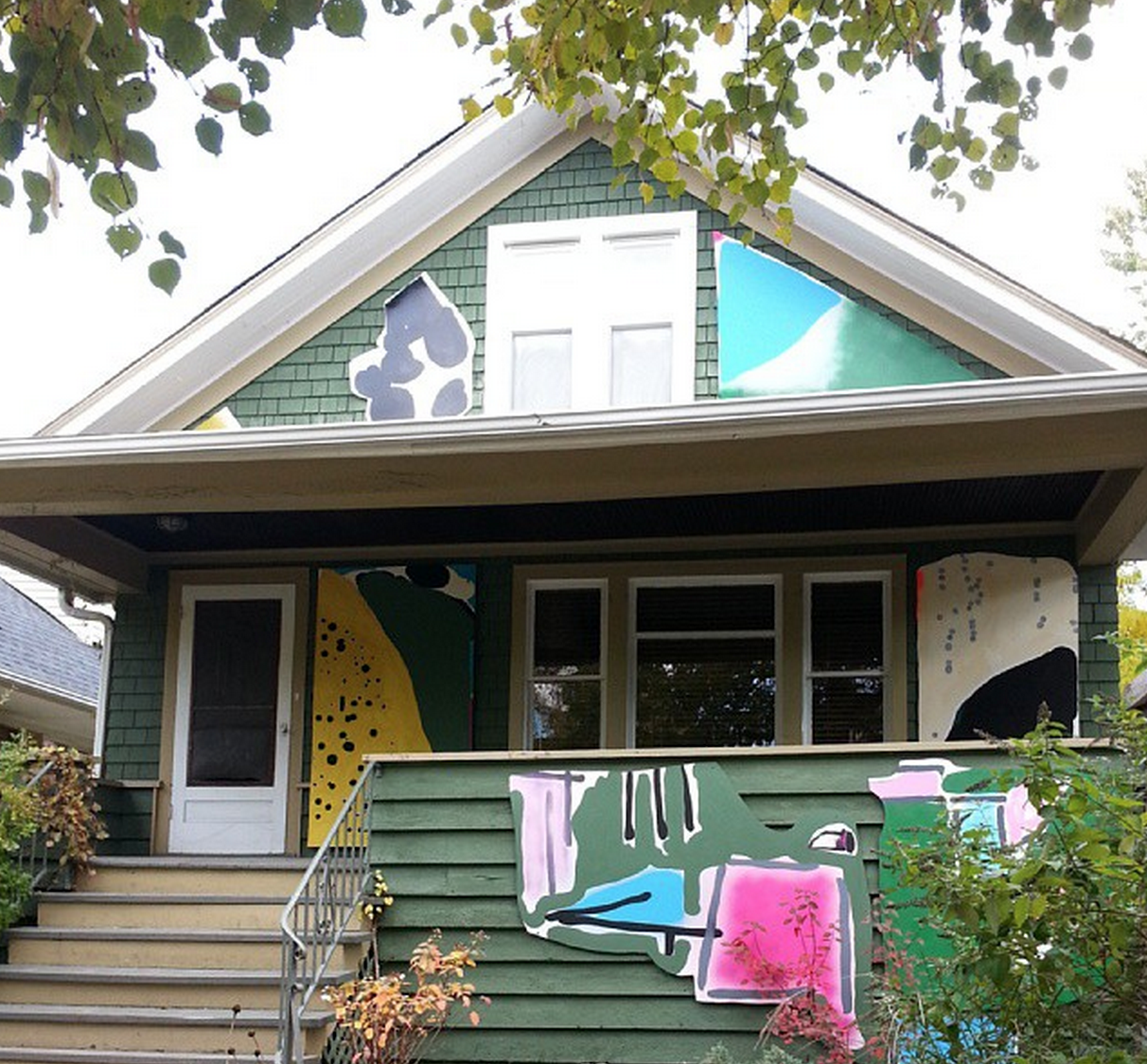
Terrain Exhibitions, with work by Leslie Baum 11/03/2013

In 2011 Sabina Ott co-founded Terrain Exhibitions with writer John Paulett. Terrain Exhibitions is an artist run project space in Oak Park, Illinois. Terrain Exhibitions differs from most artist run or "apartment spaces" insofar as the artists works are exhibited outdoors in the front yard and are accessible 24 hours a day, 365 days per year. Ott and Paulett invite artists to create interventions into the conventional or traditional idea of what a front yard should be and how it might function.

Ott and Paulett ask artists to consider the differences between private and public space and explore intersections between decoration and utility. Terrain Exhibitions is located across from Longfellow School in Oak Park, at the intersection of Highland and Jackson Avenues. Exhibiting artists have included Claire Ashley, Lise Haller Baggesen, Leslie Baum, Judith Brotman, (f)utility Projects, Michelle Grabner, Brad Killam, Anna Kunz, and Jeroen Nelemans.

In addition to Terrain Exhibitions, Ott and Paulett also organize the Terrain Biennial, a monthlong exhibition that asks the local community to adopt an artist for the duration of the project and work with them to create an installation or artwork situated in their front yard or garden space. The Terrain Exhibitions Biennial first occurred in 2013 and will take place once more in 2015, expanding to include other artist run spaces in the Oak Park area.

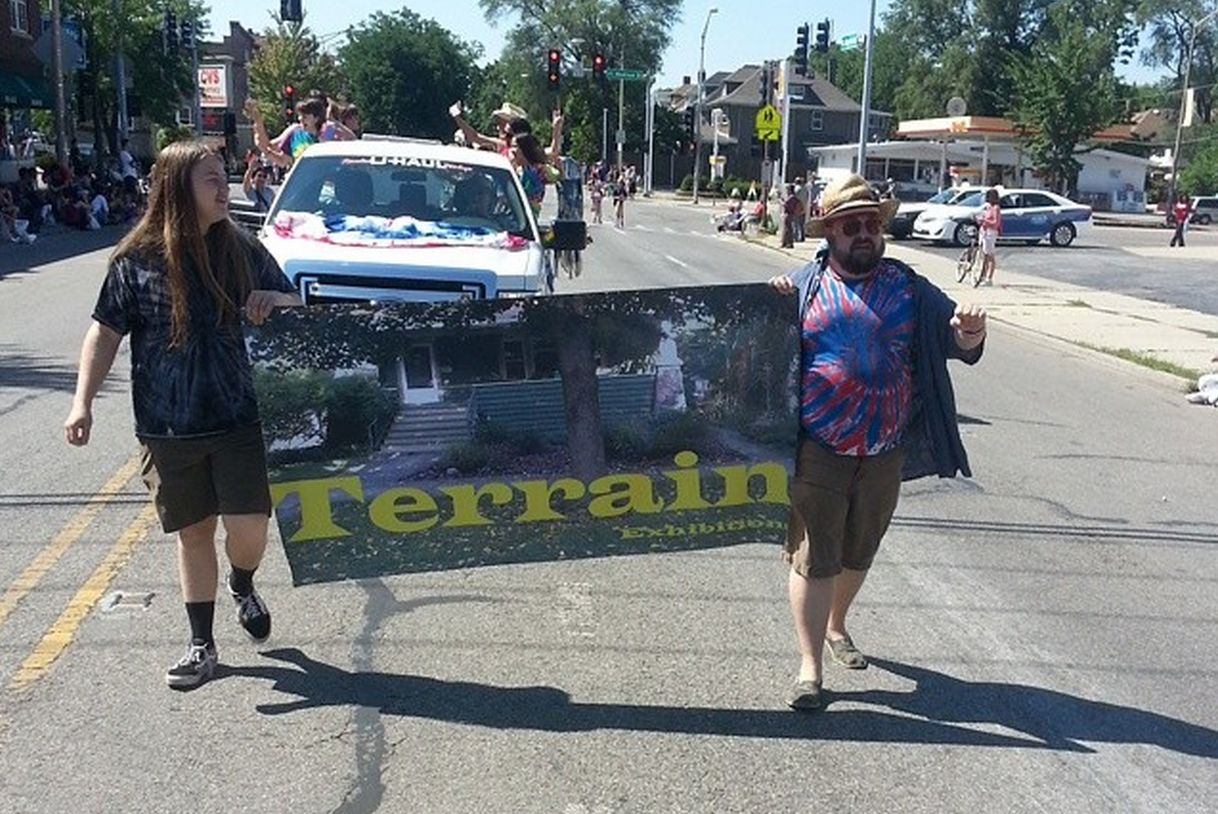
Terrain Exhibitions July 4th Parade with Lise Haller Baggesen

Terrain Exhibitions participated in the annual Oak Park July 4 parade on two occasions with Claire Ashley in 2012 and Lise Haller Baggesen in 2014.
