= Hogin =

Hogin is a surname. Notable people with the surname include:

- James Latimer Hogin (1801–1876), American politician from Iowa, father of John Chrisfield
- John Chrisfield Hogin (1823–1886), American politician from Iowa, son of James Latimer
- Laurie Hogin (born 1963), American artist
- Sam Hogin (1950–2004), American country songwriter

== See also ==
- Hogan (surname)
