= David Klamen =

American painter

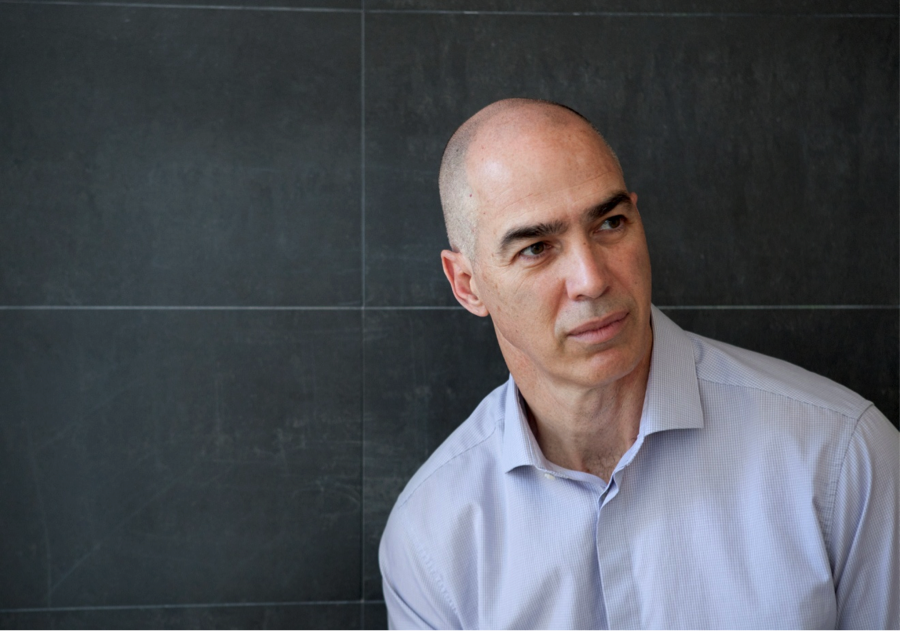
- Born: 1961 (age 64–65); Dixon, Illinois, US
- Education: School of the Art Institute of Chicago, University of Illinois Urbana-Champaign
- Known for: Painting, Drawing
- Style: Postmodern
- Website: davidklamen.com

David Klamen (born 1961) is an American artist and academic. He is known for visually diverse paintings that meld technical mastery with postmodern explorations of the processes by which humans understand and interpret experience. Klamen has exhibited across the United States, Europe and Asia, including individual shows at the Museum of Contemporary Art Chicago (MCA), the Chazen Museum of Art and the Cedar Rapids Museum of Art, and major group exhibitions at the Metropolitan Museum of Art, the Art Institute of Chicago, the Museum of Contemporary Art, San Diego, the Indianapolis Museum of Art, and the Crocker Art Museum. His work sits in the permanent collections of the Metropolitan Museum of Art, the Los Angeles Museum of Contemporary Art and the Whitney Museum of American Art, among others. Klamen has been based in Chicago for most of his career, which includes being an educator for over thirty years, primarily at Indiana University Northwest, where he was appointed Founding Dean, School of the Arts in 2018.

Klamen has produced multiple distinct, ongoing bodies of work—often shown in tandem—that range from academic realist-like representation to Op Art-like abstraction to warped re-paintings of art historical masterworks. Los Angeles Times critic David Pagel wrote that a Klamen exhibition could appear to be the work of as many as six distinct artists, yet display sharp focus and virtuoso painting across a constellation of styles, subjects and strategies. He called Klamen "a master of the double take," using ambiguity to create epistemological doubt and curiosity in viewers. Critics and curators, such as Kathryn Hixson, have noted in his work an "oscillating relationship" between romantic and logical, subjective and objective; as a result they have often described it as sensuous, nostalgic and wistful, or meditative, mystical and eerily calm, but also enigmatic and brooding, and uncanny and complex.

== Life and career ==
David Klamen, Untitled, oil on canvas, 90" x 70", 1993.

Klamen was born in 1961 in Dixon, Illinois, in the United States. He initially studied medical illustration at the University of Illinois, Urbana-Champaign (BFA, 1983), but switched to fine arts and abstract painting. He returned to representational work at the School of the Art Institute of Chicago (MFA, 1985), melding his regard for Minimalism, realist painting skills, and interests in hermeneutics and literature to develop a signature style: dark, highly varnished oil paintings of animals, landscapes and interiors, rendered with meticulous craftsmanship, such as Kings Knight (1986) or Untitled (1987, see right).

Klamen attracted art-world attention while still in school; he sold work, appeared in prestigious shows at the Indianapolis Museum of Art (1984) and Art Institute of Chicago (1985), and secured representation with the Marianne Deson Gallery in Chicago, where he later sold out his first two solo exhibitions. Soon after graduating, Klamen began teaching at Valparaiso University, and then at Indiana University Northwest, where he would serve for more than thirty years. In 1986, he was selected for the Museum of Contemporary Art Chicago's "A New Generation from SAIC" show, and found himself with a two-year waiting list for new paintings, each of which took up to two months to complete from his loft-studio space in Chicago's Pilsen neighborhood. In 1988, he retained European gallery representation with Galleria L'lsola in Rome and sold out his first exhibition on opening night.

Klamen has shown at Richard Gray Gallery (Chicago, and later New York) since 1991 and also at Haines Gallery (San Francisco) and Mark Moore Gallery (Los Angeles). Prominent group exhibitions featuring his work include: "Mind and Beast" (Leigh Yawkey Woodson Art Museum, 1993); "Unpainted to the Last," (works Influenced by Moby-Dick, Spencer Museum of Art, 1995–6); "Art in Chicago: 1945–1995" (MCA Chicago, 1996); and "(un)earthly delights" (Illinois State Museum, 1996). He has received reviews in numerous journals and U.S. and international newspapers.

Klamen is married to Dianne Lauble, Principal of Blue Fly Toy and a former director of design at Hasbro Toy Group. He has one daughter, Amelia Klamen, who studies medicine at Wayne State University School of Medicine.

== Work and reception ==
Klamen's art can be strikingly eclectic, ranging from miniature to monumental, realistic to abstract, and meditative to aggressive. It is unified conceptually, rather than visually, by his investigation of various historical methods of creating meaning, such as empiricism, memory, abstract or rationalized systems like mapping and digital coding, introspection, and Eastern enlightenment practices like chanting. Klamen brings together wide-ranging influences—Minimalist artists such as Donald Judd, Carl Andre and Walter De Maria, literary sources like Melville's Moby-Dick, and the semiotic theories of Charles Sanders Peirce. His work can be classified into five often-overlapping bodies: 1) Darkly varnished paintings; 2) Multi-canvas installations; 3) Watercolors; 4) "Stripe" paintings; and 5) "Meta-Paintings" and "Re-mixes."

David Klamen, Untitled, oil on canvas, 90" x 70", 1993.

=== Darkly varnished paintings ===
In 1985, Klamen began creating meticulous oil renderings of solitary, frozen animals (based on natural museum tableaux) and atmospheric, noir-ish landscapes based on memory, which he explored for their metaphorical qualities. He nearly obliterated these images with a layer of up to twenty coats of varnish, distancing them under an impenetrable, dark sepia-toned gloss, like insects in amber. This slowed disclosure of the work, as viewers had to allow their eyes to adjust to the hard-to-decipher images. He complicated the work by overlaying symbols, shapes or lines (often in stark white) on the varnished surface or by inexplicably leaving key areas unvarnished—and thus surreally illuminated—creating what critic Donald Kuspit called an "ominous, unresolved, uncanny contrast." In the early 1990s, Klamen introduced similarly haunting, austere images of architectural interiors—Victorian lobbies, halls and staircases in museums and universities, often featuring solitary, illuminated precious objects—with works such as in Untitled (1993, see left) that some critics felt were his most powerful to date.

Critical response was often positive and vexed. James Yood experienced the paintings as puzzles, whose layers of distancing devices and contrary pictorial languages obscured, undermined and expanded the work's potential. He and others identified a cluster of interpretive possibilities: a paean to an Old Masters tradition still relevant; a critical "embalming" of painting; and a postmodern deconstruction of cultural representations of nature, history, art and experience, as well as traditional pictorial strategies. Dissenting critics sometimes expressed an uneasiness with Klamen's technical skill. Ann Wiens likened the paintings to supermodels: mesmerizing in "their surface grace and beauty, their uncanny perfection," but "perhaps, too flawless." Alan Artner acknowledged Klamen's ability, but later questioned whether his varnishing and unorthodox additions weren't ways to imbue academic realism with mystery and postmodern significance.

David Klamen, Untitled (Daimoku Landscape), oil on canvas, 29" x 42", 2016.

Klamen introduced a related series in 1996: his "Daimoku" paintings, which overlapped illusionistic images of the Lake Michigan landscape with small, repetitive white dots, each an index or record of his touch and a symbol of one, repeated Buddhist meditative chant ("daimoku"). In some cases the dots form a grid or pattern over the landscape, as in Untitled (Daimoku Landscape) (2016); in others, they nearly obscure it, leaving two images to occupy the picture plane. Klamen sought to make this work "teeter on the edge" of various pictorial languages, in this case, Peirce's semiotic modes (iconic, indexical and symbolic) of representation, while also investigating painting as a process of enlightenment or self-knowledge, akin to meditation. In 2002, Klamen also extended his vocabulary, creating dark landscape drawings, made by erasing into a sheet completely covered in graphite.

=== Multi-canvas Installations ===
In 1996, Klamen began to exhibit salon-style, multi-canvas installations of two-dozen or more eclectic paintings that explored taxonomy as a method, while providing a new mode of expression through the intertextuality of the canvasses. The individual paintings—often heavily scraped, sanded or repainted, with language fragments, indecipherable diagrams, thick smears of paint, or realistically rendered objects—were based on small, private memories, incidents or impressions that Klamen felt weren't fully formed enough to stand as individual artworks. He found that in concert they revealed surprises and formed wholes that David Pagel described as "multi-faceted, intimate panorama," in which reverie, intuition and dreaminess took precedence over rationality. Others critics observed that the installations revealed a playful side previously unseen in Klamen's work.

=== Watercolors ===
Klamen's watercolor paintings (1997– ) combined the salon-style format with his semiotic interests, examining the iconic representation of (most notably) landscape and the indexical recording of both his action and the bleeding of his materials. Taking advantage of the spontaneous flow of paint and ink with a wet-on-wet process, he created several dozen Rorschach test-like, postage-sized paintings, each with two or three strokes or a single drop, arranged salon-style on a single sheet. The tiny paintings read as believable landscapes and sunsets, evoking Klamen's deeply internalized memories of Midwestern lakes, skies, and trees, while also revealing how repetition, habit and the codes and conventions of landscape painting and ideas of nature can shape a viewer's experience.

David Klamen, Learning Nature 2, acrylic on canvas, 96" x 204", 1998.

=== "Stripe" paintings ===
In the "Stripe" acrylic paintings (1998– ), Klamen employed an optical strategy on par with the perceptual challenges of his varnished paintings, but in an almost diametrically opposed visual language. He fused two modes of visual coding—modernist Op Art and color-field painting with bar codes—in a system of high-contrast, pulsating yellow and black stripes (actually scannable for the paintings' titles). The stripes obscure recognizable 18th-century masterpieces, tourist vistas, and pornographic photos within them, creating works that oscillate between abstraction and representation as well as clashing cultural cues, such as Learning Nature 2 (1998, exhibited at the MCA Chicago, which reproduces Frederic Church's Niagara). Critics divided on them. Ann Weins found them consistent with Klamen's past work in their dueling visual strategies and layered commentary on history, artistic tradition, and visual obstruction. Margaret Hawkins called the work "a shocker," noting Klamen's slowing of disclosure to reveal the images' form, but mourned the "loss in beauty."

=== "Meta-Paintings" & "Re-mixes" ===
David Klamen, Untitled (Meta-Painting Multi-canvas installation), oil on 24 separate canvasses, 90.25" x 145", 2015.

Klamen's "Meta Paintings" and "Re-mixes" (2009– ) feature paintings within paintings: carefully rendered "re-processings" of art-canon masterworks, depicted on exhibition walls (information tags included), often at oblique angles or in radically distorted form. The "Meta Paintings" take liberties with color, scale, value range and composition, for example, using vantage point to impose diagonals on the flat horizontal and vertical harmonies of a Mondrian to problematize its absolutist purity of form, or obscuring Velázquez or Rembrandt images under layers of varnish that flatten them into dark, inky rectangles in gilded frames. The works are further complicated by the juxtaposition of illusionary shadows on the painted wall with real shadows, and by the multiple planes of illusionary and real space. In the "Re-mixes," Klamen warped well-known works by Monet, Picasso, Sargent and others, transforming them into jarring images that suggest liquefaction, visually, and art history in a state of flux, conceptually. Klamen created both individual paintings and multi-canvas installations in this series. Untitled (Meta-Painting Multi-canvas installation), 2015, see right) is composed of 24 meta-paintings of masterworks prominently featuring blue that create what critic Lisa Wainwright called a "semiotic still life study" of disparate worldviews, aesthetics, and spatial illusions. She and other critics observed that the series both adulates and questions the signification of painting, engaging viewers with humor, while foregrounding context and perspective with regard to authority, authenticity, market value and intertextual associations.

== Academic career ==
Klamen has worked in academia for more than thirty years, teaching painting, drawing, fundamental studio and art theory, and serving in various administrative capacities. He began as an adjunct professor at Valparaiso University in 1985, before accepting a tenure-track assistant professor position that fall at Indiana University Northwest (IUN). In subsequent years, he was appointed Associate Professor (1992), Professor (1996), and Professor of the University Graduate School, Indiana University (1998). In 2012, the university named him Chancellor's Professor, and he earned membership in Indiana University's Alliance of Distinguished and Titled Professors. He also served as Associate Dean in the College of Arts and Sciences and Chair, Department of Fine Arts. In 2016, the University of Massachusetts Dartmouth appointed him Dean, College of Visual and Performing Arts and Professor of Fine Arts, and looked to him to reverse a longstanding trend of declining admissions in the school. The pattern was turned around over a period of two years, with freshman enrollment and transfers rising by 58% and 22%, respectively, and new programs and the introduction of Social Practice art expanding the school's offerings. In 2018, Klamen returned to Indiana University Northwest and was appointed Founding Dean, School of the Arts.

Klamen has frequently lectured on topics including art fairs, beauty, art collecting, the history of art galleries in Chicago, and his own work, among others, at venues including the School of the Art Institute of Chicago, the Chicago Humanities Festival, Art Chicago, MCA Chicago, and numerous universities.

== Collections ==
Klamen's works are in numerous permanent public collections, including those of the Los Angeles Museum of Contemporary Art, Metropolitan Museum of Art, Fine Arts Museums of San Francisco, Chazen Museum of Art, Whitney Museum of American Art, Museum of Contemporary Art Chicago, San Francisco Museum of Modern Art, Krannert Art Museum, Illinois State Museum, National Museum of Contemporary Art, Seoul, Korea, Crocker Art Museum, McNay Art Museum, and City of Chicago, among others.
