= Alison Ruttan =

American interdisciplinary artist

- Born: 1954 (age 71–72); Knoxville, Tennessee, US
- Education: School of the Art Institute of Chicago, University of Michigan
- Known for: Installation art, Sculpture, Photography, Video
- Style: Interdisciplinary, Political art, Materiality, Feminist
- Spouse: Scott Stack
- Website: Alison Ruttan

Alison Ruttan, Line in The Sand/Highway of Death, Installation view, cast ceramic vehicles, wood, sand, brick, plastic bags, 12' x 32', 2013–4.

Alison Ruttan (born 1954) is an American interdisciplinary artist whose work investigates human behaviors such as appetite, sexuality and aggression and the degree to which they are governed by biology or social conditioning. She has explored diverse media from animation to photography to installation and drawn on fields from primatology to social theory, creating work that ranges from light-hearted gender critique to sobering meditation on war. Ruttan has exhibited individually at the Chicago Cultural Center, Hyde Park Art Center, Three Arts Club of Chicago and Monique Meloche Gallery, and in group shows at the Museum of Contemporary Photography, The Drawing Center, Crystal Bridges Museum of American Art, Apexart and Minneapolis Institute of Art, among many venues. She has also shown internationally at Directors Lounge (Berlin) and in Canada, the Netherlands, Russia, Spain and the United Kingdom. Her work has been discussed in journals such as Art in America, Flash Art, Art Papers, Sculpture, and New Art Examiner, as well as in major newspapers, magazines, and television and radio outlets. In addition to her art career, Ruttan has taught at several Chicago institutions, most notably the School of the Art Institute of Chicago. She has been based in Chicago with her husband, artist Scott Stack, since 1990.

== Life and career ==
Ruttan was born in Knoxville, Tennessee in 1954, but grew up in several places, including Washington D.C., California, and the Philippines, among many. After completing high school in the Twin Cities, Minnesota-area, Ruttan studied photography at the University of Michigan (BFA, 1976), training that continues to inform her aesthetic. After graduation, she returned to Minneapolis, shifted to painting that mixed figuration and abstraction, and married Scott Stack in 1980. In 1982, their daughter Natalie was born and they moved to Williamsburg, Brooklyn, where they lived until 1990.

In 1990, Ruttan enrolled in the graduate program at the School of the Art Institute of Chicago (SAIC) to study painting. While there, she began creating body-related installations, influenced by work in the school's fiber department, which included Anne Wilson and emphasized conceptualism and materiality. After graduating (MFA, 1992), Ruttan began teaching (Columbia College Chicago, 1993; SAIC, 1994–2001) and gaining notice for conceptual sculpture that she exhibited in Chicago alternative venues, as well as in New York, Minneapolis, and across the Midwest. In the 2000s, she exhibited regularly at the Monique Meloche Gallery in Chicago, taught at the University of Chicago (2001–6), and pursued her interest in primatology with an artist residency observing bonobos at the Wild Animal Park in San Diego (2005). In 2006, she returned to SAIC, where she teaches in the Contemporary Practices department. In recent years, Ruttan has exhibited in numerous universities and arts institutions, including the Chicago Cultural Center, Ukrainian Institute of Modern Art, and Elmhurst Museum.

== Work and reception ==
Unlike most artists, Ruttan's work is unified by its topical focus on understanding human behavior rather than by medium or style. Her inquiries lead her to diverse disciplines (primatology, evolutionary biology, feminism, political science, history) and often-new media that she chooses to best physically manifest the narrative she is structuring. Ruttan describes her process as research-based, immersive and non-hierarchical; her intent is to evoke a viewer's own relationship to a subject rather than elicit a specific response. Her practice can be divided into two thematic categories involving human drives, each with distinct bodies of work: 1) Inquiries into food and sex; and 2) Inquiries into aggression and war.

Alison Ruttan, bippity Bop, digitally created video animation (stills), 2000.

=== Inquiries into sex and appetite ===
Ruttan's early work explored appetite and desire and their relationship to social norms and excess, employing various media. Critic Susan Snodgrass wrote that her "diverse oeuvre" playfully questioned "the entangled relationship of sexuality, consumption, censorship and taboo." Alan Artner, however, encountered "a plethora of good ideas" whose connection he found elusive. Ruttan first gained widespread attention for her "Dough Girls" (1994–5): bread dough sculptures cast from a mold of a women's bottom and baked in pairs of women's underwear; critics noted in them an amusing, uneasy mingling of "wholesome and abject" associations. In works from her "Food" series (1996–98), such as Sweet Potatoe Pie, Ruttan appropriated pornographic images and then strategically obscured them with circular "cut-outs" of gourmet food magazines, creating tantalizing compositions that denied easy comprehension and satisfaction of either drive. Her "Colors" series (1997) employed a similar approach using candy colored, Hans Arp-like silhouettes that created a disorienting, high/low collision of cartoon, abstract art and porn aesthetics.

Ruttan extended this work with the droll looped animations bippity Bop and bob bob (2000), which were partly inspired by biological research positing gender-defined, "hardwired" human responses. She stripped pornographic videos down to flat, pulsating, non-explicit biomorphic shapes, then carefully tracked their movement to retain the rhythms and shapes of sex in order to trigger dawning recognition in viewers. The double projection Chromophilia (2001) likewise featured bright, pulsing abstract shapes that resembled paper-doll cutouts or Matisse dancers. The shapes flickered in and out of recognizable sexual activity—scored to excerpts from The Nutcracker—creating an effect that critic Margaret Hawkins described as "Fantasia meets Fritz the Cat". Others deemed it a clever upending of assumptions about animation, pornography and elite art that deflated the charged cultural and legal discourse around pornography, returning to its basic, sometimes clumsy, originating act.

With her three-channel video Installation Love Me Not (2001), Ruttan considered the concealed intentions in intimate physical expression. She captured three different couples tickling one another to exhaustion, heightening the emotional charge as they traded roles of aggressor and victim by shooting close with an encircling camera and manipulating the playback speed.

Alison Ruttan, "The Four Year War at Gombe": Honey Bee Watches the End Come for Willy Wally, nine photographs, Museum of Contemporary Photography installation, 2012.

=== Inquiries into aggression and war ===
After 9/11, Ruttan's interest shifted to questions about human aggression and rationality, often in comparison to animals. The video work Impersonator (2005) explores George Lakoff and Mark Johnson's notion that human reason is shaped by the specifics of human bodies, and thus, on a continuum with animals rather than separate from them. Facing videos show a cat pacing the perimeter of a room and a man mimicking the cat; the disparity between the innateness of the cat's actions and the man's mimicry reinforces how embodied behavior is. The video Lapse (2005) projects a large, slow-motion close-up of a man's face as he bursts in rage and then calms in cognition of the act, foregrounding the dislocation between the two emotional states.

==== Primate works ====
In 2004, Ruttan became interested in evolutionary biology and primates—humanity's nearest biological relatives—as a means of understanding humans. Her mixed-media drawings, Individuation in Bonobo Grooming Habits (2006), documented her discovery (in three different communities) that bonobos in captivity express themselves through distinct, individual "hair styles." The series slyly compares species, while entertaining the idea that habits of individuation and self-adornment might represent, like toolmaking, legitimate intelligent behavior involving socialization. "Fringe Dwellers" (2007) stemmed from bonobos' endangered species status; Ruttan photographed them in human spaces, imagining them as an immigrant group struggling to integrate into human culture. Her "Bred in the Bone" works (2008) paired videos and photographs of primate social interactions that she shot at Wild Animal Park with like images of people in order to problematize assumptions of human rationality.

Ruttan's research eventually took her to the work of primatologist Jane Goodall. She was fascinated by the account of an unexplained, deadly civil war within a once-peaceable chimpanzee troupe, seeing in it an "origin story" of humanity's own history of warfare. Ruttan's inquiry and previous work led to the epic series, The Four Year War at Gombe (2009–12), seventy-five photographs and three videos in which she choreographed and filmed a reenactment of the primate war using family, friends and neighbors. The series contrasts pastoral scenes of the intact community that she modeled after Corot plein air paintings and images of 1960s American communal life with tableau of the murders (e.g., the installation, Honey Bee Watches the End Come for Willy Wally) which reference films such as Deliverance, West Side Story and Lord of the Flies. Art historian Lisa Wainwright described it as "wonderfully bizarre—primitivism gone amuck in a richly verdant setting." Interpretations varied; many critics saw a dark, Biblical or Shakespearean meditation on humanity's perhaps genetic propensity for violence, tribalism and instinctive action. Others detected subtle hope in the disjuncture between the human reenactment and the original primate behaviors. Michael Weinstein wrote that the series evoked "a mixture of humor, absurdity, depression, truth and self-recognition."

Alison Ruttan, All Down the Line, Sculpture, ceramic, 2016–7.

==== Ceramic works on war ====
Ruttan returned to human affairs in 2011 to consider war and its effects on communities. Inspired by Han Dynasty funerary models, she chose to work in ceramics for its physicality, intimacy, and ability to break through the desensitization of media images to facilitate empathy. Her series, "A Bad Idea Seems Good Again" (2011–6), consists of approximately 30 small-scale, ceramic maquettes of devastated buildings based on photographs of war-torn Beirut. (The "Dark City" series of 2016–7 focused on destruction in Aleppo and Homs, Syria.) Critics and curators described them, variously, as uncanny, disorienting, "eerily beautiful, and graphic in their depiction," noting how Ruttan's material and formal choices complicated the work's reception. In a jarring mix of aesthetics, memorial and documentation, the sculptures juxtapose familiar International Style architectural grids and objet d'art scale and beauty against the reality of rubble, collapse and (undepicted) death. Ruttan's decisions to leave some of the buildings intact on one side—thus portraying the transition and path from whole to collapse—and to place others on low tables organized like city-block grids had a similar effect, positioning viewers to embody time and destruction as they moved around the work. Critics linked the uncomfortable, God's-eye view to a distanced, perhaps American perspective, interpreting the works overall as a reflection on the failures of modernism, reason, and basic empathy.

For Line in The Sand/Highway of Death (2013–4), Ruttan created a 30-foot by 12-foot diorama of more than 600 ceramic pieces and sand. The installation depicted the aftermath of a 1991 U.S.-Canadian bombing raid on a 60-mile stretch of highway between Kuwait and Basra, which killed hundreds of retreating Iraqi military and civilians. Set low to the ground in a Chicago Cultural Center exhibition (2015), it recreated for visitors a bird's eye view chillingly akin to that of the bombing pilots. Lisa Wainwright described the piece's "horrific gestalt" as an "instance of the sublime," alternating between pleasure and horror, seduction and repulsion, and aesthetics and politics.

In her "An Unmaking" works (2018), Ruttan has sought to close the gap between her damaged architectural forms and domestic life, as well as between the sites of carnage and American viewers. The series integrates rubble and shattered buildings in sculptures of typical, middle-class, Middle Eastern furnishings such as chairs, coffee tables, and dressers. The Weinberg/Newton Gallery in Chicago paired this work with the nonprofit educational organization Facing History and Ourselves for a two-month event series and exhibition called "Weight of the World" in 2018.

== Recognition ==
Ruttan has been recognized with artist residencies at Wild Animal Park (Escondido, California, 2005) and Krems, Austria (2015), and an Art & Technology Residency at Wexner Center for the Arts (2004). She has received awards from the Illinois Arts Council (1993, 1996, 2002), School of the Art Institute of Chicago (1997, 2000), Jerome Foundation (1981–2), and Minnesota State Arts Board (1980). Her work is in several public collections, including the Crystal Bridges Museum of American Arts, Museum of Contemporary Photography, Daniel Levinas Collection, Minneapolis Institute of Art, Gamson Art Collection, and University of California, Riverside.
