= Vince Carducci =

American journalist

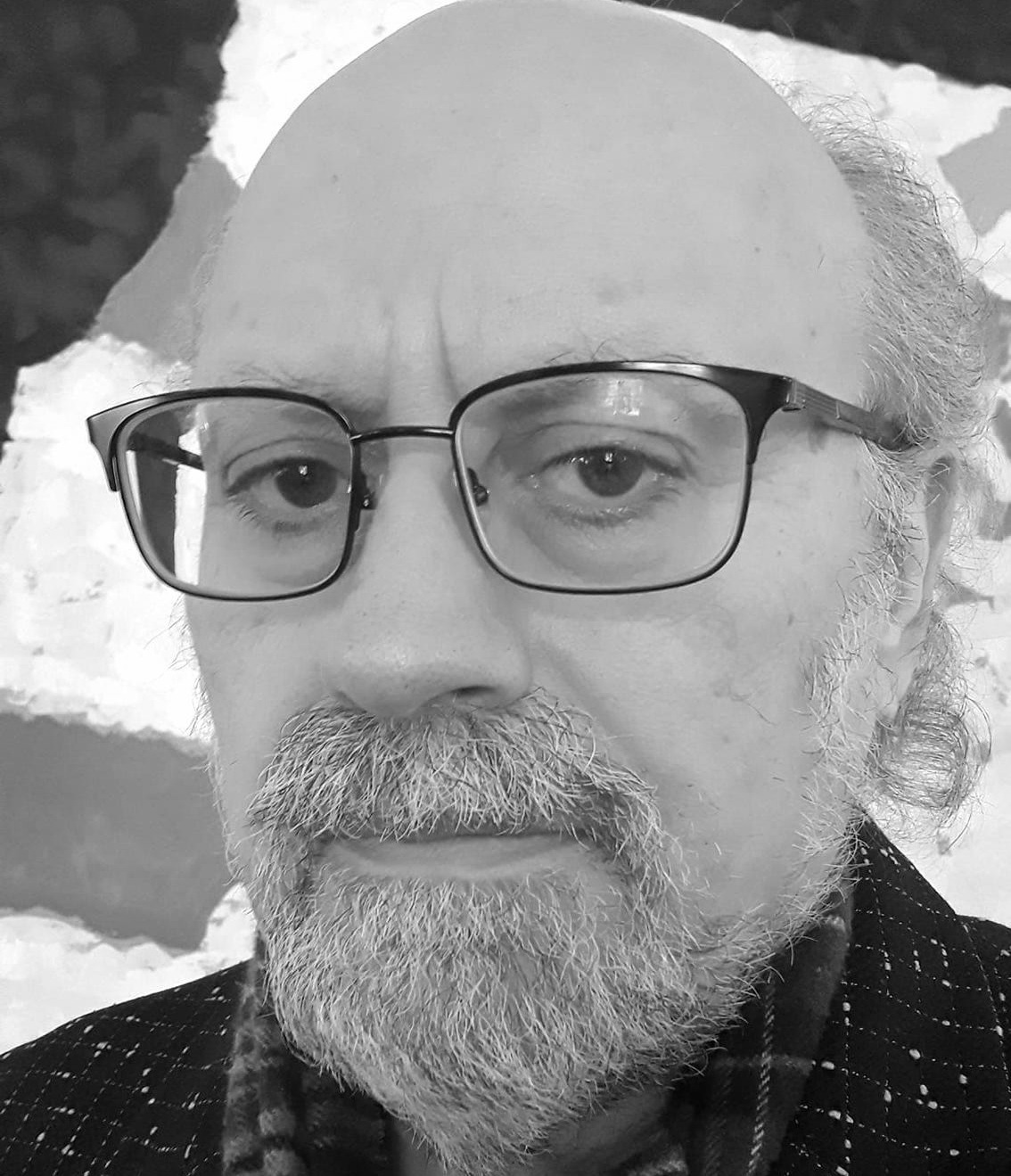

Vince Carducci is a cultural critic and dean emeritus at College for Creative Studies. His essays, feature articles and reviews on the arts, culture and other topics have appeared in numerous publications since the mid-1980s, including Art and Australia, Art in America, BrandChannel.com, the Journal of Consumer Culture, Logos, Public Seminar and Sculpture magazine.

He was the Detroit correspondent for Artforum, contributing editor and Michigan editor for New Art Examiner and editor of Detroit Focus Quarterly. He has also been a contributing writer for Metro Times in Detroit, and a staff writer for PopMatters, a webzine of global culture.

He was also senior vice president and director of marketing and corporate communications for Standard Federal Bank, now part of Bank of America.

From 2012 to 2020, he served as dean of undergraduate studies at College for Creative Studies in Detroit. He has also taught at Oakland University, University of Michigan and Wayne State University. In 2008, he coordinated the Critical Studies/Humanities program at Cranbrook Academy of Art. In 2010, he received a Kresge Arts in Detroit Literary Fellowship, awarded by the Kresge Foundation, for his art criticism.

From the 1980s to the early 2000s, Carducci was active as a practicing artist, whose work is contained in numerous private collections, as well as in the Gilbert and Lila Silverman Fluxus Collection Archives in the Museum of Modern Art Archives in New York City.

Carducci has a bachelor's degree from Michigan State University and a master's and PhD degrees from the New School for Social Research in New York City. He was born in Detroit in 1953.

== Selected works ==
Carducci has written several journal articles, some of which are listed below.

- Carducci, Vince (2017). "Detroit: The Dream Is Now: The Design, Art, and Resurgence of an American City by Michel Arnaud (review)". Michigan Historical Review. 43 (2): 81–82. doi:10.1353/mhr.2017.0053. Project MUSE 779243.
- Carducci, Vince (2015). "Warhol, Andy". The Wiley Blackwell Encyclopedia of Consumption and Consumer Studies. pp. 561–563. doi:10.1002/9781118989463.wbeccs237. ISBN 978-1-118-98946-3.
- Carducci, Vince (2015). The Art of the Common: Envisioning Real Utopias in Postindustrial Detroit (Thesis). OCLC 935925869.
- Carducci, Vince (November 2009). "Book Review: Jo Littler, Radical Consumption: Shopping for Change in Contemporary Culture. Maidenhead: Open University Press, 2008. 160 pp. ISBN-13 978—0—3352—2152—3/ISBN-10 0—3352—2152—1 (pbk)". Journal of Consumer Culture. 9 (3): 422–424. doi:10.1177/14695405090090030301. S2CID 144272094.
- Carducci, Vince (March 2006). "Culture Jamming: A Sociological Perspective". Journal of Consumer Culture. 6 (1): 116–138. doi:10.1177/1469540506062722. S2CID 145164048.
- Carducci, Vince (2005). "Confidence Games on Canal Street: The Market for Knockoffs in New York City". Consumers, Commodities, & Consumption. 6 (2).
