= Laurie Hogin =

American painter

- Born: 1963 (age 62–63); Chicago, Illinois, US
- Education: School of the Art Institute of Chicago, Cornell University
- Known for: Painting, drawing, education
- Spouse: Greg Boozell
- Website: Laurie Hogin

Laurie Hogin (born 1963) is an American artist, known for allegorical paintings of mutant animals and plants that rework the tropes and exacting styles of Neoclassical art in order to critique, parody or call attention to contemporary and historical mythologies, systems of power, and human experience and variety. She has exhibited nationally and internationally, including at the Museum of Contemporary Art Chicago, International Print Center New York, and Contemporary Arts Center Cincinnati. Her work belongs to the art collections of the New York Public Library, MacArthur Foundation, Addison Gallery of American Art, and Illinois State Museum, among others. Critic Donald Kuspit described her work as both painted with "a deceptive, crafty beauty" and "sardonically aggressive" in its use of animal stand-ins to critique humanity; Ann Wiens characterized her "roiling compositions of barely controlled flora and fauna" as "shrewdly employing art historical concepts of beauty for their subversive potential." Hogin is Professor and Chair of the Studio Art Program at the University of Illinois at Urbana–Champaign.

Laurie Hogin, Pinup Bunnies (Bunny Suite #1): Tomato, oil on panel, 19" x 23", 1994.

== Life and career ==
Laurie Hogin was born in Chicago, Illinois in 1963. She grew up in Cos Cob, Connecticut, drawn to nearby woods, natural history dioramas, and by high school, environmental activism. She studied art and cultural anthropology at Cornell University (BFA, 1985), before enrolling at the School of the Art Institute of Chicago in 1986 (MFA, 1989). In her final year there, she painted her first animal painting, making connections between an encyclopedia image of rabbits, Playboy bunnies and cultural depictions of women, which set the stage for what would be her signature work.

Soon after graduating, Hogin began showing at the Peter Miller Gallery (Chicago, 1989–2015) and in exhibitions at the Art Institute of Chicago, the New Museum, Portland Art Museum, Chicago Cultural Center and Illinois State Museum, all between 1990–6. After her first solo show at Peter Miler (1990), others soon followed at the Mint Museum (1992), Kohler Arts Center (1993), and Littlejohn Contemporary (New York); she has also shown regularly at Koplin Del Rio (Los Angeles/Seattle, 1999– ), Schroeder Romero (New York, 2003–11), Tory Folliard (Milwaukee, 2004– ), and Opus Art (Newcastle, 2007–15). Career surveys have been held at the Evanston Art Center (1997) and Cedar Rapids Museum of Art (2007). Hogin joined the faculty of the School of Art and Design at the University of Illinois at Urbana–Champaign in 1997, where she has served as Professor, Chair of the Painting and Sculpture Program (2012–7), and Chair of the Studio Art Program (2017– ). Hogin's work has been reviewed in Artforum, Art in America, Juxtapoz, Arts Magazine, New Art Examiner, the Los Angeles Times, and Chicago Tribune, among other publications. Her artwork has also been published in Harper's Magazine (several issues), The Stranger, The Bear Deluxe, and Lapham's Quarterly, among others. Hogin is based in rural east-central Illinois, where she lives with her husband, photographer and filmmaker Greg Boozell, and son.

== Work and reception ==
Laurie Hogin, Riches from the Four Great Rivers, oil on canvas, 57" x 81", 1995.

Hogin's work employs techniques, vocabularies, and visual codes from the history of painting and visual culture: 17th-century Dutch "embarrassment of riches" still lifes, naturalistic, 18th-century English landscapes, Baroque portraiture, French Romantic historical tableaux, natural displays, and more. She uses them to create mordant, diorama-like scenes that critique, parody and sometimes propose alternatives to contemporary cultural and social issues or celebrate aspects of human experience. She upends these genres with lushly painted, thoroughly researched canvases whose elaborate visual conceits feature surreal, mutated animal protagonists (e.g., snarling rabbits with tiger skins, screeching monkeys, or albino alligators) chosen for their allegorical associations and overgrown, toxic landscapes. Critics, such as Susan Snodgrass, suggest that Hogin employs a "bait-and-switch" tactic, luring viewers with virtuoso technique and then inserting subversive, often harsh cultural criticism, conveyed through her fantastic, anthropomorphized creatures, pointed allegories, and ironic text and decorative artifice. Writer Maureen Sherlock aligns Hogin's wry approach with satire, caricature, and the Surrealist and Enlightenment projects of unmasking ideologies and codes of representation.

Laurie Hogin, Monkey Brains – The Bubble, oil on panel, 22" x 22", 2008.

In early paintings, Hogin reworked conventions of Romantic allegorical painting that imbued animals and nature with symbols of tranquility, innocence and harmony with humanity, substituting insolent beasts that critic Kathryn Hixson suggested sat in defiance of a sentimentality that often served as cover for industrial-age exploitation. Monumental works such as Posse and War (both 1991) depicted snarling, scowling and grinning menageries arranged in historical or heroic tableaux whose compositions derived from works by artists such as Gainsborough or Copley. Hogin surrounded these narrative canvases with ironic, handcrafted frames of wood veneer and gold leaf, cursive inscriptions quoting romantic, period paeans to the land, and lists of chemical pollutants. Art in America described the work as "paradoxically monstrous and beautiful"; James Yood wrote: "The ecological havoc Hogin postulates […] is a lush and fecund one; her animals are compendia of sorts, ultracreatures with an almost sickening beauty" presented "in a quasi-documentary style."

Hogin shifted to a broader spectrum of political themes in the mid-1990s, which included imperialism, the representation of women, patriotism, and consumerism. In Riches from the Four Great Rivers of the Earth (1995) she replaced Rubens's nymphs with mutant beasts; her series of smaller works, "Pinup Bunnies" (1994) parodied compositions by Manet, the distorted odalisques of Ingres, and Playboy magazine poses in portraits of pink bunnies inscribed with derogatory female pet names, such as 'tomato' or 'cupcake.' Her "Allegories of Brand Loyalty" series (1995) questioned current-day marketing and the commodification of private life with updates of the Flemish vanitas—which historically represented the futility of pleasure and wealth and the transience of life—featuring snarling monkeys (longtime symbols of lust, folly, vanity and blind imitation) and inscriptions of corporate brands, such as Nike, Elle, and ABC News.

Laurie Hogin, Diorama with Psychodynamic Species, oil on canvas, 36" x 48", 2010.

In the 2000s, Hogin frequently focused on the interplay between human drives, evolutionary biology and consumerism, in work that increasingly adopted the synthetic, Day-Glo palette of children's toys and cartoons, psychedelia and global marketing. The series "Allegory of Psychodemographics: 24 Branded Products My Family Uses on a Typical Summer Day" (2006) examined consumer goods from Ambien to toothpaste, as did the later "Sugar Trilogy"; two solo shows in New York ("Neuromantic Evening, Psychotropical Paradise" and "Monkey Brains," both 2008) commented on the effects of psychopharmacology in contemporary life with depictions of gun-toting, dazed monkeys, fluorescent reptiles, and an installation of 100 portraits of mutant guinea pigs with rabid features and radioactive coats, called What Ails Us: The 100 Most-Prescribed Pharmaceuticals in the Nation. In 2017, James Yood wrote of the over-saturated, apocalyptic parables in her show, "Implacable Demons and Better Angels" (e.g., Portrait of a Startled Rabbit Near a Culvert, 2016), "Hogin sees everywhere a comely corruption, an animal kingdom so giddy in its savagery and evil that only the trappings of an overcharged and hothouse beauty could describe it."

Although Hogin is most known for painting, she has created sculptural and fabric works, as well as drawings and prints.

=== Writing ===
Hogin's published writings include fiction, critical reviews and essays, and chapters in the publications Painters on Painting, The Figure (2014), Living and Sustaining a Creative Life (2013), and The Artists' and Writers' Cookbook (2016), among others.
