= Lisa Wainwright =

American art historian (born 1960)

- Born: September 1960 (age 65–66); Miami, Florida, U.S.
- Education: University of Illinois (1993)

Lisa Wainwright (born September 1960) is an American art historian at the School of the Art Institute of Chicago. She previously served SAIC as the Dean of Faculty and Vice President of Academic Affairs, as well as Title IX officer for faculty. Wainwright received a Ph.D. in the history of 19th and 20th-century art, University of Illinois, 1993; an M.A. in history of 19th and 20th-century art, University of Illinois, December 1986, and a B.A. cum laude, Vanderbilt University, art history, June 1982. She also studied at the Goethe-Institut in Blaubeuren, Germany, in summer 1982.

== Research ==
Wainwright's historical research is focused on Robert Rauschenberg. Her dissertation, Reading Junk: Thematic Imagery in the Art of Robert Rauschenberg from 1954 to 1964, is cited in the Rauschenberg Research Project, San Francisco Museum of Modern Art and in the book The Great Migrator: Robert Rauschenberg and the Global Rise of American Art, by Hiroko Ikegami, MIT Press, 2010. She states that her study of Rauschenberg has influenced her work at SAIC. "Rauschenberg has helped me be a better dean," she explains. "He touched on every medium, from sculpture and painting to printmaking and art technology. His transdisciplinary approach to art has been such an influence on the way I educate the next generation of artists here." Wainwright was invited to discuss Rauschenberg's life and legacy on Bad At Sports, EPISODE 144.

Currently, she works as the Title IX officer for SAIC for faculty.

== Publications ==
- Artist Profile: Alison Ruttan, Art Ltd. Magazine, May 2015.
- The Enduring Appeal of Ed Paschke, Art Ltd. Magazine, September 2014.
- Dialogue: Michelle Grabner, Art Ltd. Magazine, Spring 2014.
- Theaster Gates: Exercises in the Creation of Value, Art Ltd. Magazine, Winter 2013.
- Phyllis Bramson, WCA Awards catalog essay, Fall 2013.
- Dimensional Lines: Art and Fashion Catalog, Introduction, Evanston Art Center, Fall 2011.
- Encyclopædia Britannica Online, revisions to twenty-nine essays published in 2003, 2011.
- Painting Paintings, catalogue essay for David Klamen exhibition, Richard Gray Gallery, New York, 2009.
- Post-Modern-Vice, catalogue essay for Sarah Krepp exhibition, Roy Boyd Gallery, Chicago, 2009.
- Rabid Methods, catalogue essay for Barbara Kendrick exhibition, I space Gallery, University of Illinois, 2009.
- Practicing Rauschenberg, Experience Into Art, essay, University of California Press, 2009.
- Susanna Coffey's War Pictures, Susanna Coffey Since 2001, Exhibition Catalogue, Essay, New York Studio School of Drawing, Painting & Sculpture, 2008.
- The New Gotham: Decadent Art in Chicago, exhibition catalogue essay, School of the, Art Institute of Chicago, 2008.
- Figurative Fuges: The Artistry of David Tepilca, Intimate Decades, catalogue essay, Diane Tanios Gallery, Chicago, 2008.
- Cosmic Hostess, catalogue essay for Gescheidle Gallery, 2006.
- Things of Nature and the Nature of Things: John Wilde, Chazen Museum of Art, University of Wisconsin, 2006.
- About the Female Gaze, Rosalind Al-Aswad: Portraits of an Examined Life, Catalogue Essay, Gallery 2, Chicago, 2005.
- Valerie Beller, catalogue essay for Jean Albano Gallery, 2005.
- Raymond Pettibon's High/Low High Jinx, A History of the Renaissance Society: 1990-2000, The Renaissance Society, Hyde Park, Illinois, 2005.
- Lorraine Peltz, Dream/Girl, catalogue essay for Gescheidle Gallery, 2004.
- Diana's Cowboys, catalogue essay for Diana Guerrera-Macià, 2004.
- The Art of Stephen Lapthisophon, catalogue essay, Gallery 400, University of Illinois, 2002.
- Encyclopædia Britannica, twenty-nine essays including Richard Serra, Robert Smithson, Bill Viola, Damien Hirst, Edward Ruscha, David Salle, Dan Flavin, Felix Gonzalez-Torres, Gerhard Richter, Jeff Koons, Julian Schnabel, James Rosenquist, Yves Klein, and others, 2003.
- The Shuey Collection, Catalogue Entries, Cranbrook Museum of Art, Cranbrook, Michigan, 2001.
- Jose Cobo: de dos en dos, Catalog Essay, Palacete del Embarcadero, Cantabria, Spain, 2001.
- Rauschenberg's Odalisqa, El Cultural, Madrid, 2001.
- Excellent Hostess, Gallery Catalog for I-Space, Chicago, 2000.
- Postcard from Amsterdam, New Art Examiner, February, 2000.
- Barbara Kendrick's Flights of Fancy, Espace Huit Novembre, Paris, Exhibition Catalogue, Fall, 1988.
- David Michael Porritt, Exhibition Essay, I-Space, University of Illinois at Champaign-Urbana, 1998.
- Kate Schutta: Collage Collections, Exhibition Catalogue, 1998.
- Rauschenberg's American Voodoo, New Art Examiner, 1998.
- Anne Wilson's Taxonomy of Memories, Fiberarts, September/October, 1997.
- "Pink", Catalogue Essay, Jean Albano Gallery, Chicago (April 21-March 26, 1997).
- "The Quiet Dramas of Lorraine Peltz," Le Petit Canard, no. 5 (Sepembre-Octobre-Novembre 1996).
- "From Norman Bates to Annette Messager: Taxidermy for a Reason", New Art Examiner, (May 1996).
- Review of "Liberty", Art Papers, (January/February 1996).
- "Robert Rauschenberg's Fabrics: Constructing Domestic Space", Not at Home: The Suppression of Domesticity in Modern Art and Architecture, Christopher Reed, ed., London: Thames and Hudson, (1996).
- "Chinese Sketching on an American Plane: The Art of Sy Jiang", exhibition catalogue, Wang Chi Mei Gallery, Taiwan, Spring 1995.
- "Book Review: Investigating Sex, Surrealist Discussions 1928-1932", New Art Examiner (November 1994).
- "Be Our Guest, Be Our Guest, Put Our Magic to the Test", New Art Examiner (May 1994).
- "Conceal/Reveal", exhibition catalogue, School of Art and Design, University of Illinois at Urbana-Champaign, November 1993.
- "William Wegman's Recent Paintings and Drawings", exhibition catalogue, School of Art and Design, University of Illinois at Urbana-Champaign, September 1992.
- "A Telling Surface: Gestural Abstraction in the Nineties", exhibition catalogue, Sazama Gallery, January 1991.
- "Chicago: Beyond Imagism", Art International 11 (Summer 1990), 73-75.
- "Eastern Kentucky Folk Art: A Contribution to the History of Spiritual Expression", exhibition catalogue, Gallery Nine, University of Illinois 1988

== Public lectures, presentations, performances ==
- Spring 2014 Lecture/Tour, Wainwright and Myers on Isa Genzken, Museum of Contemporary Art, Chicago, Illinois
- Winter 2013 Finding Common Ground: Academics, Artists, and Museums, College Art Association Conference, Chicago, Illinois
- Fall 2013 Exceptional Students, Exceptional Formats, Association of Independent Colleges of Art and Design Conferencem, Baltimore, Maryland
- Spring 2013 Didact with Lou Mallozzi, MCA Chicago
- Summer 2012 Commencement Address, The Catherine Cook School, Chicago.
- Summer 2012 Pecha Kucha Presentation, Volume 22, Chicago.
- Spring 2012 Sorting Through Rubble: Collage for the Subject of War, College Art Association Conference, Los Angeles.
- Spring 2012 Sorting Through Rubble: Collage for the Subject of War, Cranbrook Academy of Art, Bloomfield Hills, Michigan.
- Spring 2011 Andy Warhol, Decadence, and Contemporary Art, The Arts Club of Chicago.
- Winter 2011 Who, Where, What, and When is Contemporary Art, Kalamazoo Arts League, Kalamazoo Institute of Art.
- Winter 2009 Decadent Ornament, College Art Association Conference, Los Angeles.
- Spring 2008 Lisa Wainwright on Robert Rauschenberg, badatsports.com, Contemporary Art Talk, Episode #144.
- Spring 2008 Panel Discussant, New Insights Exhibition, Artropolis, Chicago.
- Winter 2008 Rauschenberg and After, session chair, College Art Association Conference, Dallas.
- Fall 2007 Multiple Networking: World Forum for Higher Professional Art Education, Taipei National University of the Arts, Leadership Conference, Taiwan.
- Spring 2007 Pink Decay: The Femme Fatale in Contemporary Art, Converse College, South Carolina.
- Spring 2007 On Decadence in Contemporary Art, The Otis College of Art and Design, Los Angeles.
- Winter 2007 Framing the Issues: A New Institutionalism: Where Artists and Curators Meet, School of the Art Institute of Chicago.
- Winter 2007 Femme Fatales: Then and Now, Modern and Contemporary Art and the Idea of Decadence Conference, The Municipal House and FAMU, Prague, Czechoslovkia.
- Winter 2006 Liberated Pink, Converse College, Spartenberg, South Carolina.
- Fall 2005 Julio Gonzalez: Beauty and the Avant-Garde, Chicago Cultural Center, Chicago.
- Fall 2005 A Century of Counter-Culture, Mary and Leigh Block Museum of Art, Northwestern University.
- Spring 2005 Ed Paschke and Toulouse Lautrec: Picturing the Demi-Monde, The Art Institute of Chicago.
- Spring 2004 Mardsden Hartley's Number Five, The Terra Museum of American Art, Chicago.
- Summer 2003 The Twentieth-Century Paradigm Shift: from Abstract Expressionism to Pop, The Terra Museum of American Art, Chicago.
- Spring 2003 Found on the Floor, College Art Association Conference, New York, New York.
- Summer 2002 The Art of Enigma and John Graham, The Terra Museum of American Art, Chicago.
- Spring 2002 Commencement Address, School of Art and Design, University of Illinois
- Spring 2002 Rauschenberg and Johns: Southerners Shift the New York Canon, The Terra Museum of American Art, Chicago.
- Spring 2002 Questioning Nature in the Postmodern World, Art Institute of Chicago.
- Fall 2001 Appraising Junk: On the History of the Found Object in Art, Northwestern University, Evanston, Illinois.
- Spring 2001 From Steel to Flesh, Indiana University, Northwest.
- Spring 2001 Session Chair, Appraising Junk: Organizing Principles, College Art Association Conference, Chicago.
- Spring 2000 Gallery Talk, Age of Influence: Reflections of American Culture, Museum of Contemporary Art, Chicago.
- Fall 1998 The Art of Raymond Pettibon, The Renaissance Society, University of Chicago.
- Spring 1998 Robert Rauschenberg's Impressionist Subjects, Potpourri Lecture Series, Art Institute of Chicago.
- Spring 1998 Liberated Pink: A Feminine Signifier Updated for the Nineties, College Art Association Conference, Toronto, Canada.
- Winter 1997 Renoir's Heirs: Impressions of Modernity at SAIC, President's Annual Dinner, School of the Art Institute of Chicago.
- Winter 1997 A Look at Contemporary Art, Lecture Series for the Museum of Contemporary Art, Chicago.
- Fall 1997 Robert Rauschenberg: The Subjects of Monet in 1960s New York, Art Institute of Chicago.
- Spring 1997 Exhibiting 1968: Art as an Agent of Cultural Memory, Mary and Leigh Block Gallery, Northwestern University.
- Fall 1996 A Look at Contemporary Art, Lecture Series for the Museum of Contemporary Art, Chicago.
- Summer 1996 Cameo Series: Richard Miller's Woman with a White Shall. Terra Museum of American Art, Chicago.
- Summer 1995 The Myths of Modernism: History and Critique, Lecture Series for the Women's Athletic Club, Chicago.
- Summer 1995 Life Into Art: A History of the Found Object, Guest Lecturer for Museum Education Department, Art Institute of Chicago.
- Summer 1995 Cameo Series: Walt Kuhn's Clown with Drum", Terra Museum of American Art, Chicago
- Spring 1995 Scaling Modernism, Performative Art History Event, Mies van der Rohe stairs, Chicago Arts Club.
- Spring 1995 Hoovers, Shoes and Tires: A Brief History of the Found Object in 20th Century Art, Invited Lecturer, Converse College, South Carolina.
- Spring 1995 Franz Kline: A Retrospective, Four Lectures for the Chicago Museum of Contemporary Art.
- May 1994 Commencement Address, School of Art and Design Graduation, University of Illinois at Urbana-Champaign.
- Fall 1994 Life into Art: Found Objects as a Twentieth-Century Medium, Lecture Series, The Art Institute of Chicago.
- Spring 1994 Where the Boys Are: Homosexual Text in the Art of Robert Rauschenberg, College Art Association Conference, Chicago.
- Spring 1994 Cameo Series: Thomas Cole's Landscape with Figures: A Scene from The Last of the Mohicans, Guest Lecturer, Terra Museum of American Art, Chicago.
- Fall 1993 An Explanation of Fluxus (Without The Mess), Guest Lecturer, Society for Contemporary Art, Art Institute of Chicago.
- Spring 1993 American Art in Transition: 1955 – 1962, Four Lectures, Chicago Museum of Contemporary Art.
- Spring 1993 The Jason Rubell Collection, Lecture Series, Dupage County Art Museum, Dupage College.
- Spring 1993 Fin de Siecle Glamour, Guest Lecturer, Tulane University, New Orleans, Louisiana.
- Spring 1993 Cameo Series: Patrick Henry Bruce's Peinture, Guest Lecturer, Terra Museum of American Art, Chicago.
- Spring 1993 Robert Rauschenberg's Fabrics: Reclaiming Domestic Space, College Art Association Conference, Seattle, Washington.
- Fall 1992 Cameo Series: James McNeill Whistler's A Red Note, Guest Lecturer, Terra Museum of American Art, Chicago.
- Spring 1992 The Post-War Era and Robert Rauschenberg, Four Lectures, Museum of Contemporary Art, Chicago.
- Fall 1991 Cameo Series: George Tooker's Highway, Guest Lecturer, Terra Museum of American Art, Chicago.
- Fall 1991 The Spiritual in Art: 1900 – 1950, Guest Lecturer, Museum Education Department, Art Institute of Chicago.
- Spring 1991 Robert Rauschenberg's Monogram: Just Who Is That Goat?, The Midwest Art History Society Annual Meeting, Lawrence, Kansas.
- Spring 1991 The Visibility of Contemporary Abstract Painting in Chicago, Panel Discussion Moderator, The Sazama Gallery, Chicago.
- Spring 1991 Resurrecting the Christian Rauschenberg, The 1990-91 Chicago Art History Colloquia.
- Fall 1988 Joseph Beuys: German Nationalism and the Arts, Guest Lecturer, course on Post-War Art, University of Illinois.
- Spring 1988 In Praise of Women Artists, Panel Discussant, Video Series For Art's Sake, Parkland College Art Gallery.
- Spring 1987 Alexander Calder's Mobiles, Visions in Mark Rothko's Paintings, and Robert Rauschenberg and Jasper Johns: New American Realists, Three Lectures for a course on Post-War Art, University of Illinois.
- April 1985 Gustave Klimt's Murals for the University of Vienna, Graduate Student Symposium, The Art Institute of Chicago.
