= Cat Chow (artist) =

American Fashion Designer and Textile Artist (born 1973)

- Born: 1973 (age 52–53); New Jersey, U.S.
- Known for: Fashion
- Website: www.cat-chow.com

Cat Chow (born 1973) is an American fashion designer and textile artist who makes garments from unconventional materials.

== Life ==
Chow grew up in New Jersey before moving to Chicago. She majored in costume design at Northwestern University and graduated in 1995. She worked for other fashion designers before going solo.

== Career ==
Chow is known for designs incorporating zippers, measuring tapes, Power Ranger collector playing cards, and even a dress made from 1,000 shredded US $1 bills.

== Exhibitions ==
- The Metropolitan Museum of Art
- The Louis Comfort Tiffany Foundation
- Museum of Contemporary Craft
