= Kathryn Hixson =

Kathryn Hixson (1955–2010) was born in Austin, Texas. She was the daughter of Elmer Hixson (an electrical engineering professor at the University of Texas). She was an educator, historian, curator, and critic who lived her entire professional life in Chicago.

== Education ==
Hixson attended Carlton College in Minnesota intent on majoring in Music and studying the harpsichord, but she switched to art and earned a BA in 1977. She earned an MFA rom the School of the Art Institute with in 1985, and taught intermittently at the school for the remainder of her life. She earned a PhD in art history from the University of Texas, Austin in 2007. Her doctoral dissertation was titled Body/Image: Presentation and Representation of the Figure through 1970s: Bruce Nauman, Rebecca Horn, Richard Prince, Martin Kippenberger.

== Career ==
Hixson was Chicago correspondent for Arts magazine from 1989 until the magazine's demise in 1992. She was editor of New Art Examiner from 1993 to 2002, and taught in the School of the Art Institute's department of Art Criticism, History & Theory throughout her professional life. Hixson co-organized many insightful and provocative exhibitions, including Youth Culture Killed My Dog (but I don't really mind), Interchange (2007) at the Creative Research Laboratory at the University of Texas (2007), and Killing Time, (2010).
