= Paul Klein (art dealer) =

American art dealer (born 1946–2020)

Paul Robert Klein (1946–2020) was an American art dealer. He owned and operated the Klein Art Works gallery in Chicago until 2004. He was chosen as 2006 Man of the Year by the Chicago Society of Artists.

== Life and work ==
Klein owned and operated Klein Art Works, a cutting-edge art gallery in Chicago until 2004. Originally located in River North Gallery District, in 1981 it moved to River West in 1989 contributing to the development of that gallery area.

He worked for the Bridge Group providing financial and legacy planning for collectors. He was the first executive director of the Chicago ART Project. From 2004 to 2008 he was the art curator for the 2,500,000-square-foot (230,000 m^{2}) expansion of McCormick Place, the editor of ArtLetter, and wrote for "Chicago Life" which was distributed regionally in The New York Times.

The Museum of Contemporary Art Chicago's 12 x 12 program of presenting one Chicago artist a month is attributable to him.

He died on October 11, 2020, in Chicago. He is survived by his wife and children.

== Awards ==
- 2006 Man of the Year, Chicago Society of Artists

== See also ==
- Protest art
