= New Art Examiner =

American art magazine

- Editor: Daniel Nanavati
- Categories: Art magazine
- Frequency: Bimonthly
- Founded: 1973
- Country: United Kingdom
- Based in: Cornwall
- Language: English
- Website: www.newartexaminer.net

The New Art Examiner is a bi-monthly international magazine of critical art thinking founded in Chicago, Illinois in October 1973 by Derek Guthrie and Jane Addams Allen. Publication ceased in 2002. The magazine was relaunched in Cornwall, UK in September of 2015 by the original publisher and co-founder, Derek Guthrie, and Daniel Nanavati with Tom Mullaney in Chicago. In 2017, there was a split between Guthrie and then US Editor Michel Segard, leading to an ongoing trademark dispute between Derek Guthrie and the Chicago enterprise. Both publications have print and online editions.

An anthology of representative articles and editors from New Art Examiner, Essential New Art Examiner, was published in 2011. Each section of the book begins with a new essay by the original editor of the pieces therein that reconsiders the era and larger issues at play in the local, national, and international art world when the works were first published.

== History ==
At the time of the New Art Examiner's launch in October 1973, Chicago was "an art backwater", according to Artnet's Victor Cassidy. Artists who wished to be taken seriously left Chicago for New York City, and apart from a few local phenomena, such as the Hairy Who, little attention was given to Chicago art and artists. For the generations of artists who grew up reading the New Art Examiner, it provided a unique vantage point outside the artistic mainstream.

According to Terri Griffith and Kathryn Born, the New Art Examiner was "the only successful art magazine ever to come out of Chicago." It enjoyed a nearly three-decade long run, and since its founding in 1973 by Jane Addams Allen and Derek Guthrie, no art periodical published in the Windy City has lasted longer or has achieved the critical mass of readers and admirers that it did. Editor Jane Addams Allen, an art historian who studied under Harold Rosenberg at the University of Chicago and a relative of progressive reformer Jane Addams, was influential in developing new writers who later became significant on the New York scene and encouraged a writing style that was lively, personal, and honestly critical. It is cited by its creator as the largest art magazine of the time outside of New York.

Called "a stalwart of the Chicago scene" by Art in America, the New Art Examiner was conceived to counter this bias, and was almost the only art magazine to give any attention to Chicago and Midwestern artists (Dialogue magazine, which covered Midwestern art exclusively, was founded in Detroit in 1978, but it has also ceased publication).

Critics and artists who wrote for the New Art Examiner included Devonna Pieszak, Fred Camper, Jan Estep, Ann Wiens, Bill Stamets, Michael A. Weinstein, Adam Green, Robert Storr, Carol Diehl, Jerry Saltz, Eleanor Heartney, Betty McCasland, Carol Squiers, Janet Koplos, Vince Carducci, Danielle Probst, Buzz Spector, and Mark Staff Brandl.

== Criticisms ==
Over the next three decades Chicago's art scene flourished, with new museums, more art dealers, and increased art festivals, galleries, and alternative spaces. Critics asserted that the New Art Examiner "ignored, opposed or belittled" Chicago's artistic developments, that it was overly politicized and overloaded with jargon, and did not serve the Chicago or midwest arts communities.

== Anthology ==
In 2008, Derek Guthrie visited Chicago, not long after the death of his wife Jane Addams Allen, to give a lecture. The event spurred a great homecoming and intense discussion about art publishing. The flurry of excitement prompted Terri Griffith and Kathryn Born to create an anthology to help a new generation understand the significance of the New Art Examiner. In this age of de-centralized media, the idea of a publication being so central to the art scene is almost mythical. To imagine a simple magazine as the only source of information and news on a topic is the stuff of a bygone era.

The articles in the Essential New Art Examiner are organized chronologically. Each section of the book begins with a new essay by the original editor of the pieces therein that reconsiders the era and larger issues at play in the art world when they were first published. The result is a fascinating inside look at the artistic trends and aesthetic agendas that guided it. Derek Guthrie and Jane Addams Allen, for instance, had their own renegade style. The story of the New Art Examiner is the story of a constantly evolving publication, shaped by talented editors and the times in which it was printed.

The volume was co-edited by Examiner writer Janet Koplos. The editors settled upon the idea of showcasing representative articles and spotlighting the editors, choosing this concise, "best of" format to catch the high points. Yet this format also omits the chronology, complexities, financials, scandals and personalities that accompany any art magazine. There is more to the story than is contained in this anthology.

Whether memories are fond or not-so-fond, New Art Examiner is a reflection of the intellectually aware 1970s Chicago art scene that gave birth to this feisty periodical.

Essential New Art Examiner was published by Northern Illinois University Press in November 2011, and distributed by University of Chicago Press.

== See also ==
- Visual arts of Chicago
