= Mark Staff Brandl =

Artist, art historian and philosopher of art

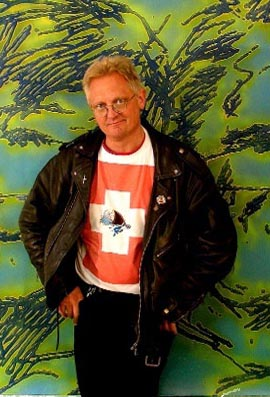
- Born: May 19, 1955 (age 71); Peoria, Illinois, U.S.
- Education: University of Zurich
- Known for: painting, installation art, art history
- Movement: Mongrel Art
- Spouse: Cornelia Kunz Brandl
- Website: markstaffbrandl.com; drgreatart.ch

Mark Staff Brandl (born 1955) is an American-born artist, art historian and philosopher of art now living primarily in Switzerland.

== History ==
Born in Peoria, Illinois and raised in Pekin, Illinois, Brandl is the son of Earl and Ruth Brandl, and brother of Marcia Brandl Willhite. He lived for many years in Chicago, Illinois, where his career in fine art began. Brandl has lived primarily in Trogen, Appenzell Ausserrhoden, Switzerland since 1988. He studied art, art history, literature and literary theory at the University of Illinois at Urbana-Champaign, Illinois State University, and Columbia Pacific University, and completed his Ph.D. in art history and metaphor theory under Philip Ursprung at the University of Zurich in 2011. Brandl is an Associate Professor/Dozent Emeritus in art history, painting, art theory and comics at the Art Academy of Liechtenstein in Nendeln, Liechtenstein and the Higher Technical Academy for Visual Art in St. Gallen, Switzerland. Brandl is most well known for his self-labeled "mongrel art": hybrids of installation and sequential paintings and drawings, which occasionally incorporate lectures as performances.

== Exhibitions and Publications ==
Brandl is active internationally as an artist since 1980, has won various awards, had many publications and had numerous exhibitions. His shows include galleries and museums in the US, Switzerland, Germany, Italy, Egypt, the Caribbean; specific cities include Paris, Moscow, Chicago, Los Angeles and New York. As a critic, he has been a frequent contributor to London's The Art Book and a Contributing Editor for New York's Art in America. He has frequently collaborated with fellow former Pekinite Th. Emil Homerin. Brandl has also been a contributor to Sharkforum, a critical website concerning art and contributes to the renowned art critical podcast Bad at Sports. Due to his participation in these publications and his many exhibitions, Brandl has become highly visible in the Chicago and New York art worlds, as well as in Europe. Recent exhibitions include a painting-installation in St. Gallen Switzerland and Berlin, Germany and a performance-art lecture in documenta 13 in Kassel, Germany in 2012. His newest project begun in 2017 is a series of lectures on art history presented entertainingly as performances with painted backdrops and within entire installations of paintings. Brandl calls this project, as well as himself in it, "Dr Great Art." As a part of this, he has a biweekly podcast also titled 'Dr Great Art.' Brandl's philosophy book for Bloomsbury Press for the "Aesthetics and Contemporary Art" Series (David Carrier and Tiziana Andina, editors), titled A Philosophy of Visual Metaphor in Contemporary Art was published in 2023. A book titled Covering Brandl, on 22 years of essays about his art by the author and theorist Daniel F. Ammann was published in 2020 by Magoria Press.

== Collections ==
He is also the curator of The Collapsible Kunsthalle and the Kunstgrill in Zurich. Works of his have been acquired by the Museum of Modern Art in New York, Victoria and Albert Museum in London, the Whitney Museum of American Art in New York, the Museum of Contemporary Art in Chicago, the St. Gallen Art Museum, The Thurgau Museum of Fine Art, The E.T.H. Graphic Collection in Zurich, The Museum of Contemporary Art in Los Angeles, the National Museum of Cartoon Art, the Art Museum Olten and others.
