= Ed Paschke =

American painter (1939–2004)

- Born: Edward Francis Paschke; June 22, 1939; Chicago, Illinois, U.S.
- Died: November 25, 2004 (aged 65); Chicago, Illinois, U.S.
- Education: School of the Art Institute of Chicago (BFA, MFA)
- Spouse: Nancy Cohn

Edward Francis Paschke (June 22, 1939 – November 25, 2004) was an American painter. His childhood interest in animation and cartoons, as well as his father's creativity in wood carving and construction, led him toward a career in art. As a student at the School of the Art Institute of Chicago he was influenced by many artists featured in the museum's special exhibitions, in particular the work of Gauguin, Picasso and Seurat.

== Life ==
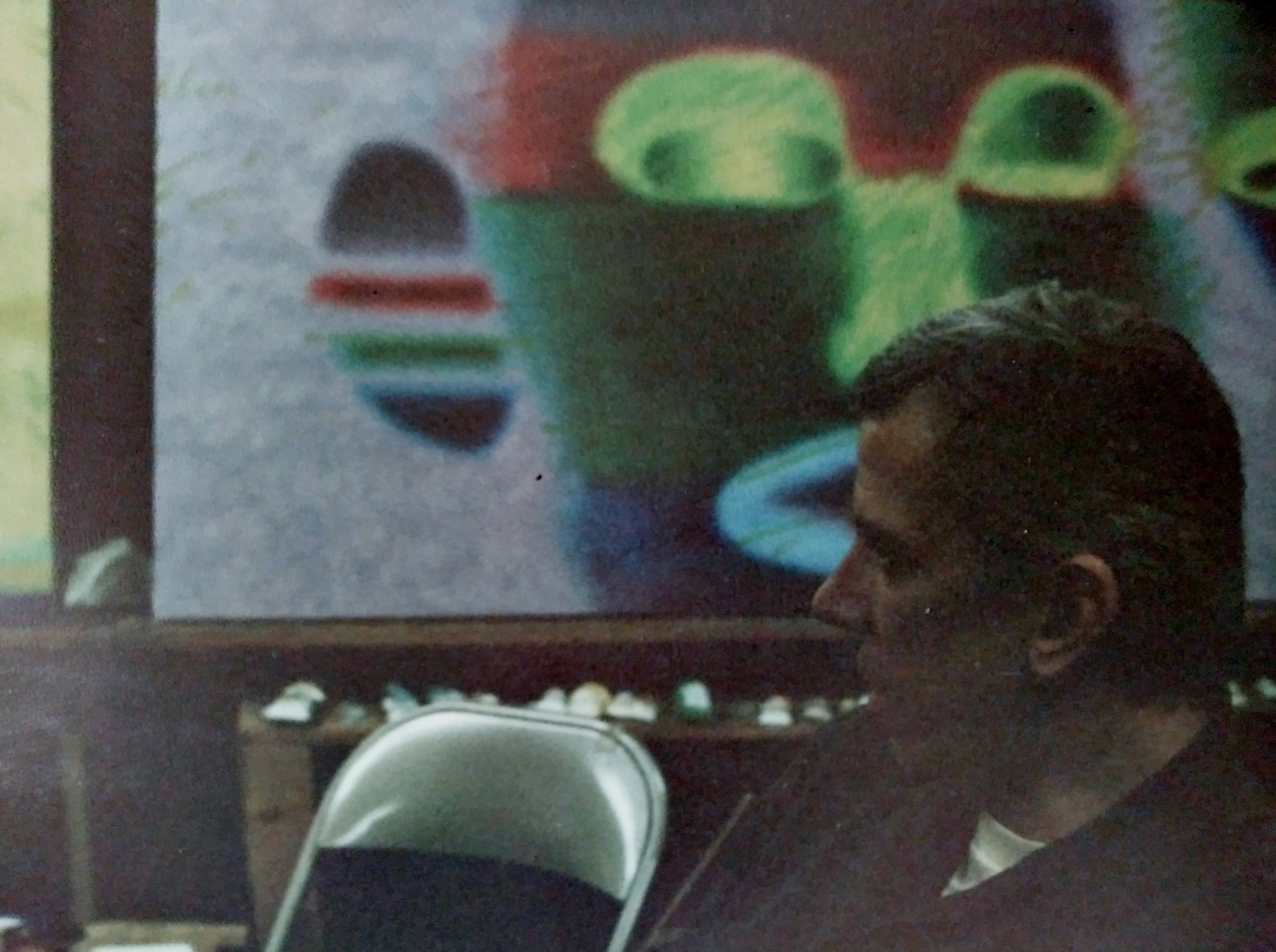
Ed Paschke in his Howard Street Studio, c. 1986

Paschke was born in 1939 in Chicago, where he spent most of his life. He received his bachelor of fine arts degree from the School of the Art Institute of Chicago in 1961, and later his master's degree in art in 1970 from the same school. Drafted into the Army on November 4, 1962, he was sent to Fort Polk, Louisiana, where he worked in the Training Aids Department, working on projects including illustrations for publications, signs, targets and manuals to explain weapons and procedures to incoming troops. He became a regular illustrator for Playboy Magazine, specializing in colorful, sexually suggestive images that reflected his own fine art.

In 1976, he started to teach at Northwestern University. He was a sensitive and supportive professor, often inviting students to his Howard Street studio and forging personal relationships. He sometimes allowed his students to paint on his works-in-progress in his studio, explaining that it would keep him from falling back on his trademark "gestures." He even embarked on a collaboration with Northwestern student Steve Albini of Big Black, though it is not known if any finished product came from the collaboration. On November 22, 1968, Paschke married Nancy Cohn; with whom he had a son Marc, and a daughter Sharon.

Paschke lived and worked in Chicago, where he died in his house on Thanksgiving day, 2004, apparently of heart failure. His wife Nancy Paschke was an artist as well and died seven weeks after him on January 17, 2005, in Chicago.

== Work ==
Although Paschke was inclined toward representational imagery, he learned to paint based on the principles of abstraction and expressionism. Like many Chicago artists, he had a fondness for outsider art, as well as tattoo art. There is a picture of him from the late 1970s showing his body covered in elaborate tattoos that he claimed he would often paint on himself for personal gratification.

He avidly collected photographs-related visual media in all its forms, from newspapers, magazines, and posters to film, television, and video, with a preference for imagery that tended toward the risqué and the marginal. Through this he studied the ways in which these media transformed and stylized the experience of reality, which in turn impacted on his consideration of formal and philosophical questions concerning veracity and invention in his own painting. At the same time, he sought living and working situations—from factory hand to psychiatric aide—that would connect him with Chicago's diverse ethnic communities as well as feed his fascination for gritty urban life and human abnormality. Thus he developed a distinctive body of work that oscillated between personal and aesthetic introspection and confronting social and cultural values.

In 1968, his drawing of Bugs Bunny, Porky Pig and Petunia Pig was published as the back cover of Witzend number 5.

In his early paintings Paschke both incorporated and challenged depictions of legendary figures by transforming them into corps exquis, such as Pink Lady (1970) where he set Marilyn Monroe’s famous head atop the suited body of an anonymous male accordion player; or Painted Lady (1971) where he redesigned screen legend Claudette Colbert as a tattooed lady fresh from a freak show. Another direction through which he explored the features and quirks of meaning and logic was in paintings of leather accessories interpreted as anthropomorphized fetish objects, such as Hairy Shoes (1971) and Bag Boots (1972).

In the decades separating Pink Lady and Matinee (1987), Paschke shifted his interest from print to electronic media and a dazzling spectrum of televisual waves and flashes began to fill the paintings. Forms and images disintegrated, broken apart in the fabric of electronic disturbance and its surface. In Matinee, the face of Elvis Presley is fragmented into a field of glowing swathes of color with lips and eyes alone suggesting the human presence beneath the electronic overlay.

Paschke made use of an overhead projector to layer images, which he then rendered using the traditional and time-consuming medium of oil painting. He began with an underpainting in black and white, using a simple can of "Tru-Test" house paint, then addressed it with refined systems of colored glazing or impasto to enliven the optical and physical textures of his painting. He often used synthetic Phthalocynine colors to achieve his neon colored look. With this original and painstaking process he created a formal parallel with the black-and-white-to-color progression in the historical development of printing, film, and television images, at the same time moving the subject matter from the particular to the non-specific to allow a wider range of interpretation. In his later work, once again forms became more solidified, moving back towards certain kinds of psychologized presences and the edgy tension that characterized his earlier work.

Unlike most of his Pop predecessors with their embrace of popular culture, Paschke gravitated towards the images that exemplified the underside of American values—fame, violence, sex, and money—a preference that he shared with Andy Warhol, who was one of his foremost inspirations. In the fall of 1984, he was featured on the cover of Art in America magazine, with a review of his work offered as an alternative to the then popular Neo-Expressionism that was sweeping the New York art scene. Later considered to be an artist of his own time and place, his explorations of the archetypes and clichés of media identity prefigured the appropriative gestures of the "Pictures Generation" and for a new generation of global artists his totemic, eye-popping paintings have come to embody the essence of cosmopolitan art.

In 2000, Paschke was awarded a Guggenheim Fellowship for Fine Arts.

His work is included many museum collections including: the Art Institute of Chicago, the Madison Museum of Contemporary Art, Walker Art Center, Minneapolis, Hirshhorn Museum and Sculpture Garden, Washington D.C., Whitney Museum of American Art, New York, Centre Pompidou, Paris, and Museum of Modern and Contemporary Art, Strasbourg.

Major exhibitions include:

- Ed Paschke: Selected Works 1967–1981, Renaissance Society, University of Chicago (1982, traveled to the Contemporary Art Museum, Houston)
- Ed Paschke Retrospective, Centre Pompidou, Paris (1989–1990, traveled to the Dallas Museum, Texas and the Art Institute of Chicago, 1990–1991)
- Ed Paschke: Recent Work, Illinois Institute of Art - Chicago (2003)
- Ed Paschke: Chicago Icon, A Retrospective, Chicago History Museum (2006)

At the time of his death a New York critic lamented that Paschke's "contribution to the art of his time was somewhat obscured by his distance from New York." Since his death there have been several museum and gallery exhibitions of Paschke's work, including in 2010 a museum-quality show at Gagosian Gallery on Madison Avenue in New York City, curated by noted pop artist Jeff Koons. As a student, Koons admired Paschke's work and became his assistant in Chicago in the mid-1970s while attending the School of the Art Institute of Chicago. Paschke would prove to be an important mentor and formative inspiration for the young artist. Paschke's influence in both his subject matter and pioneering use of color continues to influence artists around the world.

On June 22, 2014, a gallery in the Jefferson Park neighborhood of Chicago opened to commemorate the works of Paschke alongside his fellow Chicago artists at the Ed Paschke Art Center.
