= Ox-Bow School of Art and Artists Residency =

Artists' colony in Saugatuck, Michigan, United States

Ox-Bow School of Art & Artists' Residency
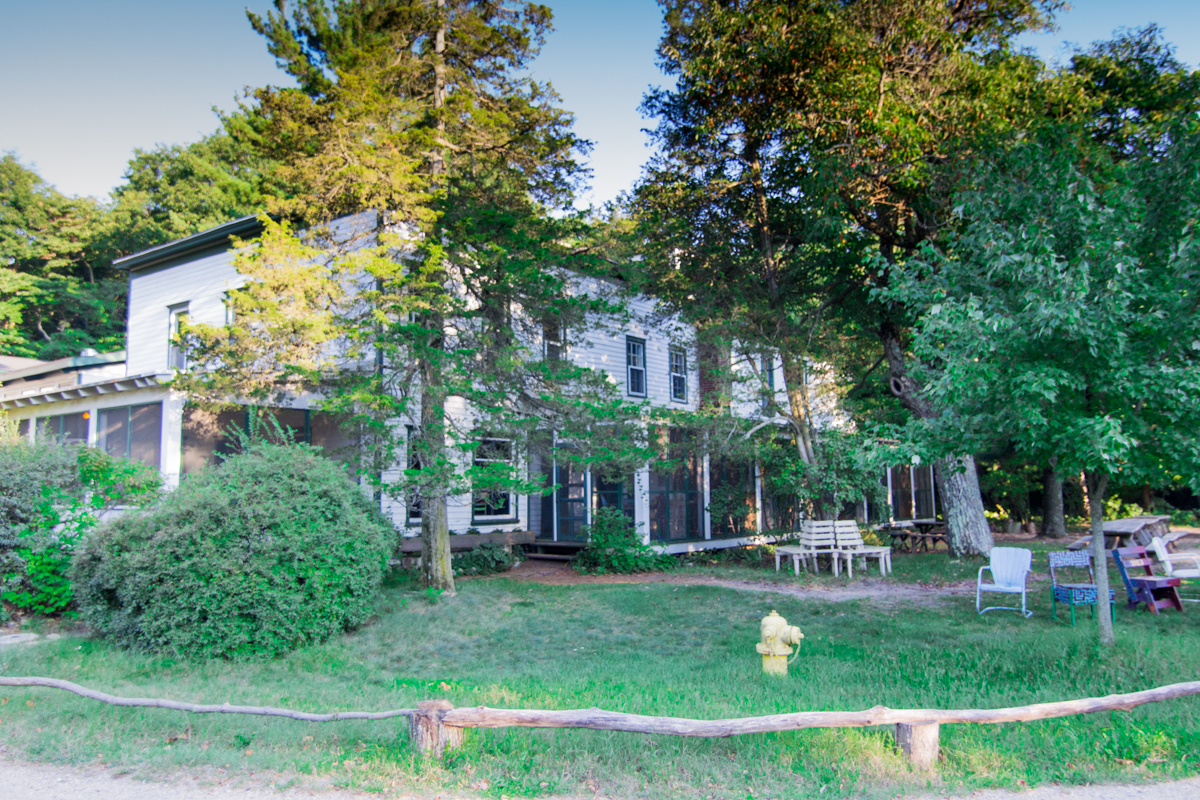
- Formation: 1910
- Type: Artists Residency, Nonprofit organization, School
- Location: 3435 Rupprect Way, Saugatuck, Michigan United States
- Website: www.ox-bow.org

The Ox-Bow School of Art & Artists' Residency is an artists' residency program in Saugatuck, Michigan, United States, founded in 1908 by artists Frederick F. Fursman and Walter Marshall Clute, both of whom taught at the School of the Art Institute of Chicago.

The founding mission of Ox-Bow was to provide a community and laboratory for artistic experimentation away from the city. The founding members of the school were inspired by their studies in French Impressionism and wanted to create a space for plein-air painting in inspiring landscapes. Since those early years, the school curriculum has grown to include various other methods of painting, sculpture, ceramics, papermaking, glass-blowing, and weaving.

In addition to offering courses for academic credit in the summer and winter seasons, Ox-Bow offers fellowships and residencies for practicing artists of all media.

== History ==
In the early years, Ox-Bow was called the "Saugatuck Summer School of Painting." In those days, classes were held at the Bandle Farm, just a mile up the Kalamazoo River from the present location of the school. In 1914, classes moved to the Riverside Rest Hotel in the village of Saugatuck. The Riverside Rest was later known as the Ox-Bow Inn, after ox-bow-shaped bend of the Kalamazoo River. The owners of the then Riverside Hotel, the Shriver Family had hoped that the area would be a major port for commerce along the Great Lakes. However, after the river channel was reshaped to flow directly into Lake Michigan, the area saw a great decline in both leisure and commercial visitors. Due to the shrinking clientele, the Shrivers agreed to lease their property to the group of artists visiting from Chicago. That building, now dubbed "The Inn," still stands on Ox-Bow campus and serves as gallery space, offices, and dormitories for students, staff, and visiting artists.

In 1920, prominent architect and friend of the school's founding members, Thomas Eddy Tallmadge, encouraged the school to purchase the buildings and grounds to ensure its future. Tallmadge contributed a significant amount of funding towards this effort and also bought an additional hundred acres of land adjacent to the property (Tallmadge Woods). Today much of that land remains wooded and accessible via footpaths. There are several cottages for artists situated on that extension of the property, which include The Tallmadge, the Norton, Scanlon, and the Mary K.

== Mission ==
"The mission of Ox-Bow, in keeping with its history, is to sustain a haven for nurturing the creative process, through instruction, example, and community [...] Ox-Bow is of and about art and nurturing of the artist. Since its inception, one common thread runs through it; a place apart, open to the senses with the artistic freedom and permission to pursue ideas in the open landscape of wind, sand, sky, and water."

The primary founding artists of The Saugatuck Summer School of Painting, Frederick Fursman and Walter Marshall Clute were inspired by their work in and research into European art school traditions and sought to model their school after places like the Smith Academy and Academe Julian. They wanted to create a space where artistic learning happened in the classroom, studio, concours (critique), as well as in nature, soirées, and as a part of the experience of living in an artists' community.

== School and residency ==
Ox-Bow School of Art & Artists' Residency offers year-round programming and classes for a range of artistic interests and levels of expertise. The majority of the classes take place during the summer months (June–August), and are one to two weeks in length. The Leroy Neiman Fellowship Program offers 12 students from around the country to have the opportunity to spend the entire summer at Ox-Bow. They are provided with studio space, access to facilities, visiting artists and classes. Artist and writer residencies are also offered during the summer and fall for participants to work in the studios and engage with a community of artists.

Former executive director of Ox-Bow Jason Kalajainen remarked in a recent interview that the student body is consistently diverse. Primarily this diversity is evident in regards to degree-seeking and non-degree seeking participants, and in the range of ages and professional experience. He stated, "We have professional artists, SAIC graduates and undergraduates, and avocational students all in the same studio. This makes for a dynamic environment and serves everyone quite well. Classes are small – usually eight to 14 students – which ensures that the instructor can meet each individual's needs. We really encourage exploration in other media, as well [...] Throwing someone into a totally new arena is quite common at Ox-Bow." And in terms of the range of media supported and classes offered, he stated, "If there's an idea for a course or project, our goal is to support the artist in making it. If it's feasible, we try our best to help make it happen."

== Ox-Bow House ==
Ox-Bow House is a pilot project that began in 2022. With a community of nationally and internationally respected artists on their campus each year, Ox-Bow House seeks to extend this resource to the public through a diverse menu of programs throughout the year.

The name Ox-Bow House acknowledges the legacy of the historic building as a place for community and reflects its intended role as a space for learning and exploration. The location is intended to serve community members in western Michigan as well as summer visitors to Douglas and Saugatuck. The space will include an exhibition hall, programming facilities, and a retail area featuring curated art and design objects by alumni and artists from throughout the region and beyond. In addition to artistic programming, Ox-Bow House will house administrative offices and archives, with the latter expected to be made available to the public for research in 2023.

== Ox-Bow Chicago ==
Ox-Bow opened a satellite office in Chicago, Illinois in 2026.

== Notable alumni ==
- Albert Krehbiel
- Amanda Ross-Ho
- Angela Dufresne
- Aspen Mays
- Barbara Crane
- Ben Mahmoud
- Beth Lipman
- Burr Tillstrom
- Carrie Schneider
- Christina Ramberg
- Christine Tarkowski
- Claes Oldenburg
- Corin Hewitt
- Cynthia Carlson
- Don Baum
- Ed Paschke
- Edith Altman
- Edward Flood
- Ellen Lanyon
- Ernesto Pujol
- Frances Whitehead
- Francis Chapin
- Frank Piatek
- Frederick Fursman
- Hank Adams
- Hank Feeley
- Harrell Fletcher
- Harry Bouras
- Herb Babcock
- Hesse MacGraw
- Hollis Sigler
- Irving Petlin
- Isobel MacKinnon Rupprecht
- Jack Beal
- Jack Lemmon
- Jack Troy
- Jacolby Satterwhite
- James Benning
- James Hyde
- Janet Fish
- Jerry Saltz
- Jim Henson
- Joan Mitchell
- John Torreano
- John Warner Norton
- Josh Faught
- Joshua Kind
- Joyce Kozloff
- Julie Ault
- Karen Willenbrink-Johnsen
- Karl Wirsum
- Katrin Sigurdardottir
- Keith Achepohl
- Kevin Appel
- Laylah Ali
- Lee Walton
- Leif Brush
- Lenore Tawney
- Leon Golub
- LeRoy Neiman
- Leslie Bostrom
- Marcia Tucker
- Margo Hoff
- Mark Dion
- Mark Pascale
- Martha Wilson
- Martyl
- Max Kahn
- Max Kozloff
- Maya Hayuk
- Melanie Schiff
- Michelle Grabner
- Miyoko Ito
- Molly Zuckerman-Hartung
- Nancy Spero
- Neil Frankel
- Nick Cave
- Norwood Viviano
- Paul Marioni
- Paula Hayes
- Paula Wilson
- Peter Agostini
- Peter Saul
- Philip Hanson
- Phyllis Bramson
- Richard Artschwager
- Richard Haas
- Richard Hunt
- Richard Rezac
- Rob Fischer
- Ron Gorchov
- Rudolph Pen
- Sarah Canright
- Scott Reeder
- Shannon R. Stratton
- Shinique Smith
- Sondra Freckelton
- Squeak Carnwath
- Stanley Tigerman
- Sterling Ruby
- Susanna Coffey
- Suzi Gablik
- Theaster Gates
- Thomas Eddy Tallmadge
- Thomas Lawson
- Tim Barrett
- Tom Holmes
- Tucker Nichols
- Vera Berdich
- William O'Brien
- Willie Cole
- Yutaka Sone
- Minoosh Zomorodinia
