= Common Field =

American network of arts organizations

Common Field (2015–2022) was an American national network of artist-centered organizations and projects. Founded in 2014 by co-founders Elizabeth Chodos, Courtney Fink, Nat May, Stephanie Sherman, Abigail Statinsky, and Shannon Stratton, with support from the Andy Warhol Foundation for the Visual Arts, it hosted meet-ups for artists, organizers, and cultural professionals as an opportunity to share ideas and arts advocacy strategies.

== History ==
Common Field held its first official meet up in Minneapolis, Minnesota (September 2015); followed by Miami, Florida (2016); Los Angeles (2017); and Philadelphia (April 2019). Key funders included the Knight Foundation and the Andrew W. Mellon Foundation, which supported its national convenings and advocacy initiatives.

In 2021, Common Field made the decision to begin an intentional sunsetting process and closed as an organization in December 2022.

In 2022, the Jack Straw Cultural Center in partnership with Common Field produced 'Common Work' the organization's final project before closing its doors. Common Work: Learnings for the Future from Common Field is a podcast and writing series that paired podcast episodes with commissioned essays around four themes: Foundations, Common Field in Practice, Community Building is Culture, and Sustainability for the Future. Contributors include artists, leaders in the field and Common Field staff and board members. The project offers an organizational timeline and a selection of resources related to Common Field’s life and work.

Common Field's social media accounts remained active until 2023, with the organization announcing in a March 22, 2023 Instagram post: 'Our website - CommonField.org - and all related links to it will remain online through April 30, 2023. Please download any materials you want to retain from the website prior to that date. Following that, all organizational archives, including the website contents, will be available at @lacarchive in Los Angeles.'

== Network and membership ==
By 2019, Common Field's network included over 300 artist-centered organizations across the United States. The coalition expanded rapidly, reaching over 700 members in 43 states by 2018, including alternative art spaces, residencies, and collectives. Its programs included peer-to-peer learning, grants, and annual convenings to support artist-led initiatives.
