= Sonya Clark =

American visual artist (born 1967)

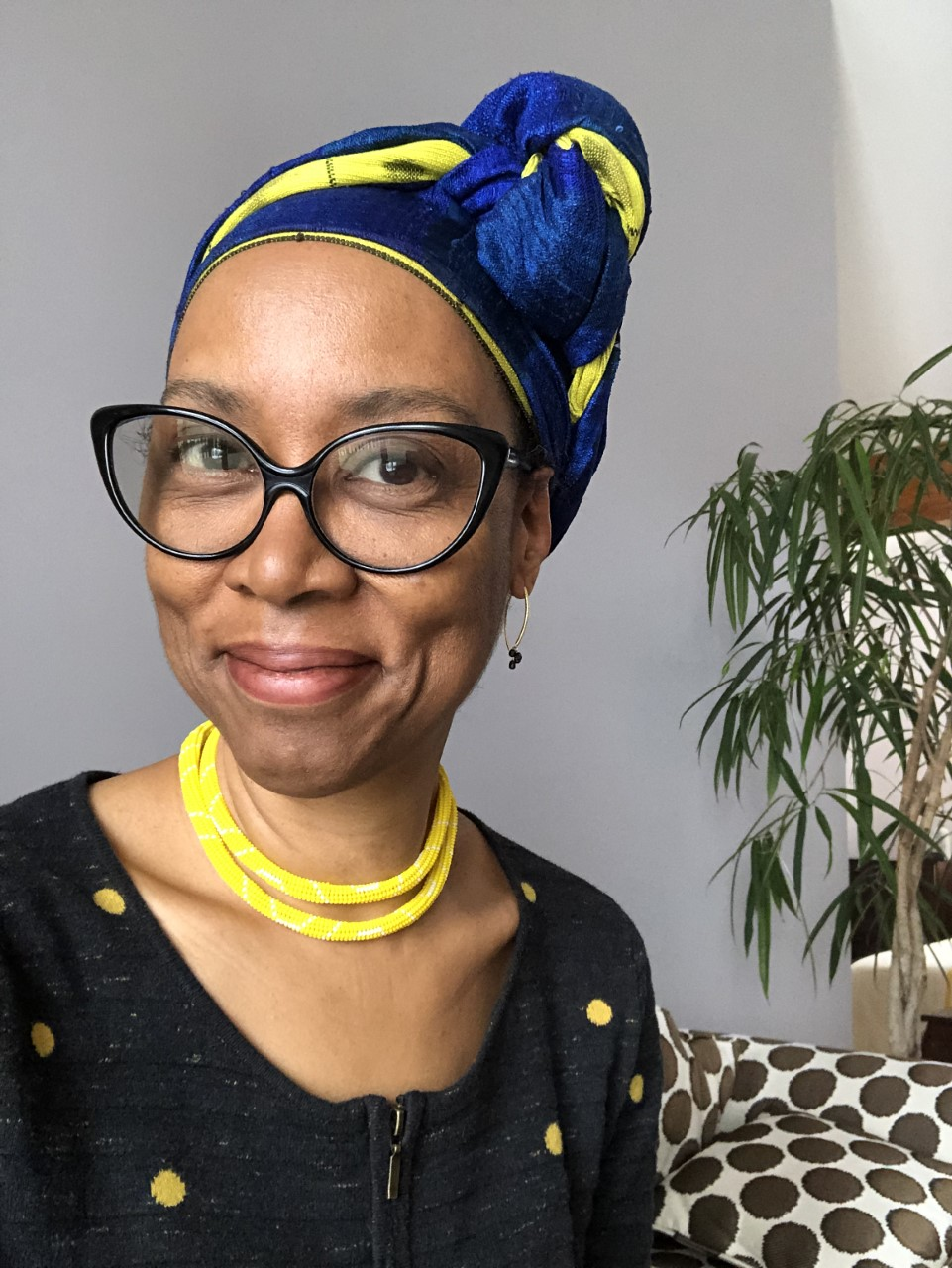
- Born: 1967 (age 58–59); Washington, D.C.
- Education: Cranbrook Academy of Art, School of the Art Institute of Chicago, Amherst College
- Occupations: Artist, glass artist
- Employers: Amherst College; University of Wisconsin–Madison (1997–2005); Virginia Commonwealth University (2006–2017)
- Awards: Anonymous Was A Woman Award (2016); Fellow of the American Craft Council (2020); Smithsonian Artist Research Fellowship (2010, 2011); Guggenheim Fellowship (visual arts, 2026, 2026)
- Website: www.sonyaclark.com

Sonya Clark (born 1967, Washington, D.C.) is an American artist of Afro-Caribbean heritage. Clark is a fiber artist known for using a variety of materials including human hair and combs to address race, culture, class, and history. Her beaded headdress assemblages and braided wig series of the late 1990s, which received critical acclaim, evoked African traditions of personal adornment and moved these common forms into the realm of personal and political expression. Although African art and her Caribbean background are important influences, Clark also builds on practices of assemblage and accumulation used by American artists such as Betye Saar and David Hammons.

== Biography ==
Clark's father was a psychiatrist from Trinidad while her mother was a nurse from Jamaica. Clark was influenced by the craftspeople in her family, including a grandmother who worked as a tailor, and a grandfather who was a furniture maker.

== Education ==
Clark graduated from the Sidwell Friends School in 1985. She then received a BA in psychology from Amherst College in 1989. She went on to receive a BFA from the School of the Art Institute of Chicago in 1993, where she studied with the artists Nick Cave (performance artist), Anne Wilson, and Joan Livingstone. In 1995, Clark received an MFA from Cranbrook Academy of Art.

In 2011, Clark was honored with Cranbrook Academy of Art's first Distinguished Mid-Career Alumni Award. She has been a recipient of four honorary doctorates. In 2015, she received an honorary doctorate from Amherst College. In 2021, she received two additional honorary doctorates from Maine College of Art in Portland, Maine and Franklin and Marshall College in Lancaster, Pennsylvania. In 2023, she was the commencement speaker and received another honorary doctorate from the School of the Art Institute of Chicago.

Clark cites professor Rowland O. Abiodun, Amherst College as an early influence in her studies of the connection between her Caribbean culture and Yoruba culture, which was further enhanced by a post-graduation trip to the Ivory Coast, where she learned to weave on a hand loom. Clark also cites Nick Cave as instrumental in furthering her investigations in fiber.

== Professional academic career ==
Clark is a professor of art in the department of Art and the History of Art at Amherst College. Between 2006 and 2017 Clark was chair of the Craft/Material Studies Department at the highly acclaimed School of the Arts at Virginia Commonwealth University in Richmond, VA. The department is ranked by U.S. News & World Report as one of the top in the nation. Clark was a Distinguished Research Fellow and in 2016 she was awarded a university-wide Distinguished Scholars Award. Prior to her appointment at Virginia Commonwealth University, she was Baldwin-Bascom Professor of Creative Arts at the University of Wisconsin-Madison, where she received tenure with distinction and an H.I. Romnes award.

== Art career ==
Much of Clark's work utilizes humble materials and objects, like combs, seed beads, coins, threads, and strands of hair. Through the use of these materials, she explores the ways people assign function and connotations to things. “Objects have personal and cultural meaning because they absorb our stories and reflect our humanity back to us. My stories, your stories, our stories are held in the object,” says Clark.

Clark is perhaps best known for artwork that honors contemporary craftspeople, like hairdressers, and notable African American figures. She has studied with craftspeople in places like Australia, Brazil, China, Côte d'Ivoire, Ghana, India, and Indonesia, where she learned about their mediums, tools, technique, and cultural associations. In her work, craft and community and intertwined; many of her projects involve participation and promote collaboration across racial, gender, and socioeconomic lines.

One of Clark's artist statements describes her work as follows:

I use craft and materials to investigate identity. Simple objects become cultural interfaces. Through them I navigate accord and discord. When trying to unravel complex issues, I am instinctively drawn to things that connect to my personal narrative as a point of departure: a comb or a strand of hair. Charged with agency, simple objects nave the mysterious ability to reflect or absorb us. I find my image, my personal story, in an object. But it is also the object's ability to act as a rhizome, the multiple ways in which it can be discovered or read by a wide audience that draws me in. To sustain my practice, I milk the object, its potential, its image, and its materiality. I manipulate the object in a formal manner to engage the viewer in conversation about collective meaning. If we unravel a cloth together, what do we learn in the process? What is the connection between combs, hair, and textiles? Can a strand of hair tell a life story or a whole cultural history? I trust that my stories, your stories, our stories are held in the object. In this way, the everyday "thing" becomes a lens through which we may better see one another. A visual vocabulary derived from object and image forms a language ranging from the vernacular to the political to the poetic."

=== Hair Craft Project ===
The Hair Craft Project is a series of photographs and canvas works that were made in collaboration between the artist and Black hairstylists, who Clark sees as practicing their own form of textile artistry. Each hairdresser demonstrated their skills and expertise by working on Clark's own hair, using her head as a canvas. The resulting hairstyle was then photographed, and paired with a complementing canvas work. On each canvas, the hairstylists duplicated the hairstyle done on Clark's hair using silk thread. This project breaks down barriers between craft and art, salon and art institutions, showing that both spaces are sites of skill, improvisation, aesthetic sensibility, and commerce.

According to Clark, "Hairdressers are my heroes. The poetry and politics of Black hair care specialists are central to my work as an artist and educator. Rooted in a rich legacy, their hands embody an ability to map a head with a comb and manipulate the fiber we grow into a complex form. These artists have mastered a craft impossible for me to take for granted." She claims, "hair is power," and, "as carrier of DNA, hair holds the essence of identity."

"I grew up braiding my hair and my sister's hair, so in one sense, like many black women, I had been preparing to be a textile artist for a very long time."

Clark further considered the hair strand as a tool for communication and worked with graphic designer Boquin Peng to create an alphabet based on the curl pattern of her hair called Twist.

=== Flag Project ===
Clark's explorations with flags began with her thesis Kente Flag Project in 1995. This work is a mixture of elements from African and Western/American culture. Clark specifically utilized Kente patterns for strength and endurance, advancement and achievement, and prosperity. The traditional Kente patterns, an African weave structure, were woven on a European loom, and combined with American flag imagery--the result being fabric that contained symbols of identity and cultural pride that reached across two cultures.

Since 2009, Clark has created serial projects surrounding the Confederate Battle Flag. She has performed Unraveling in June 2015 at the now-defunct Mixed Greens gallery in New York City and then at the Nasher Museum of Art at Duke University, in October 2016. Her presentation of the exhibit in Louisville Kentucky in 2017 "was the first performance under the [Trump] administration and since the country has found itself embroiled in debate over the presence and ramifications of Confederate imagery in the wake of the violence in Charlottesville, Virginia, this past summer." "The act is now a part of a larger movement through which state and local governments are dismantling these objects out of a sense of civic duty." During the exhibition, members of the audience are encouraged to join Clark one at a time in the unraveling of a confederate flag while she explains her vision and demonstrates how to pull the strands of the flag apart. According to Goodman, "Clark stands side-by-side by participants, shoulder-to-shoulder as they pull each strand of the flag and confront the reality it represents". In April 2018, Clark returned to her alma mater, Amherst College, to perform "Unravelling" at the Mead Art Museum.

In 2017, Clark created a hand woven linen cloth reproduction of the white dish towel used by a Confederate soldier to surrender at the Appomattox Court House on April 9, 1865. This piece is known as "Monumental Cloth (sutured)". It is the artist's hope that this flag of truce becomes as well known as the Confederate Battle Flag. Both "Unravelling" and "Monumental Cloth (sutured)" were on display at the Mead Art Museum from April 5, 2018, to July 1, 2018. Clark reproduced the Truce Flag with the intention of drawing attention back to the flag that brokered an end to the Civil War, questioning why symbols of white supremacy, such as the Confederate Battle Flag, are memorialized in favor of symbols of peace. A larger immersive outgrowth of the project "Monumental Cloth: the Flag We Should Know" was made in collaboration with and exhibited at The Fabric Workshop and Museum Her 450 square foot enlarged replica of the truce flag used for the Confederate surrender at Appomattox, Virginia, "Monumental", is in the permanent collection of the Smithsonian American Art Museum's Renwick Gallery.

=== Exhibitions, collections, and awards ===
Clark's work has been exhibited in over 500 museums and galleries in Europe, Africa, Asia, Australia, and throughout the Americas. In 2021, the National Museum of Women in the Arts in Washington, DC presented her first major comprehensive museum exhibit, "Tatter, Bristle, and Mend." In 2023-2024, a second major museum exhibition and the 60th solo show of her career, "We Are Each Other", focused on her collaborative and community engaged projects was co-organized by and traveled to the High Museum of Art, the Cranbrook Art Museum, and the Museum of Arts and Design in New York City; a smaller version was shown at the Houston Center for Contemporary Craft. Her work is in the collection of many museums including the Indianapolis Museum of Art, Delaware Art Museum, Philadelphia Museum of Art, the Madison Museum of Contemporary Art, and Memphis Brooks Museum. Her work has been favorably reviewed in journals such as Art in America, The New York Times, Sculpture, Surface Design Journal, The Los Angeles Times, Fiber Arts, New American Paintings, Philadelphia Inquirer, Italian Vogue, Hyperallergic, Mother Jones, and Huffington Post.

Sonya Clark is a Guggenheim Fellow and has received several other awards including an Anonymous Was a Woman Award, a United States Artists Fellowship,, a Trellis Foundation Stepping Stone Award, and Pollock-Krasner Award., an Art Matters Grant, a Wisconsin Arts Board Fellowship, a Virginia Museum of Fine Arts Fellowship, a Virginia Commission for the Arts Fellowship,, an 1858 Award for Contemporary Southern Art from the Gibbes Museum, the 2014 ArtPrize a Juried Grand Prize co-winner and recipient of the Juried award for Best Two-Dimensional work,

Clark has been an artist in residence at the American Academy in Rome as an Affiliated Fellow, Indigo Arts Alliance, McColl Center for Art + Innovation in 2011, the Bellagio Rockefeller Foundation in Italy, Red Gate Residency in China, a Civitella Ranieri Fellowship in Italy, and at the Smithsonian Artist Research Fellowship. Clark was inducted into the American Craft Council College of Fellows in 2020. Her work can be found in many books including Wrapped in Pride, Mami Wata, Hand + Made, The Global Africa Project, Second Lives, Manufractured, Material Girls, Contemporary Black Women Artists,Pricked, African American Art and Artists, Choosing Craft, and Master: bead-weaving Her work, Monumental, was acquired by the Smithsonian American Art Museum as part of the Renwick Gallery's 50th Anniversary Campaign. In 2023, Clark's work was featured in the group show and accompanying publication Spirit in the Land, organized and displayed by the Nasher Museum of Art at Duke University, which is also traveling to the Pérez Art Museum Miami.

== Exhibition history ==
- 2023: Sonya Clark: We Are Each Other Cranbrook Art Museum, June 17 –September 24
- 2021: Sonya Clark: Tatter, Bristle, and Mend, National Museum of Women in the Arts, March 3 – June 28
- 2019: Monumental Cloth: the flag we should know, Fabric Workshop and Museum, March 29 – August 4, 2019
- 2019: Sonya Clark: Hair|Goods, An Homage to Madam CJ Walker, Goya Contemporary Gallery, January 25 - March 30, 2019
- 2017: Oaths and Epithets: Works by Sonya Clark, Contemporary Craft, April 12 – August 19, 2017
- 2015: Loving After Lifetimes of All This, The Center for Craft, Creativity & Design, January 30 – May 23, 2015
- 2008: Sonya Clark: Loose Strands, Tight Knots, Walters Art Museum, June 28 – September 2, 2008

== Published works ==
- Haystack Monograph Series No. 17, 2004: Craft and Design. "Hand-me-downs: Our Stories held in Objects, Materials and Processes."
- Surface Design, Fall 2003. "In Review: Nick Sargent."
- Surface Design, Summer 2000. "Beneath Pattern: Investigating Symmetry."
- Ornament, Spring 1997. "Sculptural Headdresses."
- The Hair Craft Project: Sonya Clark, eds. Melissa Anderson, Sonya Clark, Meg Roberts and Leigh Suggs, Exhibition Catalogue, 2015
