= Tim Barrett =

Tim Barrett may refer to:

- Tim Barrett (academic), Professor of East Asian History at SOAS, University of London,
- Tim Barrett (actor) (1929–1990), English actor
- Tim Barrett (admiral) (born 1959), senior Australian naval officer
- Tim Barrett (triple jumper) (born 1948), Bahamian former triple jumper
- Tim Barrett (baseball) (born 1961), former Major League Baseball pitcher
- Tim Barrett, drummer with the band Disciple
- Timothy Barrett (papermaker), American papermaker
