= Freckelton =

Freckelton is the surname of the following people:

- Grant Freckelton, American visual effects artist, art director and production designer
- Ian Freckelton, Australian lawyer
- Sondra Freckelton (1936–2019), American sculptor and watercolorist

== See also ==
- Freckleton, a village and civil parish in Lancashire, England
