= Frederick F. Fursman =

American artist, b. 1943)

- Born: Frederick Frary Fursman; February 15, 1874; El Paso, Illinois
- Died: May 12, 1943 (aged 69); Saugatuck, Michigan
- Education: J. Francis Smith Academy for Art, Chicago (1900-1901); Art Institute of Chicago Art School (1901-1906); Académie de la Grande Chaumière, Académie Julian, Paris (1906-1909)
- Known for: impressionist painter, educator
- Spouse(s): Georgia Brown (d. 1898); Ida Luella Morton (m. 1902)

Frederick Frary Fursman (nicknamed "Fursie") (February 15, 1874 – May 12, 1943) was an American impressionist painter and educator who co-founded the Saugatuck Summer School of Painting (known today as the Ox-Bow School of Art and Artists' Residency, Michigan and co-directed or directed it for 30 years.

== Career ==
Fursman was born in El Paso, Illinois. He studied art in Chicago (1900-1906) and in France at the Académie de la Grande Chaumière and with Jean Paul Laurens at the Académie Julian, Paris (1906–1909). He exhibited his paintings at the Salon Société des Artistes Français in Paris (1908-1909).

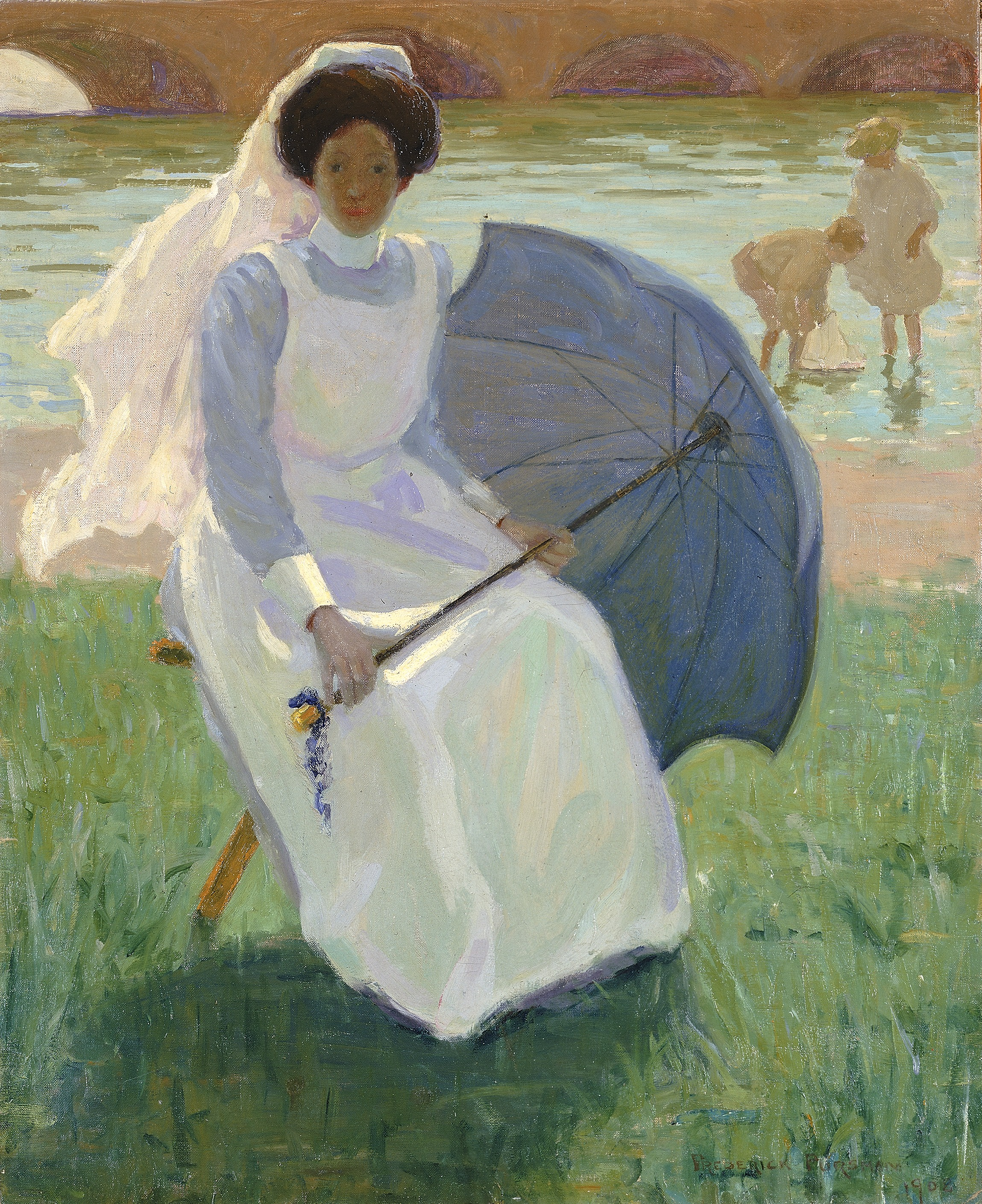
Woman with Green Parasol SAAM-1977.41 1

Returning to Chicago in 1909, he found work teaching at the Art Institute of Chicago and in 1910 (and for many times thereafter) exhibited there and at the Pennsylvania Academy of the Fine Arts. With Walter Marshall Clute, he started the Summer School of Painting at Saugatuck which he co-directed or directed (1915-1943), taught elsewhere in the winter and helped found the Saugatuck Art Association (1931). He died in Saugatuck in 1943.

Fursman showed his paintings often at the Art Institute of Chicago. A retrospective titled Frederick Frary Fursman: A Rediscovered Impressionist was held at the Milwaukee Art Museum at the University of Wisconsin (1931) and his work was included in The Color of Modernism, The American Fauves which had a catalogue with an essay by William H. Gerdts at the Hollis Taggart Galleries in New York (1997). The Richard Norton Gallery in Chicago, Illinois held a solo exhibition of Fursman's work titled Frederick Frary Fursman: The Colors of Fauvism in 2018.

== Work ==
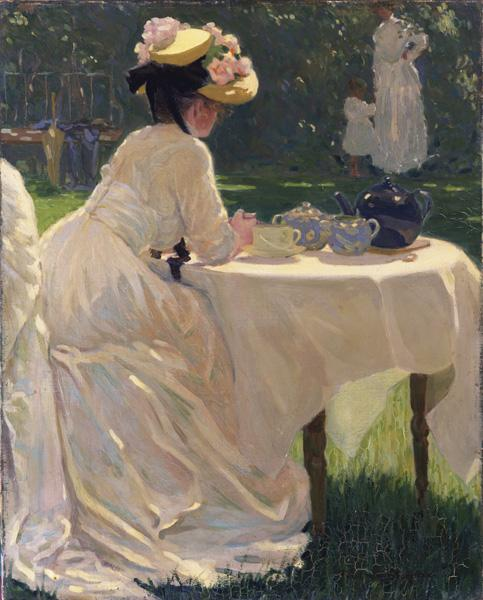
In the Garden

Fursman's landscapes and figures painted in the open air are characterized by pure, unblended color and loose brushwork. He is described as an American Impressionist or an American Fauve. His work is in the public collections of the Smithsonian American Art Museum, and the Toledo Museum of Art. His work also is in the Christine M. Schwartz Collection of Chicago art work. Fursman's work is represented by the Richard Norton Gallery, Chicago, Illinois.
