= Joan Livingstone =

American contemporary artist, educator, curator and author

- Born: 1948 (age 77–78); Portland, Oregon
- Education: MFA Cranbrook Academy of Art; BFA Portland State University

Joan Livingstone (born 1948) is an American contemporary artist, educator, curator, and author based in Chicago. She creates sculptural objects, installations, prints, and collages that reference the human body and bodily experience.

== Education ==
Livingstone earned a bachelor of arts degree from Portland State University in 1972, followed by a master of fine arts degree from Cranbrook Academy of Art. She was a stage and graphic designer at the Portland Shakespeare Company from 1969 to 1972.

== Career ==
=== Artist ===
Livingstone's work often abstractly reflects the human body, especially as is related to the history of women artists. In her early work, she often used suture-stitch to create visceral forms out of industrial felt that she then hardened with epoxy resins. Her more recent work incorporates found objects, metallic leaf, and hand-made paper. Her later fiber arts work was larger in scale and took on more conceptual meaning.

Livingstone has held solo exhibitions at the John Michael Kohler Arts Center, Alfred University. Her work is held in the permanent collections of:

- The Art Institute of Chicago, Illinois
- Boise Museum of Art, Idaho
- Honolulu Museum of Art, Honolulu, Hawaii
- Cranbrook Academy of Art, Bloomfield Hills, Michigan
- Dennos Museum Center, Traverse City, Michigan
- Detroit Institute of Arts, Detroit, Michigan
- Metropolitan Museum of Art, New York, New York
- Museum of Contemporary Art, Chicago, Illinois
- Northern Illinois University Art Museum, DeKalb, Illinois
- Racine Art Museum, Racine, Wisconsin
- Portland Art Museum, Portland, Oregon
- Robert L. Pfannebecker Collection, Lancaster, Pennsylvania

Livingstone has received a number of awards for her work, including:

- Chairman's Award, School of the Art Institute of Chicago (2014)
- American Craft Council Fellowship (2001)
- Illinois Arts Council Artist Fellowship (2000, 1989, 1986)
- Virginia A. Groot Foundation, Illinois, Individual Artist Grant (1998)
- Faculty Enrichment Grant, School of the Art Institute of Chicago (1984, 1988,1989, 1992, 1993, 1994, 1997)
- National Endowment for the Arts, Individual Artist Fellowship (1979, 1986, 1993)
- The Louis Comfort Tiffany Foundation Artist's Fellowship (catalog) (1990)
- The George A. and Eliza Gardner Howard Foundation Artist's Fellowship, Brown University, RI (1989)

=== Educator ===
Livingstone has worked as an educator at several institutions, including the Kansas City Art Institute, Cranbrook Academy of Art, and the School of the Art Institute of Chicago. Beginning in 1983, she held several positions at SAIC, including Dean of Undergraduate studies and professor emerita in the Department of Fiber and Material Studies.

=== Writer ===
In 2007, Livingstone, with John Ploof, co-edited an anthology, The Object of Labor: Art, Cloth, and Cultural Production. The book includes essays and artist pages examining the effect of globalization on practices and depictions of labor in the arts through the lens of textile production.

== Select exhibitions ==
2015

- "Oddments," John Michael Kohler Arts Center, Sheboygan, WI
- "marvels and oddment(s)," Clough-Hanson Gallery, Rhodes College, Memphis, Tennessee

2006-7

- “Joan Livingstone: Membranes, Margins, Disruptions,” traveling exhibition, Fosdick Nelson Gallery, Alfred University, NY; Dorothy Uber Bryan Gallery, Bowling Green State University, Ohio; Jack Olson Gallery, Northern Illinois University, DeKalb, IL

2005

- “Re/Locations,” MNGallery, Chicago, IL

2004

- "Migrations," Laura Russo Gallery, Portland, OR

2002

- "Visual Perspectives: 14 Years of the Virginia A. Groot Awards," Groot Foundation Space, Chicago
- "In the Material World," Evanston Art Center, Evanston, IL (4 One Person Exhibitions)

2000

- "Jane Lackey, Joan Livingstone," Roy Boyd Gallery, Chicago, Illinois

1999

- "Embodiment," Arkansas Arts Center, Little Rock, AR

1998

- "Limits of Capacity," Dennos Museum Center, Traverse City, MI
- "Sum Greater Than the Parts: Contemporary Sculpture," Rockford Museum of Art, Rockford, IL

1997

- "resistSTANCES," Sybaris Gallery, Royal Oak, MI (also 1994, 1992)
- "Joan Livingstone: Sculpture, Prints and Collages, 1990-1997," Jack Olson Gallery, NIU Art Museum, Northern Illinois University, DeKalb, IL
- "Assemblage," Center Galleries, Center for Creative Studies, Detroit

1996

- "Collages, Prints, Sculpture," Cabell Center for the Arts, The Catlin Gable School, Portland, OR

1995

- "Sculpture," Laura Russo Gallery, Portland, OR "Chicago Prints," Shinsegae Gallery, Seoul, Korea (catalog)

1992

- "Organic Sensibilities," The Center Galleries, Center for Creative Studies, Detroit, MI
- "Few and Far Between," Rockford Art Museum, Rockford, IL

1990

- "Joan Livingstone: New Sculpture," Artemisia Gallery, Chicago (Also 1988)

1985

- "Sculpture Textile," 12th Biennale Internationale de la Tapissierie, Musee Cantonal des Beaux-Arts, Palais de Rumine, Lausanne, Switzerland 1984
- "American Fiber: A New Aesthetic, Diverse Works," Houston, TX

1982

- "Dimensions: Felt," Charles and Emma Frye Art Museum, Seattle, WA

== Publications ==
2015

- Susan Snodgrass, “Toward Textiles,” Textile: Cloth and Culture, Vol. 13, Issue 3, pp. 306–313 (http://dx.doi.org/10.1080/14759756.2015.1102489).
- Joel Parsons, marvels & oddment[s], Clough-Hanson Gallery, Rhodes College, Memphis, TN (exhibition catalog).
- Eileen Townsend, Joan Livingstone's “Marvels and Oddments,” Memphis Flyer, November 23, 2015.
- Karen Patterson, “Joan Livingstone: Oddment[s],” Toward Textiles (on-line catalog), John Michael Kohler Arts Center, Sheboygan, WI.

2011

- Nadine Fiedler, “Joan Livingstone: Artist and Art Educator,” The Caller, Summer, Portland, OR.

2010

- Janet Koplos, Bruce Metcalf, eds., Makers, Chapel Hill, NC: The University of North Carolina Press, pp, 428-429.

2008

- Polly Ulrich, “Corporeal Dynamics,” Surface Design Journal, Vol. 32, No. 2, Winter, pp. 26–31.

2007

- Joan Livingstone, John Ploof, eds., The Object of Labor: Critical Perspectives on Art, Cloth, and Cultural Production, Boston: MIT and Chicago: SAIC Press.
- Grace Glueck, “Fun with Studio Crafts: When the traditional gets quirky,” New York Times Art Review, Friday, January 12, 2007.
- Mary Gustaitis-Beyer, “Turning Home at Trackhouse,” ArtBlog, June.
- Shannon Stratton, “Migrations,” Laura Russo Gallery, Portland, OR.

2006

- Membranes•Margins•Disruptions (exhibition catalog: essays by Judith Leemann, Shannon Stratton; Sharon McConnell, curator), Alfred, NY: Fosdick-Nelson Gallery, School of Art and Design, Alfred University.

2003

- Victor Cassidy, “Focus: Joan Livingstone,” Sculpture Magazine, April.
- Sunita Patterson. “Is Fiber’s Foundation Firm?” Fiberarts Magazine, Vol. 30, No. 2, Sept/Oct.

2002

- Gerry Craig, James Elkins, James Yood, Portfolio Collection Vol 10: Joan Livingstone, Winchester, England: Telos Art Publishing.
- John Brunetti, In The Material World, exhibition catalog, Evanston Art Center, IL.

2001

- Otto G. Ocvrik ... [et al.], Art Fundamentals: Theory & Practice, Ninth Edition (NY:McGraw-Hill) p. 224
- Ruth Lopez, “Livingstone’s Body of Work,” Chicago Tribune, December 30 .

2000

- Jenni Sorkin, “Jane Lackey/Joan Livingstone,” New Art Examiner.

1999

- James Elkins, Pictures of the Body: Pain and Metamorphosis, CA: Stanford University Press, pp. 148–149.

1998

- Gerry Craig, “Reviews: Joan Livingstone,” Sculpture, Vol. 17, No. 7, September.
- Jaqueline Shinners, Limits of Capacity, exhibition catalog, Dennos Museum Center, Traverse City, MI.
- Gerry Craig, “Reviews: resistSTANCEs,” Fiberarts Magazine, Vol. 25, No. 1, Summer.
- Mark Newport, “The Masculine in Fiber,” Surface Design Journal, Vol. 22, No. 3, Spring.

1997

- Joyce Fernandes, Joan Livingstone, exhibition catalog, Northern Illinois University Art Museum, DeKalb, IL.

1996

- Joan Livingstone and Anne Wilson, The Presence of Touch, exhibition catalog, SAIC Galleries, The School of the Art Institute of Chicago, IL.

1995

- Gerry Craig, “Imagination and Sensation,” Fiberarts Magazine, Vol. 22, No. 3, Nov/Dec.
- Mark Newport, “Points of View,” Fiberarts Magazine, Vol. 21, No. 4, Jan/Feb.

1994

- Layne Goldsmith, “On Marking Progress in Creative Discovery,” Surface Design Journal, Vol 19, No 1 Fall.
- Sandy Harthorn, Fabricated Nature, exhibition catalog, Boise Museum of Art, ID.

1993

- James Yood, “A Sequence of Forms,” The New Art Examiner.
- Elizabeth Broadrup, “Re-envisioning Craft,” Macquette, International Sculpture Center, November.

1992

- John Brunetti, “Joan Livingstone,” The New Art Examiner, December.
- Alice Thorson, “Modern concerns inspire dramatic modern sculpture,” The Kansas City Star Sunday Art Section, February 9.
- Margo (Shermeta) Mensing, International Contemporary Fiber Art: Now, exhibition catalog, Sonje Museum of Contemporary Art, South Korea.
- W. Logan Fry, “Multiple Directions: Contemporary Works in Felt,” Fiberarts Magazine, March/April.

1991

- Kathryn Hixson, “Chicago in Review: Joan Livingstone,” Arts Magazine, February.
- Margo Shermeta, “Contemporary Sculpture: A Question of Elegance,” Fiberarts Magazine, Vol 18, No 1.
- Carol Dickinson, “Crossovers: Exploiting the Possibilities,” Fiberarts Magazine, Summer.
- Pamela Scheinman, “New Ends: The Medium as Message,” Fiberarts Magazine.

1990

- Buzz Spector, “Chicago: Joan Livingstone,” Art Issues, #15.

1989

- Devin Golden, “Armor,” The New Art Examiner, September.

1988

- David McCracken, “Gallery Scene: Expression is fiber artists’ common thread,” The Chicago Tribune Friday Section, July 29.
- Jeff Abell, “Imagining Form,” The New Art Examiner, Vol 15, No 7, April.

1985

- Diane and Elmer Taylor, “Twelfth International Biennial of Tapestry,” Fiberarts Magazine, Nov/Dec.

1981

- Jack Larsen and Mildred Constantine, editors. The Art Fabric: Mainstream, New York: Van Nostrand Reinhold.

1980

- Winifred Lutz, “Felting,” American Craft Magazine, Aug/Sept, cover, pp 2–9.
- Patricia Malarcher, “Joan Livingstone,” Fiberarts Magazine, July/Aug. March.
- Beverly Gordon, Feltmaking, New York: Watson-Guptill Publications.
- Victoria Kirsch Melcher, “Kansas City: Sunspots and Night Ladders,” Art News, Nov.
- Donald Hoffman, “Symbolic Emblems Luminous,” The Kansas City Star, Feb. 17.

== Additional sources ==
- Adrian, Dennis (1993) "Joan Livingstone," American Craft Magazine, Vol. 53, Issue 3, June–July 1993, pp 40–45. ISSN 0194-8008
