= Walter Marshall Clute =

Walter Marshall Clute (January 9, 1870 - February 13, 1915) was an American painter and educator who co-founded the Saugatuck Summer School of Painting in 1914 (known today as Ox-Bow School of Art and Artists' Residency in Saugatuck, Michigan) with artist and educator Frederick Fursman.

== Career ==
Clute was a faculty member at the School of the Art Institute of Chicago and a member of both the Chicago Society of Artists and the Palette and Chisel Club. Clute participated in exhibitions at various institutions across the United States including the The Art Institute of Chicago, The Detroit Institute of Arts, and the City Museum in St. Louis, Missouri. His paintings can be found in the collections of the Union League Club of Chicago. He was at one time an illustrator for the Chicago Daily News and the war correspondent for that paper in Cuba.

== Personal life and death ==
Clute Married Beulah Mitchell, a poster artist and designer of book covers, on December 26, 1900 in Decatur, Illinois. Together they had a daughter, Marjorie Medora Clute, who would become the subject in many of Clute's paintings

Clute passed away on February 13, 1915 of heart failure in North Cucamonga, California, at the age of 45.
