= Molly Zuckerman-Hartung =

American painter and writer

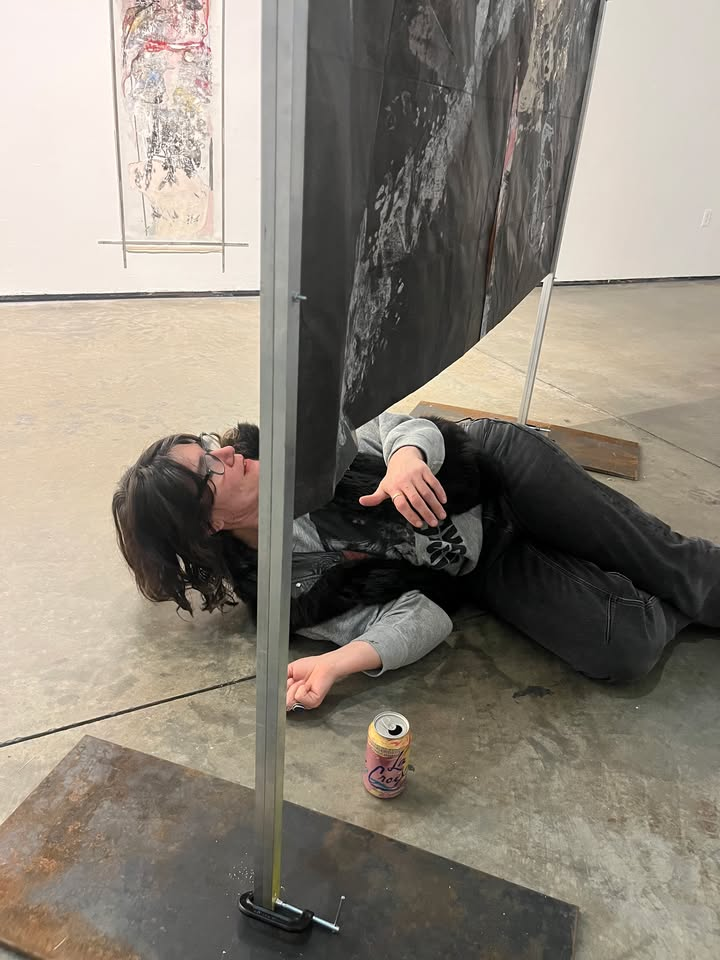
- Born: 1975 (age 50–51); Los Gatos, California, U.S.
- Education: School of the Art Institute of Chicago; Evergreen State College
- Occupations: Artist, critic
- Employer: Yale School of Art
- Awards: Louis Comfort Tiffany; Robert Rauschenberg Residency
- Website: Molly Zuckerman-Hartung

Molly Zuckerman-Hartung, Q: You and what Army? A: Both of them!, dye, latex, oil and enamel and on canvas and sewn velvet, 63" x 57", 2020.

Molly Zuckerman-Hartung (born 1975) is a contemporary American painter and writer. She creates abstract, process-based works whose experiments with disparate materials and methods such as collage, sewing and assemblage, push beyond traditional notions of painting and verge on the sculptural. Critics characterize her approach as dialectical—both carefully considered and provisional—and identify in the work a handmade, punk culture-like rejection of conventional taste and consistency that is paired with a deep regard for the diversity and history of painting. Zuckerman-Hartung's paintings and wall pieces employ a diverse visual language of gesture and mark-making that partakes in and also deconstructs the conceptual frameworks of modernist practices. New York Times critic Martha Schwendener described them as "a firestorm of techniques and effects: bleaching, dyeing, staining and sewing linen, silk and humble dropcloths." Though mostly abstract, Zuckerman-Hartung's work engages the broader world through collaged imagery and text, cultural and aesthetic references, and suggestive titles that can serve as anchors.

Zuckerman-Hartung has exhibited at venues including the Whitney Museum, Walker Art Center, Museum of Contemporary Art, Chicago (MCA), MOCA Cleveland, Blaffer Art Museum and Indianapolis Contemporary. Her work belongs to the collections of the Walker Art Center, MCA Chicago, Berkeley Art Museum and Pacific Film Archive and Carnegie Museum of Art, among others. She is a critic at the Yale School of Art and Rhode Island School of Design (RISD).

== Early life and career ==
Zuckerman-Hartung was born in Los Gatos, California in 1975 and grew up in Olympia, Washington. In her youth, she was involved in the area's riot grrrl community, a movement combining feminism, punk subculture and activism that has continued to influence her art practice and thought. In 2000, she was one of the original organizers of the non-profit music and art festival, Ladyfest, which in various iterations has had a global reach in subsequent years.

Molly Zuckerman-Hartung, Readymade Mood, graphite, hardware, T-shirt and pinwheel on linen, 28" x 20", 2011.

Zuckerman-Hartung earned a BA in French language, literature and philosophy from Evergreen State College in Olympia 1998, before relocating to Chicago in 2004 to study at the School of the Art Institute of Chicago (SAIC). She remained in Chicago for a decade, earning an MFA in 2007 while also co-founding an artist-run alternative space called Julius Caesar with Dana DeGiulio, Diego Leclery, Colby Shaft and Hans Peter Sundquist. During this period she had solo exhibitions at the Rowley Kennerk Gallery, Julius Caesar, Corbett vs. Dempsey and the MCA in Chicago, and at John Connelly Presents and Anna Kustera Gallery in New York, among other venues. She appeared in the Whitney Biennial in 2014. In 2015, Zuckerman-Hartung moved to New York City, and subsequently to Connecticut.

== Work and reception ==
Critics described Zuckerman-Hartung's early paintings as accretions of ideas built off a dense modernist heritage, diverse materials and actions (cutting, collaging, assembling, staining) that often extended beyond the picture plane and frame (e.g., Readymade Mood, 2011)." In a 2008 Artforum review of Zuckerman-Hartung's show at Julius Caesar, Michelle Grabner characterized the work as a "project of rethinking abstraction … as an infinite field of potentials; contrary to any conception of abstraction as an endgame of absences and negations, her work affirms a hysterical, endless rallying of imaginative combinations and assemblages."

Reviews described Zuckerman-Hartung's subsequent work (e.g., at Corbett vs. Dempsey, 2012 and 2014) as playful, brash, fragmented, and personal but not revelatory, while identifying a shift toward greater social engagement through the incorporation of photographic imagery and text. For example, paintings such as Venomous, with Four Pairs of Arms (2008–11) mixed her characteristic abstract mark-making and tears with collaged and painted-over pornographic imagery, bringing interests in writing, critical theory, feminism, punk aesthetics and sexuality to the forefront. In pieces like Calif. (2013) and Notley (her 2014 Whitney Biennial work referencing the poet Alice Notley), Zuckerman-Hartung began incorporating sewn fabric and distressed dropcloth fragments, creating looser, more vibrant imagery and surfaces that were intentionally less taut and less heavily worked.

In the shows "Queen" (2016, Lyles & King, with Dana DeGiulio), "Learning Artist" (Rachel Uffner Gallery, 2017) and "Flim-Flam" (Corbett vs. Dempsey, 2021), Zuckerman-Hartung presented works with poetic, playful titles whose collaged imagery and ephemera, loosely structured grids and fluid references challenged fixed notions of art and art history, language and the female body. The former show took a subtle approach to gender, employing surfaces of scrawled words and numbers, phallic drips and graffiti, pours, stains and shapes made by removing pigment with bleach, with absences becoming form (e.g., How Much Such a Little Moon, 2015). Hyperallergic's Ashton Cooper remarked, "Zuckerman-Hartung's pieces made from patchworks of sewn fabric confront these 'postures' of the past and in doing so manage to invoke and undo the history of AbEx, women’s work, and the grid as it relates to painting." New City called the work in "Flim-Flam" concise and balanced between repetition and improvisation, with staccato rhythms "brimming with off-kilter adjacency."

Molly Zuckerman-Hartung, Notley, latex house paint, enamel and spray paint on dropcloth (hinged, in two attached parts), 96" x 132", 2013.

Zuckerman-Hartung's exhibition “Menopause Recalls Puberty (M.R.P.)" (Below Grand, 2024) combined an installation with gestural, largely abstract paintings, the titles—of the show and individual works—speaking to the complexity of womanhood and emotional states of innocence, shame, confidence and regret. The exhibition was anchored by the installation (2019-2024), an archive-like grid of 500 photographs capturing artworks, experiments, sketches, text, and more, each with a pea glued to it. New York Times critic Jillian Steinhauer called the work "a portrait not of the artist herself but of her process of art making … [which] discloses just enough to create a sense of mysterious intimacy; it’s personal without being confessional."

== Writing and teaching ==
In addition to her artwork, Zuckerman-Hartung is known for her writing and artist lectures given throughout the US. Her writing has appeared in catalogues for artists Michelle Grabner, Howardena Pindell and Carrie Schneider, a collection of essays on Susan Sontag, and in The Brooklyn Rail, among other publications. Her work, "The 95 Theses on Painting" (2012), is a manifesto-like text widely used in university painting courses in the US.

Zuckerman-Hartung is an associate professor at UCLA's Department of Art. She was a senior critic in painting and printmaking at the Yale School of Art and a critic in painting at RISD; she has been a faculty member at Yale since 2015. She has also taught at the School of the Art Institute of Chicago and at Northwestern University in the department of art theory and practice.

== Recognition ==
Zuckerman-Hartung's work belongs to the public art collections of the Berkeley Art Museum, Carnegie Museum of Art, DePaul Art Museum, Frye Art Museum, Museum of Contemporary Art Chicago, University of Chicago Booth School of Business, and Walker Art Center.

She was awarded a Louis Comfort Tiffany Foundation award in 2013 and has received artist residencies from Ox-Bow, the Robert Rauschenberg Foundation, Yaddo and the University of New Mexico, among other recognition. In 2021, the Blaffer Art Museum in Houston presented a survey of Zuckerman-Hartung's work accompanied by a monograph, titled Comic Relief.
