= Threewalls =

- Founded: 2003
- Founder: Shannon Stratton, Jonathan Rhodes, Sonia Yoon, Jeff M. Ward, Ruba Katrib, and Ivo Gasparotto
- Legal status: 501(c)3 non-profit organization
- Headquarters: Chicago, IL
- Executive Director: Jeffreen M. Hayes
- Website: https://three-walls.org/

Threewalls is a nonprofit, Black-led, and Black feminist art gallery that highlights contemporary art practices in Chicago, Illinois. Since 2003, Threewalls has continued to build community through art, with a focus on work rooted in personal and lived experiences. They challenge traditional contemporary arts by using the various neighborhood locations as their exhibits as well as providing programs that supports its artist who are a part of ALAANA (African, Latinx, Asian, Arab, Native American), a historically excluded group from financial, curatorial, and programmatic support. As part of their identities, their programs such as In-Session and Dreaming Circles provide artists opportunities to develop through research help, sourcing, and awareness initiatives that ultimately bring their communities closer.

Threewalls also serves as a significant supporter for the entire Chicago art community, securing and distributing millions in grants from major philanthropic organizations such as the Surdna Foundation, the Andy Warhol Foundation for the Visual Arts, and the Reva & David Logan foundation.

== History ==
Threewalls was founded in 2003 by Shannon Stratton, Jonathan Rhodes, Sonia Yoon, Jeff M. Ward, Ruba Katrib, and Ivo Gasparotto, a group of graduates from the School of the Art Institute of Chicago (SAIC). The founders used their experience in artistry and gallery management to create a community-oriented network. This ultimately led the organization to pursue its mission of raising awareness of Chicago's local art community and providing emerging artists with opportunities to grow within the city.

In 2011, Threewalls started the Community-Supported Art (CSA) program, adapting the Community-Supported Agriculture model to commission and distribute original works by local Chicago artists.

In 2015, director Shannon Stratton left Threewalls and became chief curator at the Museum of Arts and Design in New York. Dr. Jeffreen Hayes subsequently took over as executive director of Threewalls.

Rising Rent in Chicago’s West Loop

As the West Loop quickly became a desirable neighborhood in early 2016, an influx of high-end offices and restaurants caused rent prices in the neighborhood to rise sharply, placing many established galleries from the area under significant financial strain. Among those affected was Threewalls, which had operated in the West Loop for twelve years as an established hub for art exhibitions and young artists alike. In addition to leaving their West Loop gallery, Threewalls laid off two of its staff members to cut costs.

== Mission ==
Threewalls centers itself on Black feminist principles and the support of artists from historically segregated communities, promoting artistic practices based on lived experiences, connection, community and advocacy. The organization does so by maintaining a presence in its neighborhood and utilizing community spaces and non-traditional venues alike to host programs and present artwork.

In an interview with The Surdna Foundation, Executive Director Dr. Jeffreen Hayes stated "The Fellows are 'of community' rather than just 'in community'. The projects are 'reciprocal'. It's not that you are coming in and you are telling a community about themselves, but you are actually there and you are listening."

In 2024, Threewalls released a report titled “From Living to Thriving,” pledging their commitment to paying artists in the organization fairly. The report argues that artists should receive a living and thriving wage as opposed to a minimal one, with an emphasis on compensating what it calls "invisible labor", such as planning and behind-the-scenes work.

== Programs ==
The Community-Supported Art (CSA) program, launched in 2011, adapted the Community-Supported Agriculture model to the art world. Subscribers paid $350 for a share and received six pieces of art delivered every two weeks over a span of eight months. Threewalls allowed twelve artists to produce 50 editions of one of their art pieces, distributing 100 shares to the public and the remainder to shareholders.

Threewalls social justice program RaD Lab+Outside the Walls was founded in 2017 and aims to address inequities in funding for ALAANA-identifying artists. The program allows recipients to spend a year researching, developing, and testing an idea grounded in lived experience. The resulting exhibition models are installed throughout various Chicago neighborhoods, making them accessible to the community. In addition, the program provides technical and creative assistance, including digital coaching sessions and counseling workshops for artists. This also helps secure public spaces for art displays and is open to collaborations with community members. In 2019 the RaD Lab+Outside program received additional funding from the Surdna Foundation, which pledged $300,000 annually for three years.

Internal Programs

In-Session: Launched as part of their THAWALLS series, In-Session is a mixed lecture featuring academic reading, community readings, and live performance. The program is intended to be different from traditional lectures by integrating curated arts with performers from various disciplines including music, dance, and literature. In 2017, their "In-session 2" performance featured artists "Brother El" and "Damon Green" at Navy Pier, where the audience participated in a shared text reading through dialogue and performance.

Dreaming Circles: This program provides communal gatherings focused on collective dreaming and restorative practices. In 2023, Threewalls celebrated their 20th anniversary by Call-and-Response: Dreaming of a Future, hosted by Wisdom Baty. The program features slow movement of dreaming, conversations of sharing and artists involvement on the Chicago's South Side.

== Recognition and Impact ==
In 2019, Threewalls received $1.2 million from the Surdna Foundation, of which they donated $300,000 each year for three years. These were dedicated to funding projects by artists who identify as ALAANA in Chicago. Additionally, twelve recipients were given $25,000 to focus on community-based projects centered around racial injustice.

In 2020 the Andy Warhol Foundation for the Visual Arts donated $100,000 to the organization as a part of a multi-year program support initiative, providing financial stability to organizations over a two-year period.

In 2024, the Reva & David Logan Foundation—a foundation that supports the arts, journalism, social justice, and community organization programs—granted over $100,000 to Threewalls, spanning two years and intended to support the organization's general operations.

Also in 2024, the wage policy “From Living to Thriving” was developed in collaboration with Culture/Math. Over three years, the two worked together to give fair compensation to artists within the organizations. The collaboration received support from the Illinois Arts Council Agency and the Builders Initiative.

During the 2020 COVID-19 pandemic, Threewalls awarded nine local artists and creatives of color $32,000 each to help advance racial equity through their artistic and creative practices. The award was raised from the previous $25,000 per artist in response to the increased need caused by the pandemic.

== Notable Exhibitions & Artists ==
Amina Ross is a Chicago-based interdisciplinary artist from Threewalls. They have worked in videomaking, installation, and performance throughout the city. Amina's work explores their Black identity and intimacy as they aim to reclaim their body. Many of their exhibitions include working in education and public programs at the School of the Art Institute of Chicago and the Museum of Contemporary Art. In 2019, Ross was a Newcity recipient and was named a “Breakout Artist.” They have completed multiple residencies, including the Arts + Public Life residency at the University of Chicago. In addition, Ross has curated events and projects within the community. Most recently, they led the festival ECLIPSING, which focuses on healing and discussion.

Jorge Félix is an Afro-Boricua multidisciplinary artist and community curator based in Chicago, and a 2022 RaD Lab+Outside the Walls fellow. Félix is known for his "Body Construction" painting installations, in which he shapes canvas into reliefs, sculptures, and three-dimensional forms or installations. His community-based project "Sofrito Conversations" brought together various community leaders, artists, and neighbors around shared cooking traditions as a way to facilitate conversations about cultural identity and neighborhood issues in Chicago's Hermosa community. Additionally, his work has been exhibited at the Museum of Contemporary Art Chicago.
