= Courtney Fink =

American arts advocate, curator, writer

Courtney Fink is an American organizer, arts advocate, curator and writer. She is the co-founder and Director of Common Field, a national network of art spaces and projects. Courtney Fink currently serves as a board member for the Andy Warhol Foundation for the Visual Arts.

From 2003 to 2015 she served as the executive director of Southern Exposure, a non-profit alternative art space in San Francisco, California. While at Southern Exposure she pioneered the Alternative Exposure granting program which distributed funds to alternative spaces and artists projects throughout San Francisco and the Bay Area.

Courtney Fink holds a B.A. degree in art history and fine arts from Skidmore College in Saratoga Springs, New York.
