= Southern Exposure (art space) =

Coordinates: 37.768040°N 122.422740°W

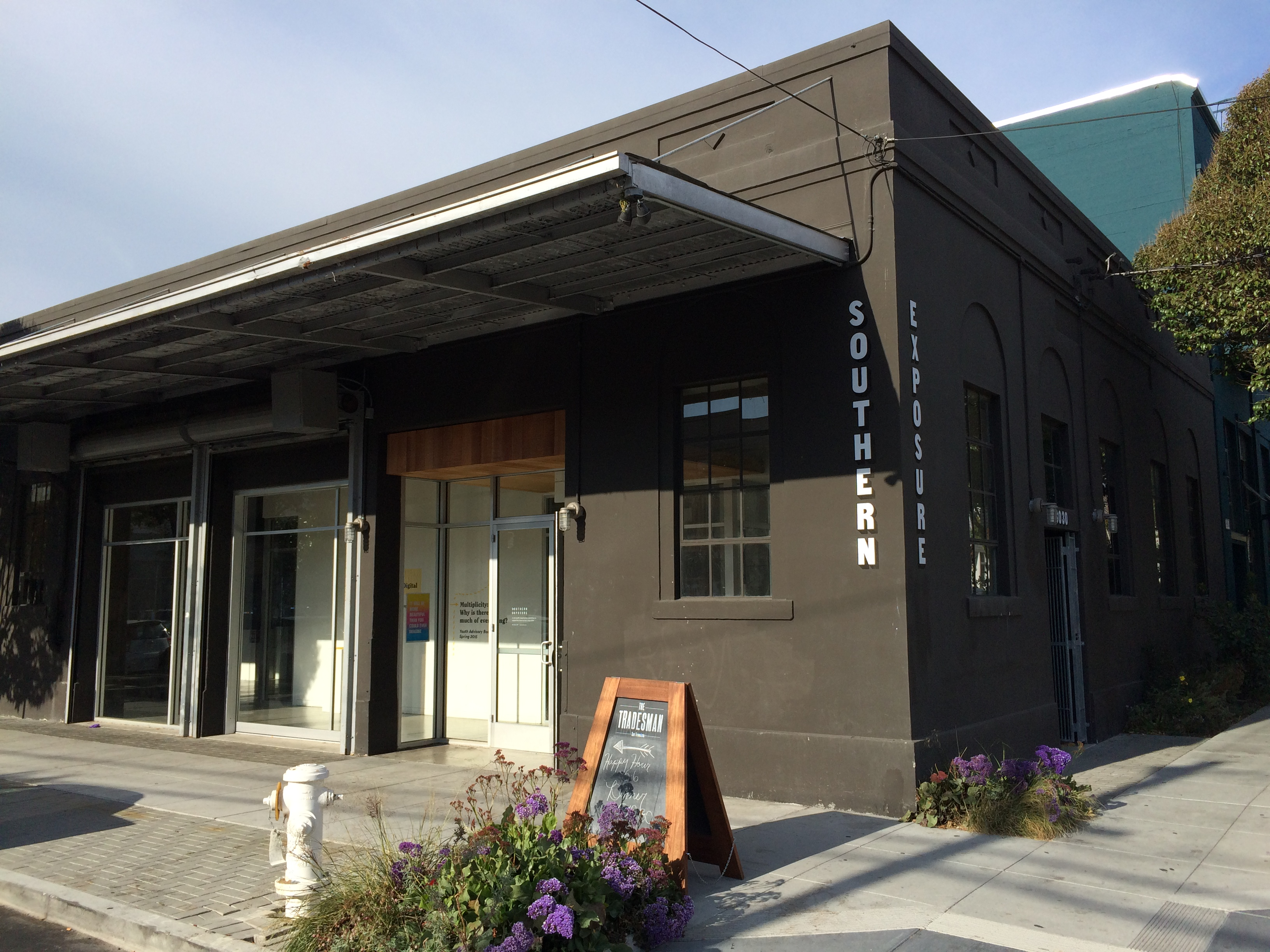
- Established: 1974
- Location: 3030 20th Street, San Francisco, California United States
- Type: non-profit arts organization
- Website: www.soex.org

Southern Exposure (SoEx) is a not-for-profit arts organization and alternative art space founded in 1974 in the Mission District of San Francisco, California. It was originally founded as a grassroots, cooperative art gallery in conjunction with Project Artaud which was a live/work artist community. By the 1980s, they converted the gallery to a community space for supporting emerging artists.

== Programs ==
=== Exhibitions and projects ===
Southern Exposure's exhibition program is curated by a committee of artists from the community. Each year, SoEx has a juried exhibition with an open call. The show is curated by a respected international curator. Past curators of the annual exhibition have included Magali Arriola, Tom Finkelpearl, and Kristan Kennedy.

=== Grant Program: Alternative Exposure ===
One of SoEx's main goals is to support the professional development of artists so they are able to live and work in the San Francisco Bay Area. The Alternative Exposure Grant program “supports the work of unincorporated groups, burgeoning art and gathering spaces, publications, Web sites, collectives, events and artists making work in a variety of ways.”

Alternative Exposure, was founded in partnership with the Andy Warhol Foundation for the Visual Arts, provides more than $65,000 of grants each year to individuals who work to promote other artists through exhibition spaces, publications, websites, critical writing and other activities. The Alternative Exposure program was initiated by former SoEx Executive Director Courtney Fink who first came to Southern Exposure in 2003 and departed in 2015.

=== Emerging Curator's Lab ===
According to the San Francisco Examiner's Max Blue, the Emerging Curator's Lab "is a two-year professional development and mentorship program. It reimagines Southern Exposure’s historic Curatorial Council, the nonprofit's community-led exhibition program, to provide curatorial education to people from diverse backgrounds." It is set to begin in October 2026. According to Executive Director Julio Cesar Morales, “It’s aimed at bypassing the colonial aspect of working at museums and the restrictions of who gets to curate and who has access to curatorial programs — or even art school in the first place.”

=== Night School ===
Night School, beginning in January 2027, will provide artists with tools and experiences to become art educators by creating small teaching/learning cohorts. This 12 week program partners with San Francisco Unified School District.

=== Public programs ===
Since moving away from Project Artaud in 2006, Southern Exposure has supported "offsite" public art projects which happen in the city of San Francisco. SoEx's Artists in Education (AIE) program provides intensive art education programs to hundreds of underserved youth each year.

SoEx provides access to affordable art through its annual Monster Drawing Rally event, auctions and sale of limited editions art works. In 2020, the gallery served as an official polling location during the Consolidated General Election, aimed at improving civic discourse and justice.
