= Hedi Kyle =

German-born American book artist and educator (born 1937)

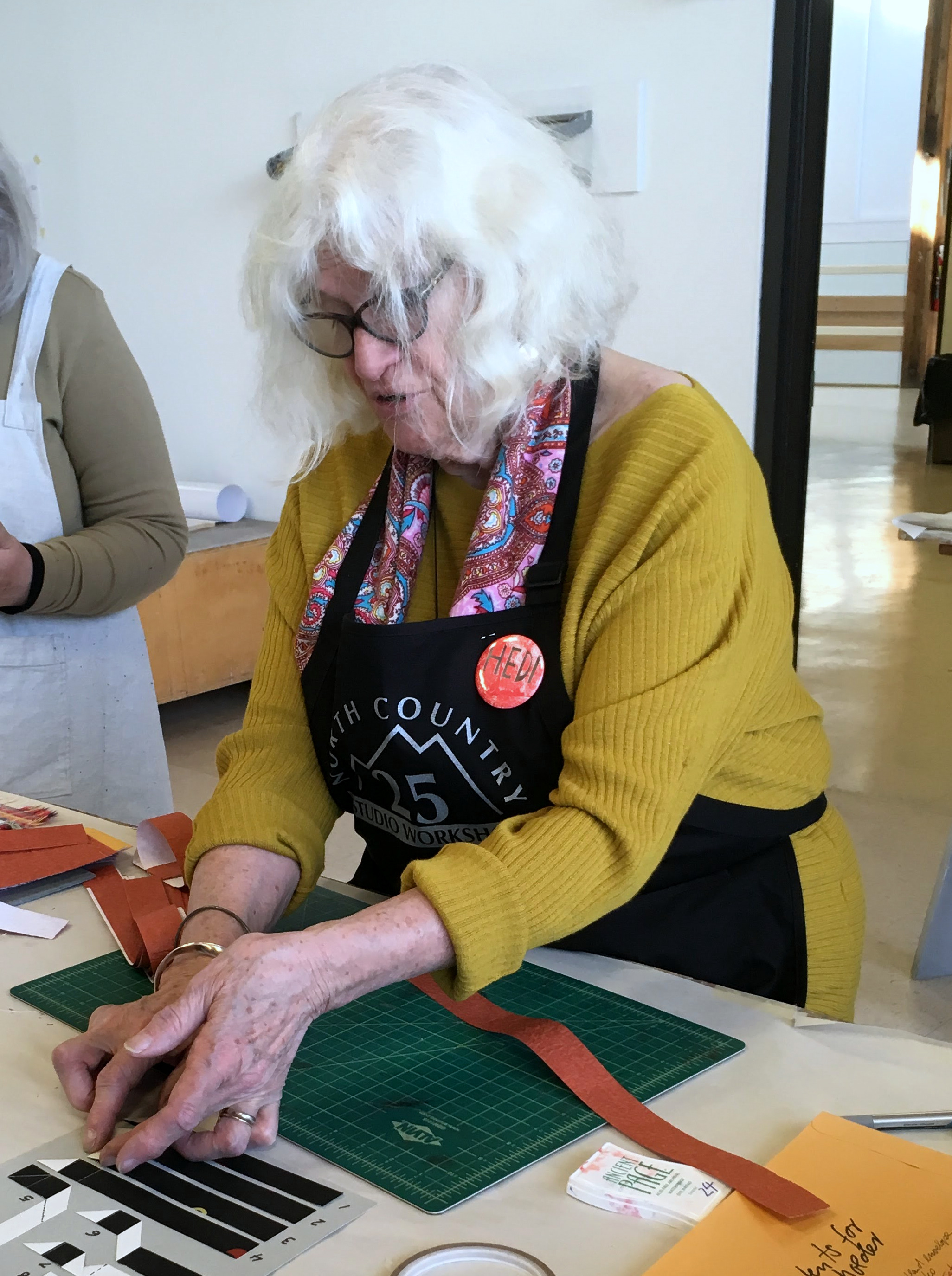
- Hedi Kyle teaching at the 2018 North Country Studio Workshops
- Education: Werk-Kunst Schule in Wiesbaden, Germany
- Known for: Co-founded the Paper and Book Intensive in 1983, former Head Conservator at the American Philosophical Society

Hedi Kyle (born 1937) is a German-born American book artist and educator who has had a major influence on the development of book arts.

== Early life and education ==
Kyle was born in what was then part of Poland. During World War II, she fled with her mother and siblings; her father served in the army. After the war, the family was reunited and moved to the German island of Borkum. After she completed high school, she attended an art school in Wiesbaden.

Kyle was employed as a commercial artist in Frankfurt. When she turned 21, she spent a year painting in Greece. She moved to the United States and settled in San Francisco.

During the 1970s, Kyle studied with bookbinder and conservator Laura Young in New York City.

== Career ==
Kyle began teaching when Richard Minsky offered her a job teaching at the Center for Book Arts in New York City. She also taught at Cooper Union.

Kyle worked as a conservator for the American Philosophical Society in Philadelphia. In 1987, she was invited to teach at the University of the Arts in Philadelphia.

In 1983, along with Timothy Barrett and Gary Frost, Kyle co-founded the Paper & Book Intensive, an annual series of bookbinding, papermaking, and conservation workshops.

Over the years, Kyle has come up with new and innovative ways of assembling books which are often based on traditional bookbinding techniques. In 1993, the Center for Book Arts held an exhibition "Hedi Kyle and her Influence: 1977–1993" which featured work by Kyle and twenty contemporary book artists influenced by her. In 2015, the 23 Sandy Gallery in Portland, Oregon held an exhibition called "Hello Hedi" featuring works inspired by Kyle.

At the urging of paper artist, engineer, and writer, Paul Jackson, she and her daughter, Ulla Warchol, published Art of the Fold about some of her most popular and creative techniques for making simple books and enclosures.
