= Ben Mahmoud =

American painter

Ben Mahmoud (October 6, 1935 – June 2, 2009) was a contemporary American artist.

== Life and work ==
Mahmoud was born and grew up in Charleston, West Virginia. He received his higher education at the Columbus (Ohio) Art School and Ohio University, graduating in 1960. For most of his professional career, he taught at Northern Illinois University in DeKalb, Illinois, where he also kept his art studio. He was an emeritus professor at Northern Illinois before his death.

Painting was his most successful medium, attracting critical acclaim and commercial success, but he also worked in other media, including print making, photography, and sculpture. In 1972 he established an affiliation with the Sonia Zaks Gallery in Chicago that would last thirty years. His work currently remains affiliated with the Patricia Rozvar galleries in Washington.

Mahmoud has exhibited his work at galleries and museums throughout the American Midwest, and also in Washington, Holland, and Germany. His work has been added to over 25 permanent, public collections, including the Art Institute of Chicago, and the Brooklyn Museum. Mahmoud lived the last several years of his life in New Port Richey, Florida, where his fascination with the surrounding flora influenced a collection of sculptures he called The Florida Series.
