= Rudolph Pen =

American visual artist

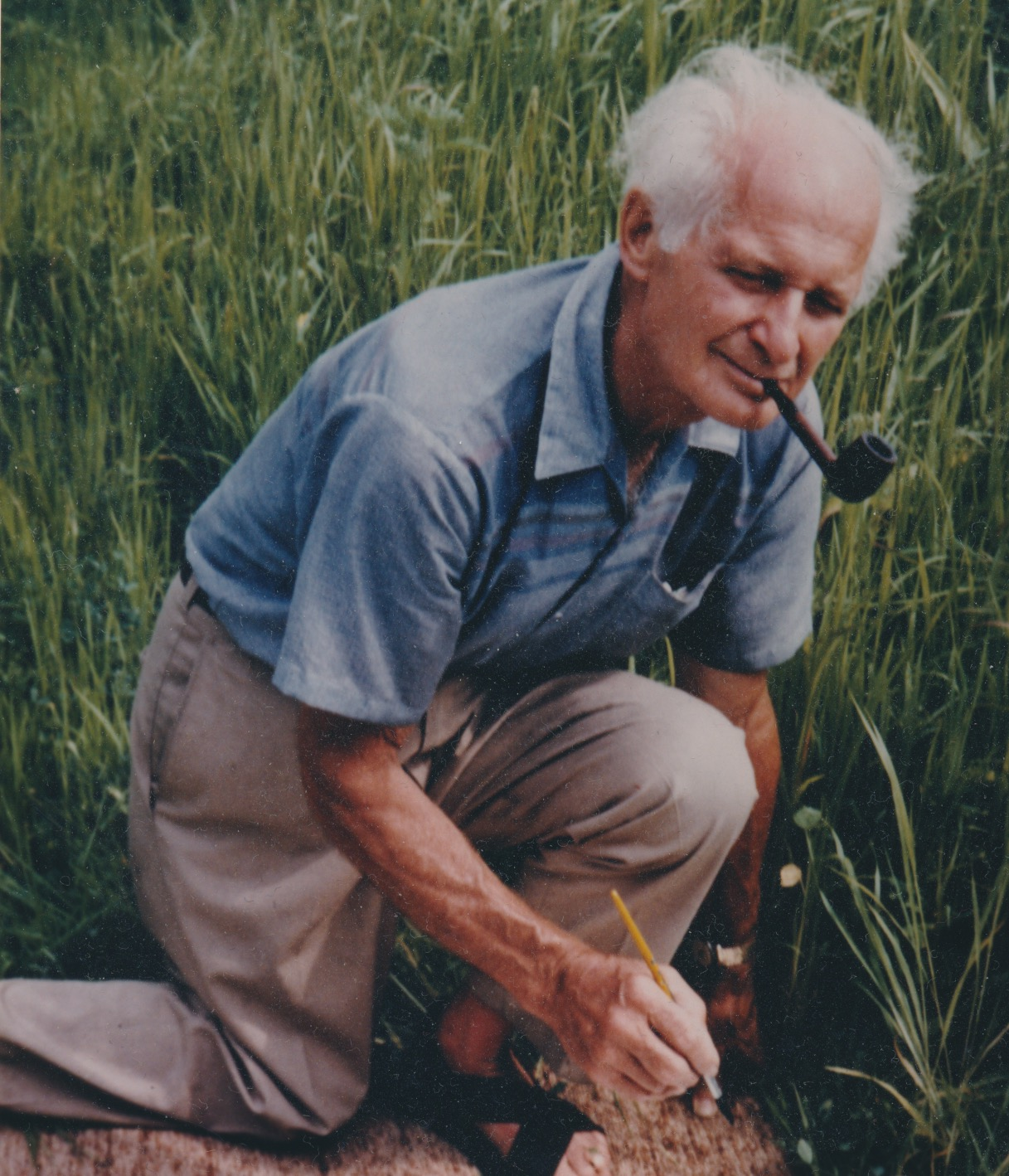
Rudolph Pen

Rudolph Theodore Pen (January 1, 1918—January 8, 1989) was an American visual artist.

His works spanned a range of media including watercolors, oils and acrylics, lithographs, and sculptures. His subjects included landscapes, horse and sailboat races, urban and industrial scenes, burlesque and ballet dancers, nudes, still life, and narrative works.

He was born in Chicago, Illinois and graduated with a B.A. from the Art Institute of Chicago where he studied under the Post-Impressionist master Louis Ritman. Upon graduation in 1943 he won the prestigious Joseph Ryerson Traveling Fellowship. In 1946 he married Yvonne Fillis, a singer and dancer whom he met while she was a student at the Goodman School of Drama.

Pen was an instructor at the Art Institute of Chicago, serving on its faculty from 1948 until 1963. His long association with the Institute included service as President of the Alumni Association and Director of Oxbow, the Art Institute's summer school of painting (1964-1965). He travelled widely in Europe, North Africa, the Caribbean, and South America each summer to paint; in 1958 he received a Huntington Hartford Foundation Grant that enabled him to paint while in residence at Hartford's Pacific Palisades, CA artists' retreat. Pen resigned from the Art Institute faculty in order to develop his private studio, where he taught from 1965—1989. During the politically turbulent 1960s Pen was employed as a court artist to document trials because cameras were not permitted in the courtroom.

Pen's work has been exhibited in numerous galleries, including Carroll Carstairs Gallery, (NYC), The Joseph Welna Gallery, The Frank Oehlschlaeger Gallery, and currently at the Richard Norton Gallery (Chicago). Paintings may be seen in public collections at The National Gallery of Art, The Library of Congress, The Vincent Price/Sears Collection, and the Art Institute of Chicago as well as in private collections throughout America. In 1983 his one-man show at the Tree Studio Building and Annexes in Chicago was featured in an interview with noted artist and critic Harry Bouras on "Art and Artists" broadcast on Chicago's WFMT radio. Pen's professional affiliations included The American Watercolor Society, National Academy of Design, and the Union League Club of Chicago.

A 2003 exhibition catalogue description described his style: "Rudolph Pen understood on an instinctive and molecular level that all things move. His work explores the way in which things move within unusual (often trapezoidal) shapes. Pen believed that our eyes rarely look at anything steadily and directly. His work leads the viewer beyond the confinement of the "square." Most importantly, Pen felt that innovation is the key to art. He is documented as the first artist to advocate shaped canvases. Pen's distinctive style, in both its strength and beauty, takes bold strokes beyond Impressionism to Futurism. While experimenting in various styles, his work remains undeniably personal and original."

Pen died at his home at 55 West Schiller Street in Chicago on January 8, 1989. Pen's papers are all held by the family estate.
