= Abigail Satinsky =

American art curator

- Born: Abigail Bette Satinsky; 1981 (age 44–45)
- Education: BFA, 2003, Carnegie Mellon University; MA, 2009, Modern Art History, and Arts Administration and Policy, School of the Art Institute of Chicago
- Known for: Art curation, grass-roots activism

Abigail Satinsky (born 1981) is an American arts organizer, curator and writer on socially engaged art.

== Early life and education ==
Abigail Bette Satinsky was born in 1981, the daughter of Daniel Satinsky and Dinah Vaprin. She earned a Bachelor of Fine Art in 2003 from Carnegie Mellon University and a Master of Arts, dual degree in modern art history and arts administration and policy in 2009 from the School of the Art Institute of Chicago. Her thesis, submitted to the department of art history, theory and criticism, and the department of art administration and policy, was on the collaborative work of group material (from 1976 to 1996). Her partner is Anthony Romero.

== Career ==
As a curator and programmer, her interest has been in championing interdisciplinary, process-based, and under-recognized artists’ work, artist-run and collaboratively organized community projects, and highlighting how artists have worked within and in solidarity with social movements. She is a founding member of Incubate (styled "inCUBATE"), a research collaborative on art economies, and co-initiator of Sunday Soup, an international micro-granting project. Satinsky cofounded and acted as codirector (along with Bryce Dwyer, Matthew Joynt and Roman Petruniak) of Incubate, a research group that curated, initiated and coproduced artist projects out of a Chicago store front from 2007 to 2009. Incubate became known for its Sunday Soup series, a micro-granting program which hosted dinner parties and used the proceeds to fund community-based artist projects voted on by the dinner guests. Incubate's work has been shown nationally, including Creative Time, Eyebeam Center for Art and Technology in New York, CEPA Gallery in Buffalo, Skydive in Houston, Autzen Gallery at Portland State University, the Devos Museum at Northern Michigan University and the Smart Museum of Art in Chicago.

From 2010 to 2015, Satinsky worked at Threewalls as associate director, where she edited two editions of Phonebook, in 2011 and 2015 (a national directory of artist-run spaces and projects). During this time she cofounded the Hand-in-Glove conference with Shannon R. Stratton, Bryce Dwyer and Elizabeth Chodos, and was one of the cofounders of Common Field, national initiatives on advocacy for small to mid-size nonprofits and grassroots artist projects, and Community Supported Art, a program to sell affordable artist editions modeled after community-supported agriculture.

Satinsky has worked with artists on solo exhibitions and projects while associate director at Threewalls, including Brandon Alvendia, Irina Botea (nominated for best time-based format by the International Association for Art Critics in 2014), Harold Mendez, Seth Kim-Cohen, Jaime Davidovich (with Daniel Quiles), Latham Zearfoss, ACRE TV, Rozalinda Borcila, Brian Holmes, Ashley Hunt, Taisha Paggett, Faith Wilding, and Mary Patten. She organized more than 100 programs over her time there which included artists and scholars Fred Moten, e-flux library, Laurie Palmer, Lane Relyea, Mary Jane Jacob, Daniel Joseph Martinez, and Michael Brenson. She also co-organized MDW Fair, an independent art fair showcasing Midwest artists and space.

She has taught on socially engaged art and curatorial practice at University of Illinois at Chicago, the School of the Art Institute of Chicago, Moore College of Art and Design and Tyler School of Art at Temple University. She is curator of exhibitions and programs at the School of the Museum of Fine Arts at Tufts University.

== Selected exhibitions and projects ==
- Radio Silence (2017-2018) (producer) with artist Michael Rakowitz and curator Liz Thomas with Mural Arts Philadelphia, a seven-episode radio broadcast and large-scale performance on Independence Mall in Philadelphia.
- Meadow Mansions (2016), an exhibit featuring the 18th century Mount Pleasant mansion in Fairmount Park. The group exhibition was commissioned by Fairmount Park Conservancy, Philadelphia Parks and Recreation, Audubon Pennsylvania, and the Philadelphia Museum of Art, and funded by ArtPlace with Design.
- A Modest Occupation (2013), The Luminary in St. Louis, MO, Transformer Gallery in Washington DC and Threewalls in Chicago.

== Publishing ==
In 2014 Satinsky edited the book, Support Networks, part of the Chicago Social Practice History series (edited by Mary Jane Jacob and Kate Zeller in the Department of Exhibitions and Exhibition Studies at the School of the Art Institute of Chicago). She has published essays and articles on online platforms such as Art Practical and Temporary Art Review, and for organizations such as Open Engagement. She is a regular contributor to the Bad at Sports podcast and her writing has appeared in the Journal of Aesthetics and Protest, AREA Chicago, and Proximity Magazine. She contributed to podcast conversations with Bad at Sports which were collected in two edited volumes, Say It While You Still Mean It: Conversations on Art and Practice, Volumes 1 and 2, published by Open Engagement in Print. She was editor of the book Support Networks, published by the School of the Art Institute of Chicago and University of Chicago Press, which chronicles socially engaged art in Chicago over the last one hundred years.

Satinsky has also co-authored essays and blog posts on the subject of socially-engaged art with partner Anthony Romero.

== Awards ==
She was a fellow, John Nicholas Brown Center, Brown University, Providence, RI.

In 2016, she received the Art Journal Award for distinguished writing from College Art Association for her essay "Movement Building for Beginners".
