= Jack Beal =

American painter (1931 – 2013)

- Born: June 25, 1931; Richmond, Virginia, United States
- Died: August 29, 2013 (aged 82); Oneonta, New York, United States
- Education: Old Dominion University; School of the Art Institute of Chicago
- Occupation: Realist Painter
- Spouse: Sondra Freckelton (m. 1955)

Walter Henry "Jack" Beal Jr. (June 25, 1931 – August 29, 2013) was an American realist painter.

== Biography ==
Jack Beal was born in Richmond, Virginia in 1931. He studied at the Norfolk Division of the College of William & Mary and then at the School of the Art Institute of Chicago, where he was a student of Kathleen Blackshear. At the Art Institute of Chicago, he met artist Sondra Freckelton (1936-2019), who he married in 1955. In 1957, Beal and Freckleton moved to New York City and then in the 1970s to a farm in Oneonta, New York. He died in Oneonta in August 2013 at the age of 82.

Beal achieved recognition in New York City and elsewhere during the 1960s. His realist paintings were seen in solo exhibitions at the Allen Frumkin Galleries in New York City and Chicago, and dozens of other galleries in New York, Boston, Miami, Paris and elsewhere. His paintings have been included in important exhibitions at The Whitney Museum of American Art and the Virginia Museum of Fine Arts, among other fine art institutions. In 1976, Beal was elected into the National Academy of Design as an Associate member, and became a full member in 1983. In the 1990s, Beal taught at the New York Academy of Art and Hollins College.

== Realism ==
Beal's early work after leaving the Art Institute of Chicago was strongly influenced by Abstract Expressionism, especially the work of Arshile Gorky, but he quickly grew disillusioned with the movement. Beal was one of several New York-based painters of the 1960s, including Philip Pearlstein and Alfred Leslie, who rejected Abstract Expressionism and embraced an approach to figurative art that has been termed "New Realism." Beal "mined a rich vein of representation, which has usually demonstrated a fine sense of observation, an inventive painterliness, an acute responsiveness to shape and pattern, the ability to create dynamic compositional structures, and always the willingness to take artistic risks rather than languish in a single mode of picture making." The variety of Beal's works included nudes, still-lifes, portraits, landscapes, and allegorical compositions.

== Public Art ==
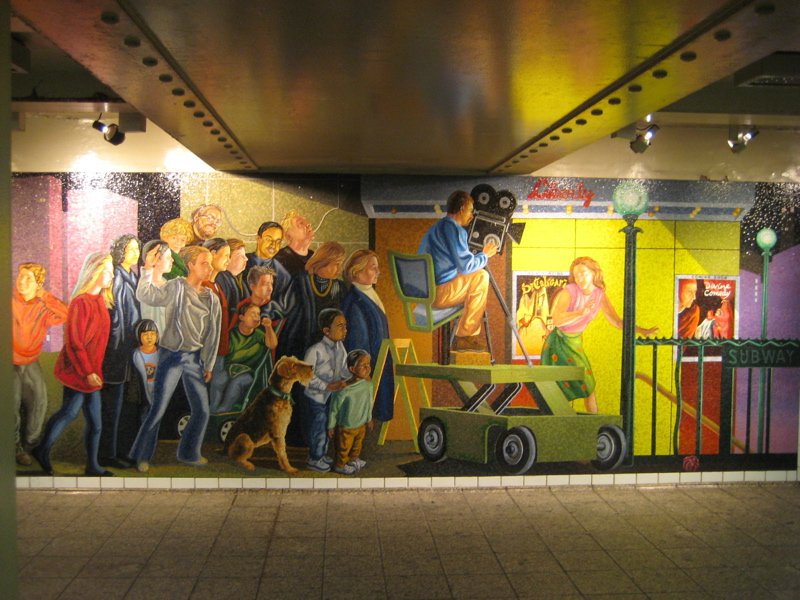
Beal's "Onset of Winter" (2005) in the Times Square-42nd Street Subway Station

In addition to oil paintings, drawings, etchings, and lithographs, Beal also undertook major works of public art.

=== The History of Labor in America ===
The US General Service Administration commissioned Beal to create four murals, The History of Labor in America, which he painted between 1974 and 1977 for the new headquarters of the United States Department of Labor in Washington, D.C. Beal was assisted by his wife, Sondra Freckleton Beal, a skilled watercolorist, along with two former students from San Diego State College, Dana Van Horn and Robert "Bob" Treloar, who served as his apprentices. It was one of the first such commissions by the federal government since the WPA Federal Art Project (1935-1943). With their optimistic portrayal of the history of labor in the United States and the theme of the dignity of work, Hilton Kramer declared that "Jack Beal established himself as the most important Social Realist to have emerged in American painting since the 1930s." Recalling Beal's sense of humor, Sondra Freckelton commented that the dynamic poses of workers, which were inspired by the Old Masters and included an electrician installing cables while leaning backward on a ladder, was certainly "against OSHA regulations."

=== The Return of Spring and The Onset of Winter ===
In 1986, the MTA commissioned Beal to produce a mosaic mural for the Times Square-42nd Street Subway Station titled The Return of Spring (2001). After the positive response to the first mural, the MTA commissioned a second mural facing it, The Onset of Winter (2005). They present the classical myth of Persephone set against the backdrop of the New York City Subway. The models for the figures in the mosaic murals include Beal (as Poseidon) and Freckelton (as Flora), as well as many of the artist’s friends, such as Muppets designer Bonnie Erickson and architect Malcolm Holzman (as Dante).

One of the four panels of Jack Beal's "The History of Labor in America" (1974-1977)

== Public collections ==
- The Art Institute of Chicago, Chicago, Illinois
- Delaware Art Museum, Wilmington, Delaware
- Hirshhorn Museum and Sculpture Garden, Washington, DC
- Kalamazoo Institute of Arts, Kalamazoo, MI
- Museum of Modern Art, New York
- National Gallery of Art, Washington, DC
- National Museum of American Art, Washington, DC
- Neuberger Museum of Art, State University of New York, Purchase
- Philadelphia Museum of Art, Philadelphia, Pennsylvania
- The John and Mable Ringling Museum of Art, Sarasota, Florida
- San Francisco Museum of Modern Art, San Francisco, California
- Smith College Museum of Art, Northampton, Massachusetts
- Toledo Art Museum, Toledo, Ohio
- Valparaiso University, Valparaiso, Indiana
- Virginia Museum of Fine Arts, Richmond, Virginia
- Walker Art Center, Minneapolis, Minnesota
- Whitney Museum of American Art, New York City
