= Timothy Barrett (papermaker) =

American papermaker

Timothy D. Barrett
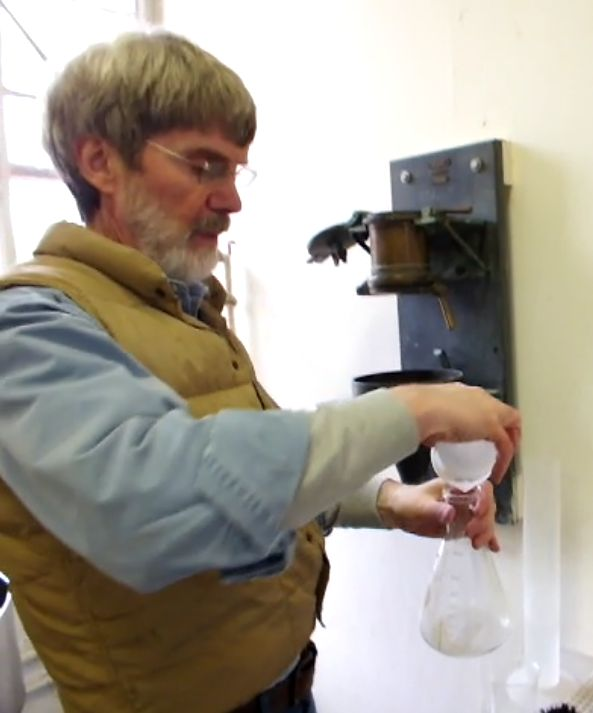
- Photographed in 2017
- Known for: Papermaking
- Awards: Fulbright Fellowship; 1975; MacArthur Fellowship; 2009

Academic background
- Education: Antioch College

Academic work
- Discipline: Book arts
- Sub-discipline: Japanese papermaking, European papermaking
- Institutions: University of Iowa Center for the Book

Timothy D. Barrett is an American papermaker, researcher, and paper historian. He is professor emeritus and a former director of the University of Iowa Center for the Book. He received a MacArthur Fellowship in 2009.

== Early life ==
Barrett grew up in Kalamazoo, Michigan, once known as the "Paper City" due to its prominent papermaking industry. His father, an English professor at Kalamazoo College, would take the family to visit local factories, including a paper mill on one occasion. Barrett became interested in papermaking at a young age and was introduced to the work of Dard Hunter as a teenager through the book Papermaking Through Eighteen Centuries. He built his own papermaking mould and deckle before ever making paper himself.

== Education and early research ==
Barrett first experimented with papermaking while attending Antioch College, where he explored various other crafts including ceramics, stained glass, printmaking, and leather tanning. He received a BA in Art Communications from Antioch College in 1973. Following graduation, he worked with Kathryn Clark and Howard Clark at Twinrocker Handmade Paper in Indiana for two years.

In 1975, Barrett received a two-year Fulbright Fellowship to study papermaking in Japan. With no previous knowledge of Japanese culture or language, he explored the countryside to find papermakers and learn about their process. After returning from Japan, Barrett set up a papermaking workshop in his parents' barn while taking classes at Western Michigan University's School of Paper Science and Engineering.

In 1983, Barrett published Japanese Papermaking: Traditions, Tools, and Techniques based on his research in Japan as well as his experience as a practitioner. In the same year, along with book conservators Hedi Kyle and Gary Frost, he co-founded the Paper and Book Intensive (PBI), an annual series of bookbinding, papermaking, and conservation workshops at the Ox-Bow School of Art. He researched early European handmade papers for several years with funding from the National Endowment for the Arts and the Kress Foundation.

== University of Iowa Center for the Book ==
In 1986, Kim Merker founded the University of Iowa Center for the Book (UICB) and invited Barrett to join the faculty, making Iowa one of the only universities in the country to employ a papermaker. As the Center's paper specialist, Barrett developed papermaking curriculum, established and oversaw the Oakdale Research and Production Paper Facility, and continued his research. Barrett's research interests included Japanese papermaking, early European papermaking technology, the role of gelatin in paper permanence, and the aesthetics of traditional handmade paper. Barrett and his students designed and produced specialized handmade papers for use by book and paper conservators at institutions such as the Library of Congress and the Newberry Library, as well as fine press printers and book artists.

Barrett served as director of the UICB from 1996 to 2002. In 1999, he was commissioned by the National Archives and Records Administration to fabricate handmade paper for the “Charters of Freedom Re-encasement Project” to re-house the Declaration of Independence, the Bill of Rights, and the U.S. Constitution. The paper, which was made by Barrett and his staff and students from American-grown cotton and laid beneath the original parchment documents, "helps enhance the light appearance of the translucent parchment; provides a soft, stable cushion between the document and the perforated metal plate below; and stabilizes the humidity within each encasement."

In 2009, Barrett was awarded a MacArthur Fellowship, often called the "genius grant", as a result of his research on early European handmade papers. In 2012 he was again director of the UICB, and he remained in that role until his retirement in 2020. In 2018, Barrett published European Hand Papermaking: Traditions, Tools, and Techniques, a companion to his 1983 publication on Japanese papermaking; the book was described as "the first comprehensive how-to book about traditional European hand papermaking since Dard Hunter's renowned reference, Papermaking: The History and Technique of an Ancient Craft".

== Retirement and legacy ==
Barrett retired from the UICB in 2020 with plans to set up a workshop in his basement to continue making paper. In 2022, Barrett was selected as the speaker for the third annual William D. Minter Lectureship in Conservation at Pennsylvania State University Libraries. In 2024, Barrett curated an exhibition at the University of Iowa Special Collections and Archives Reading Room of his collection of Japanese chōchin lanterns, which he became interested in during his Fulbright Fellowship in Japan in the 1970s.

The Tim Barrett Collection at the University of Iowa Libraries Special Collections holds archival materials from Barrett's career.

== Awards ==
- Fulbright Fellowship, 1975
- MacArthur Fellowship, 2009

== Works ==
=== Books ===
- Nagashizuki: The Japanese Craft of Hand Papermaking (North Hills, Penn.: Bird & Bull Press, 1979)
- Japanese Papermaking: Traditions, Tools, and Techniques (New York: Weatherhill, 1983; ISBN 0-8348-0185-X)
- European Hand Papermaking: Traditions, Tools, and Techniques (Ann Arbor, Mich.: The Legacy Press, 2018; ISBN 978-1-940965-11-6)

=== Journals ===
- Early European Papers, Contemporary Conservation Papers: A Report on Research Undertaken from Fall 1984 Through Fall 1987 (Paper Conservator v. 13; London: Institute of Paper Conservation, 1989)

=== Websites ===
- Paper Through Time: Nondestructive Analysis of 14th- Through 19th-Century Papers (The University of Iowa, 2012)
