= Sondra Freckelton =

American sculptor, watercolorist (1936–2019)

- Born: Sondra Freckelton; June 23, 1936; Dearborn, Michigan, U.S.
- Died: June 10, 2019 (aged 82); Oneonta, New York, U.S.
- Other names: Sondra Beal, Sondra Freckleton
- Education: School of the Art Institute of Chicago
- Spouse: Jack Beal

Sondra Freckelton (June 23, 1936 – June 10, 2019) was an American sculptor and watercolorist. She also known as Sondra Freckleton, and Sondra Beal.

== Life and career ==
Sondra Freckelton was born on June 23, 1936, in Dearborn, Michigan. She attended the School of the Art Institute of Chicago. In 1955, she married fellow realist artist Jack Beal (1931–2013). Her sculpture was included in the 1959 exhibition Recent Sculpture U.S.A. at the Museum of Modern Art (as Sondra Beal). Her work was also included in the 1964 Annual Exhibition of Contemporary American Sculpture at the Whitney (as Sondra Beal). In the mid-1970s Freckelton began focusing on watercolor painting.

Freckelton died on June 10, 2019, in Oneonta, New York.

Her work is in the Art Institute of Chicago, the Kalamazoo Institute of Arts, the Madison Museum of Contemporary Art, the Oklahoma City Museum of Art, and the Smithsonian American Art Museum, and the Virginia Museum of Fine Arts.
