= Shannon R. Stratton =

Canadian artist, writer and curator (born 1975)

- Born: Shannon Rae Stratton
- Education: BFA, 2000, Alberta College of Art and Design; MFA, 2003, MA 2007; School of the Art Institute of Chicago
- Known for: Curator, non-profit founder and artist-run advocate

Shannon R. Stratton is a Canadian artist, writer and curator. She is currently executive director of Ox-Bow School of Art and Artists' Residency in Saugatuck, Michigan.

== Career ==
Stratton received her MA in art, history, theory and criticism and MFA in studio art from The School of the Art Institute of Chicago in 2007 and 2003. Stratton is best known for work advocating for artist-run and DIY arts organizations, which she has lectured on across the United States and Canada. In 2003 she founded the Chicago-based contemporary visual arts organization, Threewalls, with Jonathan Rhodes, Jeff Ward and Sonia Yoon where she was executive and creative director from 2010–2015. From 2015-2019 Stratton was the deputy director of curatorial affairs and William and Mildred Lasdon Chief Curator at the Museum of Arts and Design in New York City. In addition, she is co-founder of the Hand-in-Glove conference with Abigail Satinsky, Bryce Dwyer and Elizabeth Chodos, which lead to the founding of Common Field, a national organization in support of artist-focused and run organizations co-founded with Satinsky, Chodos, Courtney Fink, Stephanie Sherman and Nat May.

== Curating ==
Stratton has worked with 75+ artists on solo exhibitions and projects while artistic and then executive and creative director at Threewalls, including Cauleen Smith, William Cordova, Michael Jones McKean, Christy Matson, John Brumit, Frank Haines, Dani Leventhal, Kyla Mallet, Luanne Martineau, Daniel Barrow, David Noonan, Zachary Cahill, Cayetano Ferrer, Irina Haiduk (Ika Knezevic), Carol Jackson, Kelly Kaczynski, Harold Mendez, Anne-Elizabeth Moore, Laurie Palmer, Mary Patten, Claire Pentecost, Armita Rafaat, Ben Russell, Andrew Norman Wilson, Anders Ruhwald, Fraser Taylor and David Hartt among many others.

Other exhibitions include:

- Roger Brown: Virtual Still Lifes, The Museum of Arts and Design, 2019
- Tanya Aguiñiga: Craft & Care, The Museum of Arts and Design, 2018
- Sonic Arcade: Shaping Space with Sound, The Museum of Arts and Design, 2017
- Encounter with Presence: Emery Blagdon and Harry Bertoia, The Kohler Center for the Arts, Sheboygan, WI, 2017
- In Time: The Rhythm of the Workshop, The Museum of Arts and Design, 2016
- Atmosphere for Enjoyment: Harry Bertoia's Environment for Sound, The Museum of Arts and Design, 2016
- Coille Hooven: Tell it By Heart, The Museum of Arts and Design, 2016
- Faith Wilding: Fearful Symmetries, The Pasadena Armory Center for the Arts, Pasadena, CA, 2015
- Resonating Bodies, The Soap Factory, Minneapolis, MN, 2013
- Binary Lore: Edie Fake & MSHR (with Mack MacFarland), Philip Feldman Gallery + Project Space, Pacific Northwest College of Art, Portland, OR, 2012
- Things to Be Next To (with Kate Hackman), Charlotte Street Foundation, Kansas City, MO, 2010
- Gestures of Resistance: The Slow Assertions of Craft (with Judith Leemann), The Portland Museum of Contemporary Craft, Portland, OR, 2010
- Reskilling (with Luanne Martineau), The Western Front, Vancouver, Canada, 2008

== Publishing ==
Stratton edited the first monograph about feminist artist, Faith Wilding, "Fearful Symmetries," (Intellect, 2018)

Stratton's writing on craft has been included in “Collaborations Through Craft,” (Berg Publishing, 2012) and "Craft on Demand: the New Politics of the Handmade" (I.B. Tauris and Co. Ltd 2017). An edited volume based on her exhibition Faith Wilding: Fearful Symmetries, will be published by Intellect Books in 2018.

With Threewalls, Stratton initiated PHONEBOOK, the first listings guide to artist-run spaces currently operating the US. The first two editions were co-published with Caroline Picard of Green Lantern Press in 2007 and 2008, and then later solely by Threewalls and edited by Abigail Satinsky (2011, 2015).

== Teaching ==
From 2007-2015 Stratton taught in the Fiber and Material Studies and Art History, Theory and Criticism departments at The School of the Art Institute of Chicago. She developed the class Party As Form for Ox Bow School of Art in Saugatuck, Michigan where participants explored the party as a social practice art form.

== Select bibliography ==
- Cahill, Zachary * “Exquisite Self-Reliance,” The Exhibitionist, April 2015
- Foumberg, Jason. “Art 50: Chicago's Visual Vanguard,” Newcity, September 19, 2014.
- Foumberg, Jason. “The C-Notes Power List: Art's Hit Makers,” Chicago Magazine Online, February 19, 2013.
- Waxman, Lori. “Keeping threewalls Standing” (Chicagoans of the Year) The Chicago Tribune; December 25, 2011.
- "Artists" Proximity Magazine Issue No 2., Fall 2008.
- Grabner, Michelle. “Restless” TimeOut Chicago May 8-14th, 2008.
- Waxman, Lori. “Shannon Stratton,” artforum.com “Critic's Picks”, April 30, 2008.
- Weinberg, Lauren. “SOLO Expectations,” TimeOut Chicago October 4- 10th, 2007
