= List of Peabody Award winners (2000–2009) =

The following is a list of George Foster Peabody Award winners and honorable mentions during the decade of the 2000s.

== 2000 ==
Recipient	Area of Excellence
Marty Haag	Personal Award for his work as news director at WFAA-TV/Dallas, TX and as senior vice-president of Broadcast News Operations for Belo
CBS News	48 Hours (anchored by Dan Rather), for the report "Heroes Under Fire" by Bill Lagattuta, which examined the cause and aftermath of the Worcester Cold Storage and Warehouse fire
CBS News	60 Minutes II, for the report "Death by Denial", reported by Ed Bradley, which examined the outbreak of HIV/AIDS in Africa
NBC News	Dateline NBC, for the report "The Paper Chase" from correspondent John Larson and reporter Andy Lehren, a look at a "paper file review" of one auto accident victim's medical claim
KHOU/Houston, TX	"Treading on Danger", an investigation by KHOU's Investigative Unit, led by David Raziq, and reporter Anna Werner of failures of Firestone tires on Ford vehicles
KBS Chong-Ju	An Eighty-Four Year Old Youngful Man Lives in the Cabin, directed by Hyun Jin Hong
WJXT/Jacksonville, FL	Behind Closed Doors, a documentary anchored by Deborah Gianoulis examining treatment of domestic violence victims at Hubbard House
P.O.V./American Documentary Inc., National Asian American Telecommunications Association, and Sun Fountain Productions	Regret to Inform
HBO, Whiteford-Hadary, University of Maryland, and Tapestry International	King Gimp
Wall to Wall for Channel 4 in association with WNET/New York, NY	The 1900 House
Heartlove Productions, Lovett Productions, HBO	Cancer: Evolution to Revolution, directed by Joseph F. Lovett and narrated by Lilly Tartikoff
WGBH-TV (Boston, MA)/Frontline, co-produced with Rain Media Inc. and Cam Bay Productions	Frontline, for Drug Wars, a documentary about the war on drugs, produced by Martin Smith and with contributors including Lowell Bergman, Doug Hamilton, Kenneth Levis, Brooke Runnette, and Oriana Zill
HBO Sports	Ali-Frazier 1: One Nation...Divisible, produced by Joseph M. Lavine and Jonathan Crystal
CNN Productions, Insight News Television, and Channel Four International	CNN Perspectives: Cry Freetown
David Grubin Productions Inc. and Devillier Donegan Enterprises (aired on PBS)	Napoleon, a four-part series on Napoleon directed by David Grubin
BBC, Discovery Channel, and TV Asahi, in association with ProSieben and France 3	Walking with Dinosaurs
Marketplace Productions/Minnesota Public Radio, in association with the University of Southern California	Marketplace
Sound Portraits Productions	Witness to an Execution, a feature story on NPR's All Things Considered produced by Jim Willett, Stacy Abramson, David Isay, and David Miller profiling capital punishment in Texas
National Public Radio	"The NPR 100", a showcase of "the 100 most important American musical works of the 20th century", airing on Morning Edition, All Things Considered, and Weekend Edition and produced by Elizabeth Blair
True Vision Productions Ltd. for Channel 4 in association with HBO	Slavery, a film by Kate Blewett and Brian Woods on contemporary slavery on multiple continents
Katie Couric and NBC News	Award for Couric's series "Confronting Colon Cancer"
Learning Matters Inc. and The Merrow Report (aired on PBS)	School Sleuth: The Case of an Excellent School, produced and presented by John Merrow
WGBH-TV/Boston, MA and Cinar	Arthur
Idaho Public Television and Idaho Department of Health and Welfare	Hearts and Minds: Teens and Mental Illness, produced by Marcia Franklin
WGBH-TV (Boston, MA) Science Unit and Production Group, Inc.	Building Big
NBC and John Wells Productions, in association with Warner Bros. Television	The West Wing (the show's second win, a rare feat)
HBO, Chase Films, and Brad Grey Television	The Sopranos (the show's second win, a rare feat)
Robert Greenwald Productions Inc. and Pearson Television International (distributor) (aired on CBS)	Sharing the Secret
BBC America and WGBH-TV/Boston, MA	ExxonMobil Masterpiece Theatre, for David Copperfield
A&E Networks and Columbia TriStar Television in association with Chris/Rose Productions Inc.	The Crossing
Blown Deadline Productions, Knee Deep Productions, and HBO	The Corner
Fox, Satin City, and Regency Television	Malcolm in the Middle
Mad Cow Productions Inc. in association with Comedy Central	The Daily Show with Jon Stewart, for its Indecision 2000 series
Tiger Aspect Productions for NVC Arts and Channel 4	Howard Goodall's Big Bangs, a series hosted by Howard Goodall on pivotal events in the history of music

== 2001 ==
Recipient	Area of Excellence
ABC News	Separate awards for the networks' coverage of the September 11 terrorist attacks
National Public Radio	Separate awards for the networks' coverage of the September 11 terrorist attacks
Tenth Planet Productions and the U.S. broadcast and cable networks	America: A Tribute to Heroes
NBC and John Wells Productions	Third Watch, for "In Their Own Words", a stand-alone profile of real-life responders to the 9/11 attack on New York City
Hardcash Productions, Channel 4, and CNN Productions	CNN Presents, for the documentaries Beneath the Veil and Unholy War
Touchstone Television (aired on ABC)	Anne Frank: The Whole Story
WNET/New York, NY	American Masters, for F. Scott Fitzgerald: Winter Dreams
WCPO-TV/Cincinnati	Visions of Vine Street, an "I-Team" documentary profiling the Cincinnati thoroughfare and the adjacent Over-the-Rhine neighborhood (the epicenter of an April 2001 riot) and the issues that affect the area
Canadian Broadcasting Corporation	"A Murder in the Neighbourhood", a report airing on Sunday Edition that profiled a murder in Pickering, Ontario and its effects on the victim's neighbors
Television Broadcasts Limited	WTO Challenge
Brook Lapping Productions for BBC2, in association with WGBH/Boston, MA, RTÉ, La Sept ARTE, SBS, and YLE	Endgame in Ireland
40 Acres and a Mule Filmworks, Luna Ray Films, Black Starz!, KQED/San Francisco, PBS and Black Heritage Network	A Huey P. Newton Story
A Carlton production in association with The Learning Channel for Channel 4	Hell in the Pacific
HBO Films, produced in association with the BBC	Conspiracy
Showtime, Echo Lake Productions, and Sidekick Entertainment Productions	Things Behind the Sun
Avenue Pictures in association with HBO Films	Wit
Wilmore Films, Regency Television, and 20th Century Fox Television	The Bernie Mac Show
Peter Rosen Productions Inc., KERA-TV/Dallas, TX, and the Van Cliburn Foundation	The Cliburn: Playing on the Edge, about the Eleventh Van Cliburn International Piano Competition
Survival Anglia Ltd. (aired on National Geographic EXPLORER/MSNBC)	Mzima – Haunt of the Riverhorse
Slow Motion Ltd. (produced for BBC) and WGBH/Boston, MA	ExxonMobil Masterpiece Theatre, for Talking Heads II – Miss Fozzard Finds Her Feet
Ciesla Foundation and Cinemax	The Life and Times of Hank Greenberg
Independent Television Service, Paul Fierlinger & Sandra Fierlinger, and AR&T Associates, Inc. (aired on Independent Lens/PBS)	Still Life with Animated Dogs
SoundVision Productions (distributed by NPR)	The DNA Files, hosted by John Hockenberry
Norman Twain Productions with Shelby Stone Productions in association with HBO Films	Boycott
Teachers Documentary Project (aired on PBS)	The First Year
National Film Board of Canada (aired on TVOntario's The View from Here)	My Father's Camera, directed by Karen Shopsowitz
Youth Radio	Institutional Award for the media outlet and its training of teenagers in the art of radio production and storytelling
Nickelodeon	Little Bill
Nickelodeon	Blue's Clues
WGBH/Boston, MA	Institutional Award for its overall excellence in public broadcasting
CBS News	60 Minutes II, for "Memories of a Massacre", (co-produced by Gregory Vistica and Tom Anderson) which recounted the Thanh Phong raid during the Vietnam War
Band of Brothers Ltd., on behalf of DreamWorks and Playtone	Band of Brothers
Nightline	Institutional Award to the ABC News program
National Public Radio	Jazz Profiles

== 2002 ==
Recipient	Area of Excellence
ABC News	Nightline, for "Heart of Darkness", a series of reports on the war in the Democratic Republic of the Congo (Ted Koppel and Martin Seemungal, correspondents)
ABC News	Nightline, for "The Survivors", a profile of two burn victims of the 9/11 attack on The Pentagon, produced by Paul Fine and Holly Fine
ALT Films, in association with Paramount Pictures for WGBH/Boston, MA (presented on PBS)	ExxonMobil Masterpiece Theatre's American Collection: Almost a Woman
London Weekend Television production for WGBH/Boston, MA, in association with the Canadian Broadcasting Corporation (presented on PBS)	ExxonMobil Masterpiece Theatre: Othello
BBC Radio 4, London, UK	File on 4, for "Export Controls", a report from Allan Urry revealing how "rogue nations" procured equipment from British companies for use in their nuclear arms programs
Blue Angel Films Ltd., and Tyrone Productions for WNET/New York, NY	Stage on Screen: Beckett on Film
CBS	9/11
CNN	Terror on Tape, reported by Nic Robertson
Court TV, JB Media, and Hearst Entertainment	The Interrogation of Michael Crowe, a movie about the murder of Stephanie Crowe directed by Don McBrearty
David E. Kelley Productions, in association with 20th Century Fox Television	Boston Public, for "Chapter Thirty-Seven", an episode that dealt with the use of racial epithets in conversation and its impact
ESPN, Bristol, Connecticut, and Lake Champlain Productions	The Complete Angler (featuring James Prosek)
Fuji Television Network Inc., Tokyo, Japan	The Hepatitis C Epidemic: A 15-Year Government Cover-up, reported by Michiyo Kudo
Greenblatt/Janollari Studios and Actual Size Films Inc., in association with HBO Original Programming	Six Feet Under
HBO and Simmons/Lathan TV	Russell Simmons Presents Def Poetry
Kitchen Sisters, Sonic Memorial Collaboration, NPR's Lost & Found Sound, Ben Shapiro Productions, Jamie York Productions, Jay Allison Productions, Radio Diaries, The Public Collaboration, Picture Projects with dotsperinch	The Sonic Memorial Project and SonicMemorial.org, for the aural chronicling of life around the World Trade Center
KPRC-TV/Houston, TX	"DNA Protects Men of Dishonor", an investigation by reporter Stephen Dean into prevention of DNA evidence being used in rape cases in the US Military
NBC Studios in association with DreamWorks Television Inc. and Nemo Films	Boomtown
Nebraska ETV Network for American Experience, a production of WGBH/Boston (presented on PBS)	American Experience: Monkey Trial, directed by Christine Lesiak
Public Television Service Foundation, Taipei, Taiwan	How High is the Mountain, directed by Tang Shiang-Chu
WNET/New York, NY	EGG, the Arts Show
Quest Productions and Video Line Productions for WNET/New York, NY (presented on PBS)	The Rise and Fall of Jim Crow, a four-part documentary on segregation directed by Richard Wormser and Bill Jersey
Scott Free Productions, in association with HBO Films and BBC Films	The Gathering Storm
SET Productions and C-Films Productions for WGBH/Boston, in association with France2, Abu Dhabi Television, and Tel-Ad Israel (presented on PBS)	Frontline: Shattered Dreams of Peace: The Road From Oslo, directed by Dan Setton and Tor Ben Mayor
Showtime Networks Inc., in association with Viacom Productions Inc., and A Jersey Guys Production	Bang Bang You're Dead
Sound Portraits Productions (presented on National Public Radio)	Yiddish Radio Project
Talkback Productions for BBC America via BBC Films and Single Drama	Almost Strangers
Turner Network Television, Rosemont Productions International Ltd., Angel Brown Productions, in association with Spirit Dance Productions	Door to Door
WBEZ-FM, Chicago Public Radio	Stories of Home, produced by Alex Kotlowitz and Amy Drozdowska.
WFAA-TV/Dallas, TX	"Fake Drugs, Real Lives," a series of reports from Brett Shipp revealing contrived drug cases investigated by Dallas police
WISN-TV/Milwaukee, WI	"Sounding the Alarm," a report by Tammy Elliott and Kent Wainscott revealing the lack of effectiveness of smoke alarms on children
York Zimmerman Inc., in association with WETA-TV/Washington, D.C. (presented on PBS)	Bringing Down a Dictator

== 2003 ==
Recipient	Area of Excellence
CBS News	60 Minutes, for the report "All in the Family," (presented by Steve Kroft) which examined political and financial ties between those in the US government and winners of Defense Department contracts
NBC News	A Question of Fairness, a Tom Brokaw-led report that profiled the effects of affirmative action on the University of Michigan
Firelight Media for American Experience and WGBH-TV/Boston, MA (airing on PBS)	American Experience, for The Murder of Emmett Till
Frontline, The New York Times, and WGBH-TV/Boston, MA (airing on PBS)	Frontline, for "A Dangerous Business," which examined deaths and injuries suffered by employees of McWane, a cast-iron pipe maker (Lowell Bergman and David Barstow, correspondents)
NOVA/WGBH-TV/Boston, MA, in association with David Hickman Films, Sveriges Television and Norddeutscher Rundfunk (presented on PBS)	NOVA, for "The Elegant Universe with Brian Greene"
WNET/New York, NY, co-produced with Idéale Audience, Scorer Associates Ltd., BBC, ARTE France, Opéra National de Paris and NHK, with the participation of Musée d'Orsay, AVRO, and SVT (airing on PBS)	Great Performances, for Degas and the Dance, a documentary directed by Mischa Scorer about the painter Edgar Degas and his obsession with dancers
P.O.V./American Documentary Inc., Independent Television Service, and National Black Programming Consortium (presented on PBS)	P.O.V., for Two Towns of Jasper, a film on the Murder of James Byrd Jr. directed by Whitney Dow and Marco Williams
P.O.V./American Documentary Inc., Independent Television Service, Zula Pearl Films, and National Black Programming Consortium (presented on PBS)	P.O.V., for Flag Wars
Minnesota Public Radio in association with the San Francisco Symphony	American Mavericks, directed by Tom Voegeli and hosted by Suzanne Vega, based on the writings of Kyle Gann
WESH/Orlando, FL and The Orlando Sentinel	"Building Homes: Building Problems," a joint investigation into shoddy workmanship in Central Florida's building industry
The Irish Film Board, NPS & COBO, RTÉ, BBC, ZDF/ARTE, and YLE (presented on ARTE)	Chavez: Inside the Coup
Viacom, Kaiser Family Foundation, MTV, Noggin/The N, Dancing Toad Productions	Award for the Know HIV/AIDS and Fight For Your Rights: Protect Yourself campaigns. The award also cited the MTV documentary The Social History of HIV and Living with HIV/AIDS, an episode of The N's A Walk in Your Shoes
Viacom International, Mango Network, Nickelodeon, and MTV (presented on Nickelodeon)	Dora the Explorer
KHOU/Houston, TX	"Evidence of Errors," an investigation into mistakes made by the Houston Police Department's DNA crime lab
KMGH-TV/Denver, CO	"Honor and Betrayal: Scandal at the Academy," a series of reports examining sexual assaults at the United States Air Force Academy
The University of Memphis (presented on AETN and WKNO-TV/Memphis, TN)	Hoxie: The First Stand, a documentary by David Appleby about the integration of Arkansas' Hoxie School District
BBC (presented on BBC America)	The Office
BBC Correspondent Production (presented on BBC2)	Israel's Secret Weapon, a report by Olenka Frenkiel airing on BBC2's Correspondent series examining the secrecy behind Israel's nuclear weapons production
The NewsHour with Jim Lehrer and MacNeil/Lehrer Productions	Award for "Jobless Recovery: Non-Working Numbers," Paul Solman's report examining the inadequacy of government unemployment data
WCNC-TV/Charlotte, NC	Award for an investigation into dental clinics in North Carolina who sought millions of dollars in Medicaid reimbursement
TV Asahi	Mother Flew Away as a Kite
Bill Moyers	Personal Award for Moyers' career of "excellence in the use of television to educate, inform, and challenge received ideas"
Down to Earth Productions (presented on WEKU/Richmond, KY)	Sisters in Pain
Bachrach/Gottlieb Production (presented on Showtime)	Soldier's Girl
KRON-TV/San Francisco, CA and Young Broadcasting	Students Rising Above, a series hosted by Wendy Tokuda, reported by Noel Cisneros and Catherine Heenan, and produced by Tokuda and Dana Rebbman about at-risk high school students
Blown Deadline Productions in association with HBO Original Programming	The Wire
TV 2 (Denmark), Cinemax, HBO, and BBC	To Live is Better Than to Die, a film about HIV/AIDS in China directed by Weijun Chen
Christian Frei Filmproductions in association with Swiss National Television and Suissimage and Cinemax (presented on HBO)	War Photographer
Atlantic Public Media	Award for the Transom.org website and its showcasing of and resource for public radio producers

== 2004 ==
Recipient	Area of Excellence
CBS News	60 Minutes II, for a report by Dan Rather examining abuse and torture of prisoners by US Army and CIA personnel at Iraq's Abu Ghraib prison
National Public Radio	Award for the network's reportage of the Iraq War by Anne Garrels, Ivan Watson, Deborah Amos, Lourdes Garcia-Navarro, Emily Harris, Peter Kenyon, Phillip Reeves, Eric Westervelt, Tom Gjelten, and Mike Shuster
WNYC/New York, NY and National Public Radio	On the Media
WNYC/New York, NY and Public Radio International	Studio 360 American Icons, for the episode examining Herman Melville's Moby-Dick
Wisconsin Public Radio and Public Radio International	To the Best of Our Knowledge
Endor Productions in association with BBC and BBC America	State of Play
Hat Trick Productions and BBC America	The Kumars at No. 42
BBC Television News	Separate awards for the networks' reports on the civil war and genocide in the Sudanese region of Darfur. Andrew Harding, Ishbel Matheson, Hilary Andersson, Fergal Keane, Nicholas Witchell, Paul Wood, and Bridget Kendall reported for the BBC and Seth Doane reported for Channel One News.
Channel One News	Separate awards for the networks' reports on the civil war and genocide in the Sudanese region of Darfur. Andrew Harding, Ishbel Matheson, Hilary Andersson, Fergal Keane, Nicholas Witchell, Paul Wood, and Bridget Kendall reported for the BBC and Seth Doane reported for Channel One News.
Comedy Central	The Daily Show with Jon Stewart for Indecision 2004
WBAL-TV/Baltimore, MD	Award for an investigation by John Sherman revealing leaks of untreated sewage from a Centreville, MD treatment plant into the waters feeding Chesapeake Bay and motivations by area political and business officials to cover it up
WTVF/Nashville, TN	"Friends in High Places," a multi-year investigation led by Phil Williams, Bryan Staples, and Chris Clark into the awarding of no-bid state contracts to friends of former Tennessee governor Don Sundquist
WFAA-TV/Dallas, TX	State of Denial, a multi-part series reported by Brett Shipp investigating questionable practices by state agencies and major insurance companies involved with the Texas workers compensation system
Filmmakers Collaborative, Blueberry Hill Productions for American Experience, WGBH-TV/Boston, MA	American Experience, for Tupperware! a film by Laurie Kahn about the namesake product
Televisió de Catalunya and Bausan Films in association with Cinemax Reel Life	Balseros
Zazen Productions in association with Cinemax Reel Life	Bus 174
Clinica Estetico and LisaGay Inc. in association with HBO	Beah: A Black Woman Speaks
Cort/Madden Productions in association with HBO Films	Something the Lord Made
Red Board Productions and Paramount Television in association with HBO Entertainment	Deadwood
Discovery Channel and Vulcan Productions in association with Gemini Productions and Antenna Film	Black Sky: The Race For Space
Howe Sound Films and Force Four Entertainment in association with CBC	Human Cargo
CultureWorks and the WFMT Radio Network	Leonard Bernstein: An American Life, hosted by Susan Sarandon and produced by Steve Rowland
The Rhythm and Blues Foundation and Public Radio International	Let the Good Times Roll, a series on rhythm and blues hosted by Jerry Butler and produced by Alexis Gillespie
Link TV	Mosaic: World News from the Middle East
Nursery Tap, LLC	Nursery Tap, Hip to Toe, a children's show about the performing arts created by Juleen Murray Shaw
Grant Tinker	Personal Award for his work as CEO of MTM Enterprises and chairman/CEO of NBC
Bill Brummel Productions for The History Channel	Rwanda: Do Scars Ever Fade?, a film about the Rwandan genocide produced by Paul Freedman
Univision	Award for "Salud es Vida...Enterate!" ("Lead a Healthy Life...Get the Facts!") the broadcaster's initiative to promote health issues to the Latino community
Sesame Workshop, Kwasukasukela, and South African Broadcasting Corporation	Takalani Sesame Presents "talk to me...", a campaign promoting discussions about HIV/AIDS with children
CNBC	The Age of Wal-Mart: Inside America's Most Powerful Company, reported by David Faber
WITI/Milwaukee, WI	"The Bully Project," an "investigation-turned-community-outreach-program" by Bob Segall examining the issue of school bullying
Trio and Post Consumer Media	The N-Word

== 2005 ==
Recipient	Area of Excellence
WLOX/Biloxi, MS	coverage of Hurricane Katrina and its aftermath
WWL-TV/New Orleans, LA	coverage of Hurricane Katrina and its aftermath
NBC News	coverage of Hurricane Katrina and its aftermath, highlighting (among others) the reporting of Brian Williams, Lisa Myers, Martin Savidge, and Carl Quintanilla
CNN	coverage of Hurricane Katrina and its aftermath, highlighting (among others) the reporting of Sanjay Gupta, Drew Griffin, Elizabeth Cohen, Beth Nissen, and Paula Zahn
TVE	China: A Million Steps Ahead, a documentary directed by Juan-Antonio Sacaluga about urbanization in China
Robert Kenner Films, WGBH Educational Foundation, Wisconsin Public Television, Playtone, and BBC	American Experience, for Two Days in October
BBC	This World, for Bad Medicine, a report by Olenka Frenkiel on counterfeit drugs in Nigeria
BBC and BBC America	Viva Blackpool
BBC, BBC Factual and Learning, and BBC Drama	BBC DoNation Season, a programming initiative to promote awareness of organ donations that included Life on the List, a series of documentaries and an episode of Casualty@Holby City
BBC, in association with HBO Documentary Films	Children of Beslan, about the Beslan school hostage crisis
BBC and WGBH-TV/Boston, MA (co-production) in association with Deep Indigo	Bleak House
WNET/New York, NY, Grey Water Park Productions, Spitfire Pictures, and Cappa/DeFina Productions, in co-production with Vulcan Productions, BBC/Arena, and NHK	American Masters, for No Direction Home — Bob Dylan
Deeble and Stone Productions, NHK, WNET/New York, NY, Granada International, BBC and ZDF	The Queen of Trees
P.O.V./American Documentary, Inc., Independent Television Service, and Realside Productions	P.O.V., for Chisholm '72: Unbought & Unbossed
Independent Television Service	A Room Nearby, directed by Paul Fierlinger
David E. Kelley Productions in association with 20th Century Fox Television	Boston Legal
Heel and Toe Films, Shore Z Productions, and Bad Hat Harry Productions, in association with NBC Universal Television Studios	House
Red House Entertainment for Showtime Original Pictures	Edge of America, directed by Chris Eyre
Comedy Central	South Park
Canadian Broadcasting Corporation	The Wire: The Impact of Electricity on Music
CBC/Radio-Canada La Première Chaîne	What If Winter Never Comes? (Et si l'hiver ne venait plus?)
HBO Family	Classical Baby
KNBC/Los Angeles, CA	"Burning Questions", a report exposing environmental concerns at a large commercial/residential building project
KCNC-TV/Denver, CO	"How Far Will the Army Go?" a report revealing how U.S. Army recruitment officers instruct potential recruits on how to falsify school grades, diplomas, and drug tests
KCET/Los Angeles, CA in association with Sesame Workshop and 44 Blue Productions, Inc.	'A Place of Our Own (Los Ninos en Su Casa)
WNYC/New York, NY	Award for the Radio Rookies Project
KMEX-DT/Los Angeles, CA	15% of the United States, a series of reports dealing with issues of the Latino community
Documania Films, Sierra Tango Productions, and The History Channel	Save Our History: Voices of Civil Rights
Maha Films (aired on Sundance Channel)	The Staircase
Distant Horizon/Videovision Entertainment, Anant Singh, Nelson Mandela Foundation, M-Net Exciting Film, and National Film and Video Foundation of South Africa, in association with HBO Films	Yesterday
Fox Television Studios in association with Sony Pictures Television	The Shield
R&D TV in association with NBC Universal Television Studios	Battlestar Galactica

== 2006 ==
Recipient	Area of Excellence
Charlotte Street Films, CBC, BBC, ARTE GEIE TV, TV 2, Yle TV2, WDR TV, VRT TV, SVT, VPRO, NRK, ETV, TVE, and European Union Media Plus Program	Why We Fight
mun2	For My Country? Latinos in the Military, produced and directed by Alison Fast and Moises Velez
WTNH/New Haven, CT	Award for an investigative report by Alan Cohn revealing defective parts on UH-60 Black Hawk utility helicopters
NPR	"Mental Anguish and the Military," an All Things Considered report by Daniel Zwerdling revealing harassment and ostracizing of Iraqi War veterans at Fort Collins, Colorado who sought out treatment for mental health problems
WISH-TV/Indianapolis, IN	"Command Mistake," a report produced by Karen Hensel examining an improvised explosive device's effect on an Iraqi War veteran as well as lack of protective padding in soldiers' helmets
HBO Documentary Films in association with Feury/Grant Productions and Downtown Community Television Center	Baghdad ER
HBO Documentary Films in association with 40 Acres	When the Levees Broke: A Requiem in Four Acts
HBO Family	The Music in Me, a documentary on young musicians directed by Amy Schatz, Mark Mannucci, Ellen Goosenberg Kent, Diane Kolyer, and Mark Benjamin
HBO Sports	Billie Jean King: Portrait of a Pioneer, produced by Margaret Grossi
Company Pictures and Channel 4 in association with HBO Films	Elizabeth I
BBC, BBC Two, BBC Worldwide, and National Geographic	Galápagos, for the episode "Born of Fire"
BBC, BBC America, and Talkback Thames	Gideon's Daughter
Listen Up! Youth Media Network, Polimorfo, iEarn Sierra Leone, La Camioneta, Sawtona, Frame by Frame Fierce, Light House, Spy Hop Productions, Our Voice, and Evanston Township High School	Beyond Borders: Personal Stories from a Small Planet, directed by Austin Haeberle (airing on IFC)
WTHR/Indianapolis, IN	Award for the investigative reports by Bob Segall "Prescription Privacy" (inadequate disposal of customer prescription records by pharmacies) and "Cause for Alarm" (condition of tornado sirens in central Indiana)
MediaRites Productions (airing on Public Radio International)	Crossing East: Our History, Our Stories, Our America, a radio documentary directed by Dmae Roberts and hosted by George Takei and Margaret Cho
ABC News (World News Tonight, Nightline, and ABCNews.com/Blotter)	"Conduct Unbecoming," an investigation headed by Brian Ross that verified sexually inappropriate messages sent to congressional pages by Florida Representative Mark Foley
PJ Productions for ABC News	Out of Control: AIDS in Black America, reported by Peter Jennings and Terry Moran
Chocolate Moose Media, Inc. and Quintet Productions	Award for The Three Amigos Campaign, a program to build awareness of condom use to prevent HIV/AIDS
HearingVoices.com (aired on KUNM-FM)	Award for Crossing Borders, a radio documentary hosted by Marcos Martinez and reported by Luis Alberto Urrea, Scott Carrier, Ann Heppermann, Kara Oehler, Guillermo Gómez-Peña, Siamack Sioshansi, and Bronwyn Ximm chronicling stories and the impact of illegal immigrants from Mexico to the United States
Touchstone Television (aired on NBC)	Scrubs, for the episode "My Way Home"
Touchstone Television (aired on ABC)	Ugly Betty
Be Square Productions, Inc.	Good Eats (airing on Food Network)
Apartment 11 Productions, CBC Newsworld, RDI, Knowledge Network, and Canadian Television Fund	Braindamadj'd...Take II, a documentary directed by Paul Nadler about his recovery from a car crash
Showtime and Mandalay Television	Brotherhood
KMOV/St Louis, MO	"Left Behind: The Failure of East St. Louis Schools", reported by Craig Cheatham
Dateline NBC (NBC News)	"The Education of Ms. Groves" (Hoda Kotb, correspondent) which profiled the struggles of a Teach for America volunteer and her Atlanta middle school class
WBEZ/Chicago, IL	This American Life, for "Habeas Schmabeas," (reported by Joseph Margulies, Jack Hitt, and Jon Ronson) which examined abuses of Habeas corpus rights
Magic Lantern Productions and Channel 4	Award for the FourDocs website
The Washington Post and WashingtonPost.com	Award for "Being a Black Man," a print and online series reported by Ben de la Cruz and Hamil Harris profiling the lives of contemporary black males
StoryCorps	Award to the organization for its "preservation of ideas and emotions, events and experiences"
Steeplechase Films, Inc., High Line Productions, Daniel Wolf, Inc., and WNET/New York, NY	American Masters, for Andy Warhol: A Documentary Film
60 Minutes (CBS News)	Award for a report by Ed Bradley revealing conflicting testimony and botched and/or unethical police and legal procedures surrounding the Duke University rape scandal
Rebel Base and Sony Pictures Television	The Boondocks, for the episode "Return of the King"
NBC Universal Television in association with Imagine Entertainment and Film 44	Friday Night Lights
Reveille Productions in association with NBC Universal Television	The Office

== 2007 ==
Recipient	Area of Excellence
ABC News	Bob Woodruff Reporting: Wounds of War – The Long Road Home of Our Nation's Veterans
Partisan Pictures, Inc. and WNET/New York, NY	Nature, for Silence of the Bees, produced by Doug Shultz
mtvU	Award for Half of Us, an initiative to promote awareness of depression among college students (produced by Sophia Cranshaw and Stephanie Wang Breal)
BBC World, BBC America, and BBC World News America	"White Horse Village," which profiled a "verdant, sleepy, near-feudal" hamlet in the Chinese interior and its dealings with modernity's encroachment (Carrie Gracie, correspondent)
WNYC/New York, NY	The Brian Lehrer Show
HBO Documentary Films in association with Priddy Brothers	To Die in Jerusalem
KNXV-TV/Phoenix, AZ	"Security Risks at Sky Harbor," a report by Lisa Fletcher revealing TSA lapses at the Phoenix airport
Robert Levi Films, Independent Television Service, and Washington Square Films	Independent Lens, for Billy Strayhorn – Lush Life
Vixen Films and Independent Television Service	Sisters in Law (airing on Independent Lens)
WSLS-TV/Roanoke, VA	Award for the station's breaking news coverage of the shootings at Virginia Tech and its immediate aftermath (reported by Johanna Calfee, Jeremy Crider, Rosa Duarte, Denise Eck, Angela Hatcher, Lindsey Henley, Dawn Jefferies, Scott Leamon, Ashley Roberts, and Jay Warren)
Univision Communications	Award for Ya Es Hora ("It's Time"), a public service initiative encouraging citizenship applications and voter registration by legal US immigrants, working with NALEO, NCLR, impreMedia and the SEIU, (with Maria Elena Salinas, Ana Maria Canseco, Fernando Fiore, Lilia Rodriguez-Luciano, Lili Estefan, Raul De Molina, Alejandra Espinoza, and Raul Peimbert)
Texas Heritage Music Foundation	Whole Lotta Shakin`, a radio series produced by Alex Gillespie on rockabilly
American Public Media	Speaking of Faith: The Ecstatic Faith of Rumi
American Public Media and San Francisco Symphony	The MTT Files, a radio series hosted by Michael Tilson Thomas
Bravo, The Weinstein Company, The Magical Elves, and Full Picture Entertainment	Project Runway
Craft in America, Inc.	Craft in America (airing on PBS)
NOVA/WGBH Educational Foundation, Vulcan Productions, Inc., and The Big Table Film Company	Judgment Day: Intelligent Design on Trial
CBS News	Sunday Morning, for "The Way Home," in which Kimberly Dozier interviewed two US servicewomen who lost limbs while in combat action in Iraq
60 Minutes (CBS News)	"The Killings in Haditha," in which Scott Pelley investigated the 2005 massacre at the hands of a U.S. Marine squad in the western Iraqi city
Discovery Channel and BBC	Planet Earth
Hello Doggie, Inc, Busboy Productions, and Spartina Productions	The Colbert Report
National Public Radio, Chicago Public Radio, and Urgent Haircut Productions	Wait Wait... Don't Tell Me!
AMC and Lionsgate Television	Mad Men
WGBH Educational Foundation	Design Squad
WFAA/Dallas, TX	Award for the investigative reports "Money for Nothing" (a probe by Byron Harris of fraudulent loans made by the Export-Import Bank of the United States), "The Buried and the Dead" (health and safety hazards of underground gas couplings, reported by Brett Shipp), "Television Justice" (how the Murphy Police Dept. accommodated NBC's To Catch a Predator stings, reported by Byron Harris), and "Kinder Prison" (treatment of women and children detained at a federal immigration facility, reported by Brett Shipp)
Jigsaw Pictures, Tall Woods, Wider Film, and ZDF/Arte	Taxi to the Dark Side
Center for Emerging Media	Just Words (produced by Jessica Phillips and broadcast by WYPR)
WTAE-TV/Pittsburgh, PA	"Fight for Open Records", a series of reports by Jim Parsons revealing mismanagement and fund misappropriation within the Pennsylvania Higher Education Assistance Association; the reports occurred only after a lengthy battle to have PHEAA financial records opened
bTV	A Journey Across Afghanistan: Opium and Roses, produced by Venelin Petkov
Frontline, Kirk Documentary Group, Ltd., and WGBH-TV/Boston, MA	Frontline, for Cheney's Law, on Dick Cheney, produced by Michael Kirk and Jim Gilmore
Showtime, John Goldwyn Productions, The Colleton Company, and Clyde Phillips Productions	Dexter
CNN	CNN Presents: God's Warriors
Art 21, Inc.	Art 21 – Art in the 21st Century (airing on PBS)
Public Road Productions and Wieden & Kennedy(aired on Sundance Channel)	Nimrod Nation, directed by Brett Morgen
Universal Media Studios in association with Broadway Video Television and Little Stranger, Inc.	30 Rock

== 2008 ==
Recipient	Area of Excellence
Sichuan Television	Award for coverage of the Sichuan earthquake
NPR	Award for on-scene coverage by Melissa Block and Robert Siegel from Chengdu, China during and after the Sichuan earthquake
NPR	"36 Years in Solitary: Murder, Death and Justice on Angola", a report by Laura Sullivan which questioned the role of two prisoners in a guard's 1972 murder at Louisiana State Penitentiary
Chicago Public Radio and the news division of NPR	This American Life, for "The Giant Pool of Money," which looked at the early stages of the subprime mortgage crisis
Leverage and Closest to the Hole Productions in association with HBO Entertainment	Entourage
HBO Documentary Films in association with Vermillion Films, Inc.	Hear and Now
Maysles Films in association with HBO Documentary Films and CVJ	The Gates
Ted Leonsis Productions in association with HBO Documentary Films	Nanking
Playtone in association with HBO Films	John Adams
WWL-TV/New Orleans, LA	Award for a series of reports by Lee Zurik exposing questionable financial practices by the New Orleans Affordable Homeownership program
The New York Times	Award for the newspaper's website (NYTimes.com) and its innovations in online journalism, highlighting "Choosing a President" and the reporting of Lizette Alvarez, Shayla Harris, Rob Harris, Katharine Q. Seelye, and Ben Werschkul
Kartemquin Educational Films and Independent Television Service	Independent Lens, for Mapping Stem Cell Research: Terra Incognita
Mosaic Films, Independent Television Service, and Corporation for Public Broadcasting	Independent Lens, for King Corn
Laboratory X, Inc., American Documentary, Inc., P.O.V., Center for Asian American Media, and PBS	POV, for Campaign, a documentary by Kazuhiro Soda about a Liberal Democratic Party candidate for a city council seat in a suburb of Tokyo
SNL Studios in association with Broadway Video	Saturday Night Live, for its 2008 political satire
ABC News	Hopkins
ABC Studios	Lost
WETA-TV/Washington, DC and PBS	Washington Week with Gwen Ifill & National Journal
The Metropolitan Opera Association in association with PBS and WNET/New York, NY	The Metropolitan Opera: Live in HD Series
NBC Nightly News	"Tip of the Spear," a series of reports with Richard Engel following a military unit in Afghanistan
YouTube	Award to the Google independent subsidiary and its "promoting a free exchange of ideas... around the world"
NDR Fernsehen and Shanghai Media Group	The Red Race, about the training of gymnasts in China
Korean Broadcasting System	Jungle Fish
Hearst-Argyle Television	Institutional Award for "Commitment 2008," in which Hearst-Argyle stations devoted at least 10 minutes per day to candidate and issues coverage in the 30 days leading to the 2008 elections
Turner Classic Movies	Institutional Award to the classic film network and its commitment to "the place of film in social and cultural experience"
The Onion	Award for Onion News Network
60 Minutes (CBS News)	"Lifeline," a report by Scott Pelley profiling operations of Remote Area Medical in the United States
WGBH-TV (Boston, MA)/NOVA, National Geographic Television, and John Rubin Productions, Inc.	Ape Genius
Sony Pictures Television, High Bridge Productions, and Gran Via Productions	Breaking Bad
ESPN Films and Shoot the Moon Productions	Black Magic
NBC and Zhang Yimou	Award for the opening ceremony of the Beijing Olympics
KMGH-TV/Denver, CO	"Failing the Children: Deadly Mistakes," which uncovered systemic inadequacies (and tragic results) in the Denver area foster care system
KLAS-TV/Las Vegas, NV	Crossfire: Water, Power and Politics, a documentary that examined the effect of plans to pump water from rural Nevada to the Las Vegas area
Twin Cities Public Television and WGBH-TV/Boston, MA	Depression: Out of the Shadows
Nickelodeon	Avatar: The Last Airbender
CNN	Award for the network's coverage of the 2008 Presidential primary campaigns and debates

== 2009 ==
Recipient	Area of Excellence
Diane Rehm	Personal Award for her work on her eponymous talk show
Twentieth Century Fox Television	Glee
Twentieth Century Fox Television in association with Levitan Lloyd Productions	Modern Family
60 Minutes (CBS News)	"Sabotaging the System," a report examining the dangers of cyber terrorism
60 Minutes (CBS News)	"The Co$t of Dying," a report examining the financial costs of end-of-life care
Sesame Workshop	Award for the SesameStreet.org website
KHOU/Houston, TX and Belo, Inc.	"Under Fire," a report revealing gender discrimination and corruption within the Texas National Guard
Folly River Inc. and ITVS	Independent Lens, for "The Order of Myths"
Green Fuse Films and ITVS	Independent Lens, for "Between the Folds"
National Public Radio	Award for Soraya Sarhaddi Nelson's reports from Afghanistan
National Public Radio	Award for the NPR.org website
Daybreak, Channel 4, and Target Entertainment (presented on PBS' Masterpiece by WGBH-TV/Boston, MA)	Endgame
Brook Lapping Productions	Iran & The West
Frontline and Rain Media	The Madoff Affair
GMA Network	I-Witness, for "Ambulansiyang De Paa" ("Ambulance on Foot"), which highlighted low-level health care in the Philippine village of Bansud
Nancy Solomon	Award to the independent producer for the public radio documentary Mind the Gap: Why Good Schools are Failing Black Students, distributed on Public Radio Exchange
Korean Broadcasting System	Noodle Road: Connecting Asia's Kitchens
WFLD-TV/Chicago, IL (Fox Chicago News and MyFoxChicago.com)	Award for the station's coverage of the fatal beating of Derrion Albert and its website's complementary content
Peter Jones Productions (aired on PBS)	Inventing LA: The Chandlers and Their Times
Trey Kay Productions (presented on West Virginia Public Broadcasting)	The Great Textbook War
ABC News	A Hidden America: Children of the Mountains
A Goldhawk Essential Production and BBC World Service	The Day That Lehman Died
BBC America	BBC World News America
BBC America, BBC World News, and BBC World News America	"Where Giving Life is a Death Sentence," a report on the maternal mortality rate in Badakhshan Province, Afghanistan
Mirage Enterprises and Cinechicks, in association with The Weinstein Company, BBC, and HBO Entertainment	The No. 1 Ladies' Detective Agency
Leverage, Closest to the Hole Productions, and Sheleg, in association with HBO Entertainment	In Treatment
Darlow Smithson Productions, HBO Sports, and HBO Documentary Films	Thrilla in Manila
Worldwide Pants, Inc.	The Late Late Show with Craig Ferguson, for the episode featuring Archbishop Desmond Tutu
KTVU/Oakland, CA	Award for the station's coverage of the BART Police shooting of Oscar Grant, its aftermath and investigation
KCET/Los Angeles, CA	Up In Smoke, a series of reports on SoCal Connected concerning issues of marijuana in California
Oregon Public Broadcasting	Hard Times, a series of OPB Radio reports on the effects of unemployment in Oregon
WYFF/Greenville, SC	Chronicle, for "Paul’s Gift," which examined the process of organ donation after a donor's death
Vanguard (Current TV)	The OxyContin Express, which examined Oxycodone prescriptions by Florida doctors and its wide-ranging effects
NOW-TV News	Sichuan earthquake: One Year On
Sundance Channel and Brick City TV, LLC	Brick City
WNET/New York, NY	American Masters, for Jerome Robbins – Something to Dance About

== See also ==
- The Pulitzer Prizes
- Academy Award for Best Documentary Feature
- Primetime Emmy Awards
