= Iosua Tai Taeoalii =

American artist

Tai Taeoalii (born July 14, 1977) is an American/Samoan filmmaker and mixed-media artist.

== Biography ==
In the early 1980s, growing up biracial in the suburbs of Salt Lake City, Utah, Tai self-identified as an outcast. He experienced some turbulent teenage years but says he was fortunate to discover that the arts were a remedy to expressing his frustrations. Tai experimented with a variety of art-forms, including graffiti, tattoo, music & film. He received awards for filmmaking, but Tai has stated that a ballpoint pen is his favorite medium.

In the early 2000s Tai founded Weird Chief Pictures, a film and television production company in Salt Lake City, Utah. Tai had been producing film and television for roughly 10 years before eventually putting his filmmaking career aside to focus on his artwork. His most notable production credits include the Ultimate Combat Experience and 3.2 Percent. In 2008 he wrote, produced and directed his fourth and final feature film entitled Darkroom, with starring roles by Darren Dalton and David Stevens and a cameo role from Todd Bridges.

Between 2002 and 2008, under the moniker 'Weird Chief' Tai sold an estimated 5,000 pop art paintings of pop icons made using stencils and spraypaint, with at least one sale in each of the 50 U.S. states and Israel, Cyprus, Australia, Austria, Belgium, the Czech Republic, Finland, France, Germany, Iceland, Japan, Lithuania, the UK, Slovenia, Switzerland, Turkey, South Africa, and New Zealand. In 2009, combining urban and surreal styles, he transitioned from pop art to a pop surrealism style, experimenting with a mix of ballpoint pen, photography, spray paint, stencils, acrylics, marker inks, and watercolors, applied on plywood.

In 2010 Tai founded Submerged in Art, an annual charity event gathering of Art and Music to benefit The Road Home homeless shelter. In just its 3rd year, the 2012 Submerged in Art charity event received a "Best Of" award from Salt Lake City Weekly.

In 2017 Tai was invited to exhibit his solo show “thINK” at Gallery UnderTaci in Aarhus, Denmark, marking his first international solo exhibit. In 2018 Tai was bestowed the honor of a “Matai” chief title, “Luamanuvae”, in his family's village in Savaii, Samoa. In May 2019, Tai's animal revolt series “I Am Animal” was featured at the Moniker Art Fair in New York City through the Philadelphia gallery Analog Contemporary. In 2019 & 2020 Tai's series “I Am Animal” had its France debut and was on exhibit for several months at all three of the SpaceJunk Art Center galleries in Lyon, Bayonne and Grenoble.

During the COVID-19 pandemic, Taeoalii renovated an 1851 pre-civil war home into his own studio and gallery with rentable Airbnb loft in Hannibal, Missouri. He also taught remote drawing classes and released two books. The first was a children's book, co-created with his wife, entitled Beyond the Sea and the second was a coffee table book of his drawings of tentacles, entitled Book of Arms.

In 2021 Tai launched a podcast and YouTube web series called DOD45 (Drawing Over Discussions) where he interviews guests for 45 minutes while drawing a picture for them. Past guests include Sage Francis, Ceschi, Awol One, Doseone, Ron Allen, B. Dolan, Illogic, Carlos Condit, Moodie Black, Factor Chandelier, DJ Hoppa, Sole, Greg Lutzka, Blockhead, DJ Qbert, Prolyphic, Yoni Wolf, Mr. Dibbs & Slug of Atmosphere.

== Art ==
=== Early art ===
Tai has told stories of being in elementary school and drawing pictures for his friends, selling them for a quarter or more. As a juvenile, he was arrested for his graffiti and was encouraged by the arresting officer to compete in an anti-graffiti/anti-gang drawing competition, which he won and used part of his earnings from the competition to pay off the graffiti violation fines.

=== 2005-2008 ===
Tai started with many different art mediums including tattoo, graffiti, web design, graphic, illustration, sculpture, oils, acrylics, music and film. In 2004, Tai was asked to help paint a 30 ft x 50 ft mural with American Pop Artist Jann Haworth, who is best known as the co-creator of The Beatles' Sgt. Pepper's Lonely Hearts Club Band album cover. The mural was an updated representation of the Sgt. Pepper's Lonely Hearts Club Band album cover and is titled SLC Pepper. This mural inspired Tai to seek new techniques, at which time he was introduced to stencil art. Tai spent the following years focused on his stencil work. In 2005 he painted a tryptic painting of Miles Davis, Erykah Badu and Billie Holiday, listed the piece on eBay, and in a short time the painting sold. Although still considered lowbrow, Pop art had become very popular in the early 2000s, especially with the younger generation, and from 2005 to 2008 Tai used eBay to sell his paintings to collectors across the world.

=== 2008-2012 ===
In 2008, Tai began showing his work at art festivals. His first festival was the 2008 Utah Arts Festival, where he sold nearly 300 original 20"x30" pop art paintings. For the most part of 2008 and 2009 Tai only sold his work in the western United States, but in late 2009 Tai took his work across the entire country . As of 2009, Tai has been traveling across the country for nearly 8 months out of a year, selling his work to collectors.

=== Pop Art ===
Tai's pop art paintings were created with the use of spraypaint, stencils and masonite. The images were designed in photoshop, turning digital photos into multilayered images. The layers were printed out onto mylar paper and then handcut with an Exacto knife, resulting in multi-layered stencils. Each stencil layer was sprayed with a temporary adhesive, mounted on the masonite, then sprayed with aerosol spraypaint. Multiple layers were applied, completing the image. The backgrounds were painted with additional stencil use, freehand aerosol techniques and sometimes acrylic application with a brush.

=== Pop Surrealism Art ===
Tai's recent artworks are surreal creations of ballpoint pen drawings on Mylar film including further highlights, details and background colors created with the use of pencils, charcoals and a drizzle of watercolors. In the past, Tai's surreal drawings have also been created on watercolor paper, canvas and plywood. Tai has stated that he prefers hotel pens and was recently rewarded with a case of his own personal pens, provided by Bic.

=== Art Festivals, Galleries and Awards ===
- 2022 Art in the Pearl (OR), 2022 Best in Show Award
- 2022 Art Fair in the Square (WI), 2022 Best in Show Award
- 2021 Artigras (FL), 2021 1st Place Award
- 2019 Uptown Art Fair (MN), 2019 Best of Show Award
- 2019 Lake Wells Festival of the Arts (FL), 2019 Award of Distinction
- 2017 Fort Worth Main Street Art Festival (TX), 2017 People's Choice Award
- 2018 Uptown Art Fair (MN), 2018 Top 10% Award
- 2018 Art Fair on the Square (WI), 2018 Invitational Award
- 2017 Schlafly Art Outside (MO), 2017 3rd Place Award
- 2017 Utah Art Festival (UT), 2017 Juror Award
- 2017 Three Rivers Art Festival (PA), 2017 Juror Award
- 2017 East Lansing Art Festival (MI), 2017 Honorary Award
- 2016 East Lake View Festival of the Arts (IL), 2016 Best in Show Award
- 2017 Fort Worth Main Street Art Festival (TX), 2017 Juror Award
- 2016 Festival International (LA), 2016 3rd Place Best in Show Award
- 2016 Kentuck Festival of the Arts (AL), 2016 Award of Merit
- 2016 Winter Park Art Festival (FL), 2016 Award of Merit
- 2013, 2014 Covington Three Rivers Art Festival (LA), 2014 Award of Distinction / 2014 Best Display Award
- 2015 Baton Rouge Fest4All (LA), 2015 Award of Excellence
- 2015 Brookside Art Annual (MO), 2015 Best of Show
- 2014, 2015 Artisphere (SC), 2014 2nd Place Award
- 2014, 2015 Schlafly Art Outside (MO), 2014 Best of Show
- 2013, 2014, Wells Street Art Festival (IL), 2013 1st Place Mixed Media / 2014 1st Place Mixed Media
- 2013 Art Fair on the Square (Madison) (WI), 2013 Invitational Award
- 2012, 2013, 2015 Plaza Art Fair (MO), 2015 Award of Excellence
- 2011 Artfest Boca (FL), 1st Place Drawing Category
- 2010, 2011, 2012, 2013, 2014, 2015 Red River Revel (LA), 2014 Best of Show / 2015 Jury Award
- 2011 Ann Arbor Summer Art Fair (MI), Best of Show
- 2011 Highland Fest (MN), Best of Show
- 2010 Castle Rock Artfest (CO), 1st Place Mixed Media
- 2010, 2011, 2012 South Miami Arts Festival (FL), 2010 Best in Show, 1st Place Mixed Media / 2012 1st Place Mixed Media
- 2010, 2011, 2012 Art in the Park Plantation (FL), 2010 1st Place Mixed Media / 2012 1st Place Mixed Media
- 2010 Funky Ferndale (MI), Award of Merit
- 2011, 2012, 2013, 2014, 2015 Uptown Art Fair (MN), 2012 Award of Merit

== Film and video ==
Born to a middle-class family in Salt Lake City, Utah, Tai spent his childhood drawing and shooting short videos, and at 18 he went on to study film at the University of Utah, where he first made the transition to producing short films. After dropping out of college he went on to produce his first feature-length film Luck & Rat Poisoning (1995), which was heavily influenced by Kevin Smith's Clerks. After Luck & Rat Poisoning's theatrical release at Utah's historic Tower Theatre, which serves as a venue for the Sundance Film Festival, Tai produced and directed his second feature-length movie, Hustlin' a Hustler (1996), which he shot on hi-8 video, on what could be considered as a "used car" budget.

In 2001, Tai began production on his 3rd feature-length picture, but his first on celluloid (his earliest works were shot on video). Shot on Super 16mm, Twice Today, starring Don Shanks, was invited to the AngelCiti Film Festival in Los Angeles, California where it had its premier at Paramount Studios. In July 2002, Twice Today was also invited to the Real to Reel Film Festival in Shelby, North Carolina, where it won the award for Best Amateur Feature Film.

After Twice Today, Tai transitioned into television. From 2003 to 2006 Tai was hired to edit the Ultimate Combat Experience, a weekly television series featuring tournaments of kickboxing and no holds barred fighting, credited as being the first MMA show of its kind on network television anywhere in the world. After editing several episodes of UCE, Tai was promoted to a producer, where he produced and edited 52 episodes over a 5-season period.

In 2006, after leaving the Ultimate Combat Experience, Tai produced and edited commercials and promotional material for Ultimate Fighting Championship's two-time light heavy weight champion Randy Couture and Matt Lindland's training camp Team Quest and MMA event, Sportfight.

From 2004 to 2006, Tai also worked on his weekly television series called 3.2 Percent, which highlighted the nightlife, music, sports, culture and lifestyle in Utah. In corroboration with early Spy Hop Production personnel, Tai produced an 11-episode season in 2006.

Citing unsustainable financial conditions, Tai cancelled the 3.2 Percent television series, after just one season. In December 2005, Tai returned to filmmaking and was hired to produce and direct a short film for the 2006 Slamdance Film Festival, with specific guidelines. It had to be shot in 24 hours, with a budget of $99 and a running time of 3 minutes. The finished short was titled Waiting, starring David H. Stevens of Punch Drunk Love and after its premiere at the Slamdance Film Festival, it was invited to screen at the 2006 Real to Reel Film Festival and the 2006 Arizona International Film Festival.

Following the Slamdance premiere of Waiting, Tai adapted the short story into a feature-length film. Two years later, Tai began production on Darkroom. Tai's fourth feature-length film, Darkroom, stars David Stevens, Darren Dalton and Todd Bridges. In 2008, Darkroom made its way through the film festival circuit, screening at the 2008 Big Muddy Film Festival, IL, Okanagan Film Festival, Canada, Big Island Film Festival, HI, Bare Bones Film Festival, OK, and the Dances With Films Festival, CA. In 2011, Darkroom was picked up by Vanguard Cinema for DVD distribution.

From 2011 to 2012 Tai edited commercials, promo videos and Episode 1 for Showdown Fights, which aired on Fox Sports Net in 2012 and is an MMA event in Orem, Utah that has featured and features professional and amateur fighters from across the country, including UFC contenders and popular up-and-comers such as Josh Burkman, Jeremy Horn, Junie Browning, Court McGee, Jordan Smith and Steven Siler.

=== Filmography ===
- Showdown Fights - Episode 1 on Fox Sports Net (television) - 2012
- Darkroom (feature) - 2007
- Waiting (short) - 2006
- 3.2 Percent (television)

(episodes 1 to 11) - 2004/2005

- Ku Klux Klan - How they promote Racial Inequality (short) - 2004
- SportFight Intro (commercial) - 2004
- U92 Video Countdown (pilot) - 2004
- Truth or Dare (pilot) - 2004
- Fresh Start Ministry (pilot) - 2004
- Water in the Desert (short) - 2004
- No News is Good News (short) - 2004
- Ultimate Combat Experience (television)

(episode 9 to 52) - 2000/2004

- All I've Got (2004 Olympic promo video) - 2002
- Twice Today (feature) - 2000
- Hustlin' a Hustler (feature) - 1998
- Luck & Rat Poisoning (feature) - 1996

=== Weird Chief Pictures ===
Weird Chief Pictures was founded by Tai Taeoalii in 1996. It was an independent film production company that had also expanded into all aspects of media, entertainment and the arts. As of 2013, Tai has suspended all of Weird Chief Pictures' business dealings, citing his need to focus on his recent artistic endeavors, of which he operates business now as 'Art by Tai'.
