= Learning Matters =

Learning Matters may refer to

- a British publishing company, now an imprint of SAGE Publishing
- an American production company founded by John Merrow, now acquired by Education Week.
