= The Dying Rooms =

- Directed by: Kate Blewett; Brian Woods
- Production company: Lauderdale Production
- Distributed by: Channel 4
- Release date: 1995
- Running time: 38 minutes
- Country: United Kingdom
- Language: English

The Dying Rooms is a 1995 television documentary film about Chinese state orphanages. It was directed by Kate Blewett and Brian Woods and produced by Lauderdale Productions. It first aired on Channel 4 in the United Kingdom and then, re-aired on Cinemax. A follow-up film, Return to the Dying Rooms, was released in 1996. That same year, the film won a Peabody Award. It also won a News & Documentary Emmy Award.

== Synopsis ==
In the film, Blewett and others travel to mainland China to visit orphanages housing children abandoned due to the "one-child policy". The filmmakers stated that unwanted female and disabled children were left to die of neglect, allowing parents to have another child. While filming, the crew used hidden cameras to collect footage, and Blewett used a false name when visiting the orphanages.

== Reportage ==
On top of the dying rooms, other types of abuses by the orphanages were shown. Such as leaving infants to fend by themselves for hours, squeezing them in tight cribs in between other babies, or, as shown on the cover, tying toddlers to chairs, that also allowed them to urinate and eliminate into buckets, for unknown amounts of time.

The documentary highlighted the significant disparity in treatment between different institutions. Private orphanages, powered by private donations, appeared to be functional and employed seemingly qualified staff. Meanwhile, public orphanages lacked or misused funds, leaving them understaffed and with the little staff having no infant care training. The hygienic conditions were critical, and no controls ensued to verify any standard safety protocol was followed. One of the rural orphanages had claims to have taken over 400 baby girls in a year, but the reporters could spot fewer than 20. It is presumed the majority of them died in the dying rooms due to the spread of a virus.

The documentary showcased a girl held within one of the dying rooms. She was very malnourished and evidently had not been cleaned or cared for in days. When asked what the girl's name was, the staff replied "Mei Ming" (Chinese: 没名), which in English translates to "No Name". Due to neglect, she died four days after she was filmed. Upon calling for follow-up a few weeks later, the orphanage claimed no such child ever existed. The documentary was subsequently dedicated to Mei Ming.

== Reception ==
After its release, the Chinese government repudiated the documentary's claims, stating that Blewett fabricated them. A rebuttal to the documentary, The Dying Rooms: A Patchwork of Lies, was also produced. The documentary was also criticized by Irish charity Health Action Overseas. Two Irish aid coordinators for the charity traveled to China to visit the orphanages and reported that the claims in both The Dying Rooms and Return to the Dying Rooms were "wholly exaggerated and almost completely without substance".

In Patrick Tyler's review of Blewett's film, the New York Times stated that "Compelling images of neglect were captured on tape at this orphanage, and the rebuttal offered by the government did not succeed in addressing the poor condition of the infants found on the day of the film crew's visit." Walter Goodman also reviewed the film for the paper, stating that "Kate Blewett, Brian Woods, and Peter Hugh have not made a balanced or polished documentary. But more importantly, they have raised international concern over the fate of the children glimpsed here, some of whom have already joined countless others in unmarked graves."
