= Mogilino =

Mogilino Могилино
- Location within Bulgaria
- Coordinates: 43°26′N 25°58′E
- Elevation: 375 m (1,230 ft)

Population
  - Total: 362
- Time zone: UTC+2 (EET)
  - Summer (DST): UTC+3 (EEST)

Mogilino is a village in Ruse Province, northern Bulgaria. It became well known internationally after several reports about the institution for children with physical and mental disabilities. In 2007, the BBC aired the film "Bulgaria's Abandoned Children", created by documentarian Kate Blewett. The film critiqued the lack of activities, aid, and involvement offered to the disabled children.

Members of the British public started a petition to Prime Minister Tony Blair requesting intervention and pressure on EU institutions as well as for the Bulgarian government to solve the problem. Many British, Bulgarian and international charities intensified their work to help abandoned children in the country.

The case of Mogilino resembles the campaign publicising the conditions in the Romanian orphanages in the early 1990s. Bulgaria has been criticised for having one of the highest numbers of children in state institutional care in the EU.

On 30 January 2008 Bulgarian National Television aired a documentary made in response to Bulgaria's Abandoned Children called Dom (meaning house or home in Bulgarian). The filmmakers argued that "it is not right that the whole of Europe be antagonised against Bulgaria because of a well-manipulated and skillfully edited documentary on a home being prepared to close down, such as Mogilino,".

On the same day, Bulgarian Members of the European Parliament signed a declaration in which they called for "a common European policy on the upbringing and education of underprivileged children."

On 22 February 2008 Labour and Social Policy Minister Emilia Maslarova repeated a promise that the Mogilino home, along with six similar homes, would be closed.

At the initiative of Irish member of the European Parliament Kathy Sinnott, Kate Blewett's documentary was screened in the European Parliament on 4 March 2008.

On 27 June 2008 The Sofia Echo reported that some of the children from the Mogilino home had been relocated to other homes around Bulgaria, and that the Agency for Social Assistance and UNICEF were working, ultimately, to close the home.

The Mogilino Children's Institution finally closed on 1 October 2009, following further pressure from the BBC and the EU.
