= Madison Museum of Contemporary Art =

Art museum in Madison, Wisconsin

Coordinates: 43.07458°N 89.38914°W

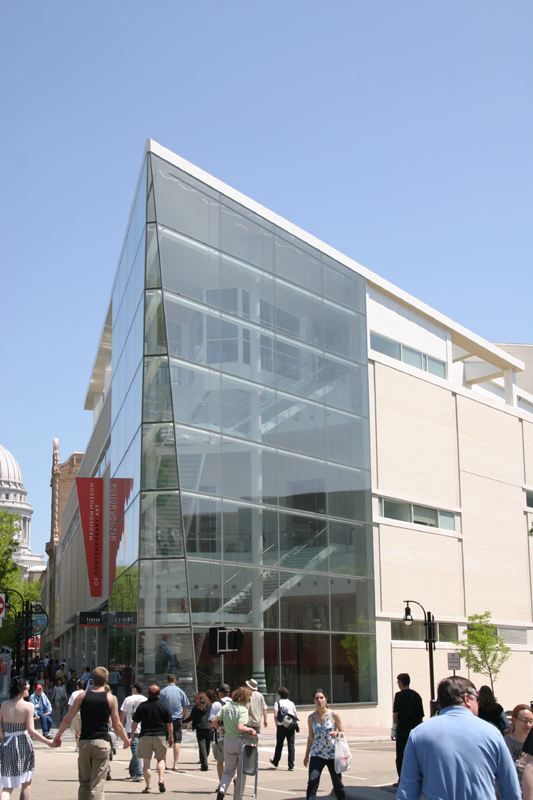
- MMoCA glass facade and Icon staircase on the corner of State St. and Henry St.
- Former name: Madison Art Center, Madison Art Association
- Established: 1901
- Location: 227 State Street; Madison, Wisconsin, US 53703
- Type: Art museum
- Director: Paul Baker Prindle
- Website: mmoca.org

The Madison Museum of Contemporary Art (MMoCA), formerly known as the Madison Art Center, is an independent, non-profit art museum located in downtown Madison, Wisconsin.

MMoCA is dedicated to exhibiting, collecting, and preserving modern and contemporary art. Its mission is to educate and inspire by means of rotating permanent collection exhibitions, special exhibitions, film series, and educational programming. The museum opened in its current home adjacent to the Overture Center for the Arts on April 23, 2006. Both MMoCA and the Overture Center were designed by architect César Pelli.

== History ==
MMoCA is one of Madison's oldest cultural organizations. Established as the Madison Art Association in 1901, the organization presented education programs and exhibitions in borrowed spaces. In 1964, the organization leased the former Lincoln School on Lake Mendota and merged with the Madison Art Foundation to become the Madison Art Center.

In 1980, the Madison Art Center moved into the Madison Civic Center. In 2003, the Art Center's name was changed to the Madison Museum of Contemporary Art (MMoCA) to more accurately reflect the museum's ongoing mission.

In 2019, the Madison Museum of Contemporary Art sparked controversy after posting a Call for Artists for an unpaid exhibition opportunity, which led to a response from the artist-led group Equity for Artists. The group criticized the museum for perpetuating systemic issues that hinder diversity in the art field, highlighting the $25 application fee, a $100 installation fee, and the requirement for artists to allow MMoCA free use of their artwork images in perpetuity. After an offsite discussion between artists, museum staff, and leadership, MMoCA revised the terms of the event, waiving the fees, offering installation support at no charge, and providing $100 honorariums to participating artists. The museum expressed regret, stating that it had not intended to place an undue burden on the artists.

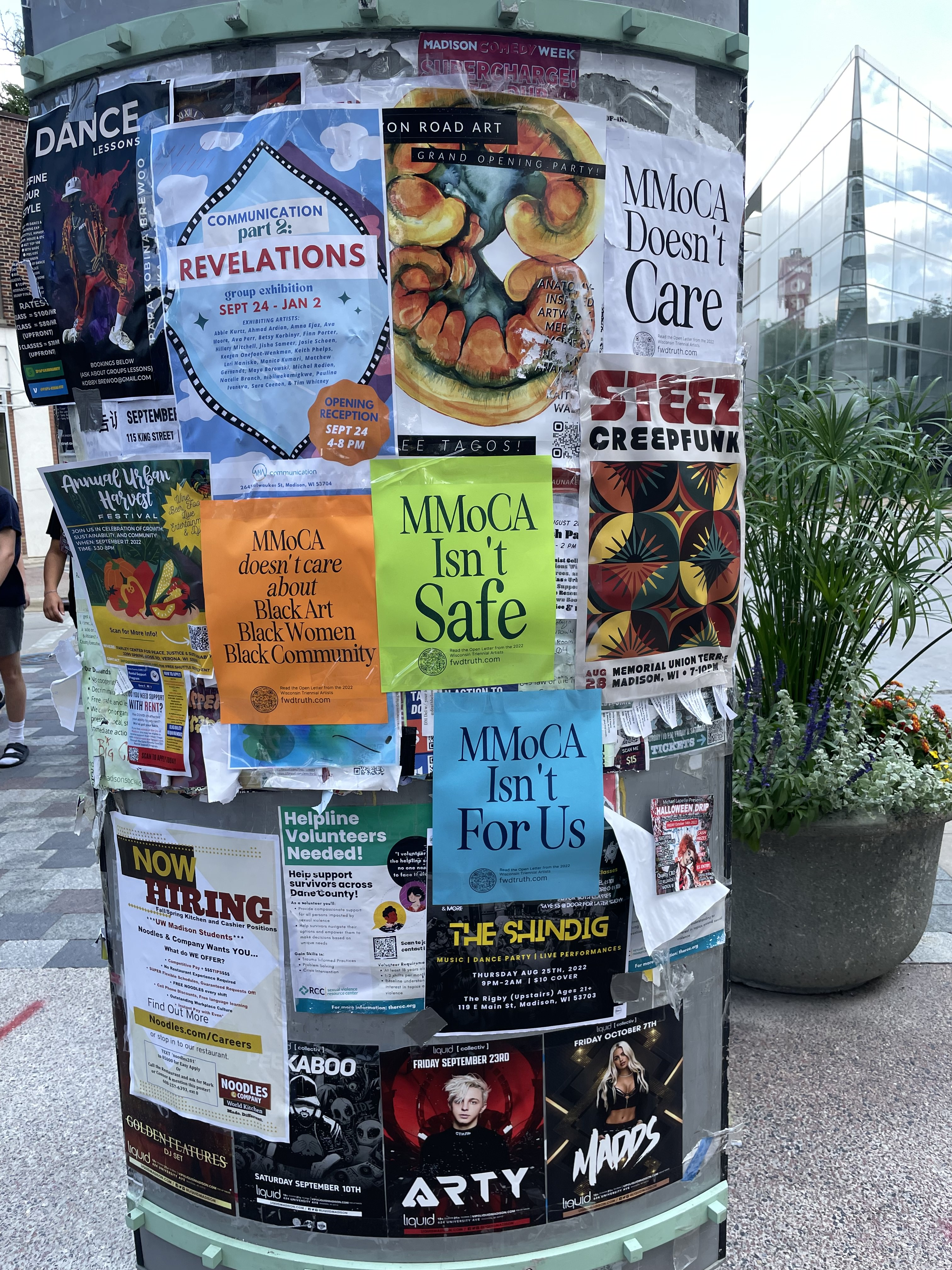
Community members' posters in front of MMoCA in August 2022; signs in support of the Triennial artist collective are hung.

The 2022 Wisconsin Triennial, titled "Ain't I A Woman?", focused on the work of Black or African American women, femmes, and gender nonconforming artists in Wisconsin faced controversy when a group of participating artists published an open letter protesting the museum's leadership, accusing them of mishandling incidents of harm, including the damage and removal of artist Lilada Gee's artwork by visitors. The artists criticized the museum for policy violations, unfair compensation, and a lack of support, leading over half of the artists to withdraw in protest. In response, MMoCA's executive committee denied accusations of institutional racism, defending their actions during the exhibition.

== Facilities ==
Made possible by the philanthropy of W. Jerome Frautschi and Pleasant T. Rowland, MMoCA encompasses 51,500 square feet of interior space, including highly flexible gallery spaces. MMoCA's primary art and gallery spaces are:

- The Henry Street Gallery (lower level)
- Lobby (first floor)
- The State Street Gallery (first floor)
- The Shop (first floor)
- The Main Galleries (second floor)
- The Imprint Gallery (second floor)
- Rooftop Sculpture Garden (rooftop/seasonal)

Also included are a 230-seat lecture hall, an education classroom, a study center for drawings, prints, and photographs. Fresco, the rooftop restaurant, closed in 2021.

== Collection and exhibitions ==
The permanent collection includes nearly 6,000 objects, comprising one of the nation's finest collections of Chicago Imagism as well as significant holdings in Mexican Modernist prints, Wisconsin-based artists, and contemporary photography. Depending on current exhibitions, a rotating selection of permanent collection work normally remains on view.

Of the more than 1,400 artists in MMoCA's permanent collection, included are Romare Bearden, Deborah Butterfield, Alexander Calder, Sonya Clark, Sam Gilliam, Guerrilla Girls, Frida Kahlo, Jin Soo Kim, Jacob Lawrence, Robert Mapplethorpe, Gladys Nilsson, José Clemente Orozco, Ed Paschke, Christina Ramberg, Cindy Sherman, Kiki Smith, Kara Walker, Andy Warhol, John Wilde, and Wesley Willis.

Exhibitions are the cornerstone of MMoCA's public programs and have featured many of the most respected artists of the last century, including Louise Bourgeois, Cecelia Condit, Tacita Dean, Jeffrey Gibson, Jasper Johns, Brad Kahlhamer, Alice Neel, Shirin Neshat, Rashaad Newsome, Georgia O'Keeffe, Claes Oldenburg, Nathaniel Mary Quinn, Robert Rauschenberg, Faith Ringgold, Peter Saul, George Segal, Alec Soth, Frank Stella, Do Ho Suh, and Ursula von Rydingsvard.

The Wisconsin Triennial is a major exhibition showcasing contemporary artists from Wisconsin. It began as a biennial event in 1978 at the Madison Art Center and transitioned to a triennial format in 1987.

The Main Galleries, located on the second floor, host the museum's major exhibitions. The Imprint Gallery, also on the second floor, is a small black box theater dedicated to time-based media, multimedia, and special installations. The State Street Gallery on the first floor offers a changing roster of special exhibitions and installations, while the Henry Street Gallery on the lower level presents selections and exhibitions from the museum's permanent collection. The Shop (as in, "workshop"), on the first floor, is dedicated to hosting interactive exhibitions and community events. MMoCA's Rooftop Sculpture Garden presents major 3D works and installations on a rotating basis in an illuminated, outdoor garden setting.

== Admission and funding ==
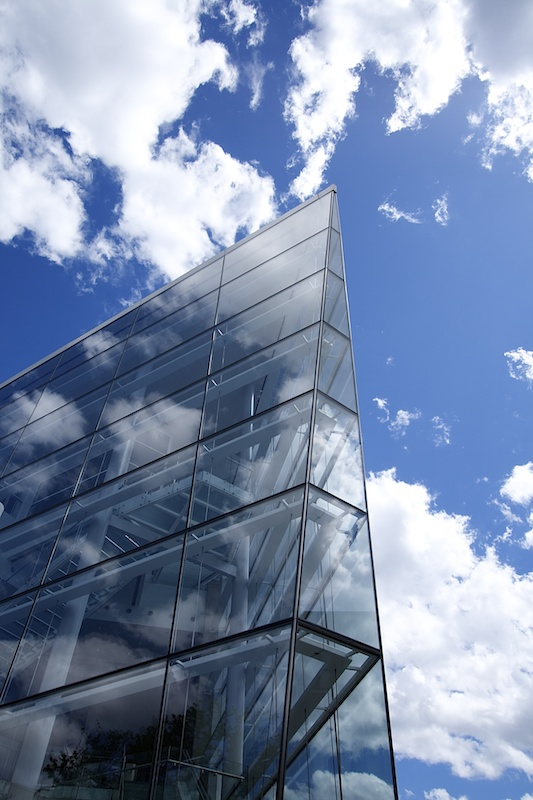
MMoCA glass facade and Icon staircase

MMoCA is free to the public.

As a free-admission museum, MMoCA relies on individuals, corporations, private event rentals, and foundations for necessary financial support. Key support is also provided by museum memberships, fundraising events like the annual Art Fair on the Square, and private gifts and donations.

== See also ==
- Overture Center for the Arts
- List of contemporary art museums
- List of museums in Wisconsin
