= Jin Soo Kim =

South Korean artist (born 1950)

- Born: 1950 (age 74–75); Seoul, South Korea
- Education: Art Institute of Chicago
- Known for: Installation art

- Jin Soo Kim
- Hangul: 김진수
- RR: Gim Jinsu
- MR: Kim Chinsu

Birth name
- Hangul: 정진수
- RR: Jeong Jinsu
- MR: Chŏng Chinsu

Jin Soo Kim is an installation artist who lives and works in Chicago, Illinois.

== Early life ==
Jin Soo Kim (born 1950) is a South Korean installation artist recognized for her work exploring immigrant cultural identity and labor. Kim's upbringing in post-war Korea and observation of traditional gender inequality motivated her to live a different life based on deep interests in arts since adolescence. In 1974, Kim received her B.S. from Seoul National University and left for Los Angeles, U.S. Having studied at Western Illinois University while working as a nurse, she earned an MFA in 1983 from the School of the Art Institute of Chicago, where she has been a professor of sculpture since 1990.

Though her art was not exhibited widely in the 1980s because it differed so widely from the popular styles, she began exhibiting at the Chicago Cultural Center and the Museum of Contemporary Art, Chicago. Kim then began to exhibit commercially. She focuses on installation art, whose freedom and ephemerality has engaged her. One of her best known works is Stratiformis, a piece of public art in Catalano Square, Milwaukee, completed in 1996. A large work that uses disassembled knitting machines, it signifies the local labor history of the area. She is also known for her Body and Shadow, which re-purposes machine made textiles into a work made by hand, representing the tension between pre-industrial Korean society and Western consumerism.

== Awards ==
Kim has received several fellowships, including Illinois Arts Council Fellowships and a National Endowment for the Arts Fellowship.

== Exhibitions ==
Kim has shown her work worldwide, including at the Chicago Cultural Center; Scottsdale Museum of Contemporary Art; Museum of Contemporary Art, Chicago; Brooklyn Museum; High Museum of Art, Atlanta; Gallery Hyundai, Seoul; Walker Art Center, Minneapolis; Madison Museum of Contemporary Art, Madison, WI; and the National Museum of Contemporary Art, South Korea.
