= Brad Kahlhamer =

American artist

Brad Kahlhamer (born in 1956) is an artist known for his multi-media practice, ranging from sculpture and painting to performance and music. Kahlhamer focuses on exploring his personal "third space", which is described as his meeting point of two opposing cultural personal histories. This is illustrated as his work navigates his stated Native American heritage, adoptive German-American family, and adult life in New York City’s Lower East Side. He is currently based in New York City, working from his studio in Brooklyn.

His work has been collected by institutions such as the Museum of Modern Art, the Whitney Museum of American Art, the Metropolitan Museum of Art, the Denver Art Museum, the Milwaukee Art Museum, and the Madison Museum of Contemporary Art, Seattle Art Museum, the Hood Museum of Art, and the San Francisco Museum of Modern Art among others.

== Career ==
Kahlhamer was born in Tucson, Arizona, United States. As an infant he was adopted by German-American parents and grew up in Wisconsin. Due to the fact his adoption records were sealed at the time of his birth, he does not know who he descends from and cannot be enrolled in any Native nations. His artistic career took form, first as a road musician throughout the Midwest for ten years and later in 1982 graduating with a BFA from the University of Wisconsin-Fond du Lac and Oshkosh and moving to New York City. The gritty vibrancy of the city, the Lower East Side and the Bowery further informed his iconography. Eventually spending ten years as a graphic artist and art director for Topps Chewing Gum Company before becoming a full-time artist in 1993.

Major influences that appear throughout his work are informed by a lifetime of multi-ethnic and street culture explorations. Exploring what he refers to as the “third place”— the meeting point of two opposing personal histories has been a primary concern throughout his artistic career. Overtime feeding a rich graphic vocabulary Kahlhamer explains, “Essentially, real events and people make up my characters. My work combines chronicle, myth, fantasy”. Most notably through Abstract Expressionism, graphic styles from Gary Panter, Art Spiegelman, Henry Darger, and continual study of Plains Indians' ledger drawings and a personal Native American heritage. His approach to painting identity is also discussed in his essay on the painter Fritz Scholder for the Denver Art Museum. Recently his work has been described by Holland Cotter as a “spin out references to contemporary Native American and post-punk urban culture in figures drawn in filament-fine-ballpoint lines, in graffiti-like phrases and in spray-painted stains that look like scorch marks.” Working in multiples, as he calls it, several series of paintings and sculptures have over time developed to be defining works.

Kahlhamer questions notions of authenticity and representation within a very specific discourse of Native American art. These matters become all the more complex and urgent in view of a concept of originality or of the primordial as established by many Native American people today. Adopting the position of delinquency within these fields of discourse is a simultaneously precarious act stepping into a realm of as the post-Smithsonian delinquent. Staging oneself as a vulnerable target – which also provides the potential for innovation, for a discursive handling of identity, cultural representation and reflection .

== Paintings and drawings ==
Loser+Clark, 1999, Oil on Canvas, 16x14 inches

Billy Jack Jr., 2006, graphite, ink, gouache, and watercolor on paper, 62x82 inches

In 2000, Brad Kahlhamer: Almost American, at the Madison Art Center (now Madison Museum of Contemporary Art) and the Aspen Art Museum, Laura Hoptman writes: “Kahlhamer’s graphic works seem to gather inspiration from the peculiar hybridity of the ledger drawings. In object as well as in practice, they present cross-cultural communication between aboriginal peoples and American newcomer on a number of levels, beginning with the very tools they used to make the drawings.” The “third place” to which Kahlhamer refers is explored through expressive painting and drawing that is a constant production of understanding personal histories. “The ‘middle place’ of Plains Indian ledger drawings is embodied at the most fundamental level in the manner in which Kahlhamer blends his fascination with Native American history and traditions, and his very real commitment to producing work reflective of the present time.”

=== Loser + Clark ===
The diffusion of expression of Kahlhamer’s icons and brushstroke is written about by Holland Cotter on Loser + Clark, (1999) in the New York Times, “ Paint goes on in brushy, sinewy networks against a white ground. (Mr. Kahlhamer's admiration for Abstract Expressionism is evident.) Scattered across the surface is a swirl of forms: animals, figures in canoes, wobbly Happy Faces, skyscraper-like stacks of music amplifiers, scrawled phrases, portraits and self-portraits, all floating through abstract landscapes of green hills and blue skies. The results have the ungrounded feel of Plains Indian ledger book drawings, with a charge of psychic irritation and urgency that those drawings keep suppressed.”

=== Eagle Fest USA ===
A prime example of Kahlhamer’s expression of the “third place” can be found in Eagle Fest USA, (2005) where large and aggressive line caricatures suggest icons of pop culture and the ultimate cycles of life and death. His imagery is expressed through dripping washes and thick line linear gestures of paint. Weaving references from American Indian history and culture into a large expressionist canvas.

=== Billy Jack Jr. ===
Depicting diversely coded references from popular culture Kahlhamer’s Billy Jack Jr. (2006), illustrates expressively painted figures, animals, and iconography of specific Indian tribes. The work refers to the 1971 cult film Billy Jack, a film that sheds light on the discrimination of Native Americans at the height of civil-rights movements across the United States. The story of Billy Jack, a hero of Native American and half-white heritage adds to the linear narrative that is painted.

== Sculpture ==
Within Kahlhamer’s world, he terms his sculptural figures “Spiritual Advisors”, that “sit sentry-like alongside his paintings and drawings”.

Bowery Nation, Mixed Media, 1985–2012

=== Bowery Nation ===
Richard Klein wrote, “Kahlhamer has spoken of Bowery Nation as an “alternative tribe” and the fact that the majority of the work's individual elements were born on New York's Lower East Side (the part of city with the most extensive history of immigration) makes a certain kind of sense” At first glance the installation is over 100-figures, small sculptures on top of a table, deriving from an earlier encounter with a vast collection of Hopi Kachina figures at the Heard Museum. Bowery Nation, (1985–2012) stands as a collective history of material and identity. Each figure created from found objects in an impulsive, spontaneous, and organic manner: “the sculptures were provisional and experimental, with no grand scheme or plan as to their eventual future. There was no attempt to actually replicate specific katsinas, with the nature of the sculptures more reflective of the artist’s hybrid artistic sensibility than Hopi belief or aesthetics”.

=== Super Catcher ===
Taking a new direction, Kahlhamer began a production of wire, bells, and dreamcatcher forms repeating and expanding by "using the ubiquitous symbol of the dream catcher, perhaps the most recognizable and appropriated object of American Indian culture, it hangs as an intricate, sprawling, sieve-like chain link net. He has explored this production through various works, mainly using materials such as wire, powwow bells, and jingles to achieve creating these unique dreamcatchers. Super Catcher, 2014 looms suspended from the ceiling as a swarm of elements in what Kahlhamer describes as “aftermarket spiritual rebar”. Most recently described as "dream catchers caught in an archaic fisherman’s net, studded with small bells" while on display at the San Francisco Museum of Modern Art.

== Music ==
An accomplished musician, he writes, performs and produces. Brad Kahlhamer's combines his experience in the music and art worlds and also has created videos that utilize his visual and audio work. In 2015 for The Huffington Post he says, "The sounds I play are like the forms in my work – skeletal, jangly, wiry”, this constant guerilla work with material translates through painting, sound, and writing.

The artist has also contributed album artwork for musical group Man Man.

== Previous exhibitions ==
1. The Plains Indians: Artists of Earth and Sky, The Metropolitan Museum of Art, NY
2. Bowery Nation, Nelson-Atikins Museum of Art, Kansas City, MO
3. One Must Know The Animals, Madison Museum of Contemporary Art, Madison, WI
4. Tale Spinning, Bates College Museum of Art, Lewiston, ME
5. Rapid City, Denver Museum of Contemporary Art, Denver, CO
6. The Old, Weird America: Folk Themes in Contemporary Art, Contemporary Arts Museum, Houston, TX
7. American Soil, Nerman Museum of Contemporary Art, Overland Park, KS
8. Radar, Denver Art Museum, Denver, CO
9. Picturing Change; the impact of Ledger Drawing on Native American Art, The Hood Museum of Art, Dartmouth College, NH
10. Supernova, San Francisco Museum of Modern Art, San Francisco, CA
11. Five Years of the Altoids Curiously Strong Collection 1998-2002, New Museum of Contemporary Art, New York, NY

== Awards ==
- Joan Mitchell Award
- Smithsonian Commission
