= Art Fair on the Square (Madison) =

Art event held in Wisconsin, USA

Coordinates: 43°4′28″N 89°23′5″W

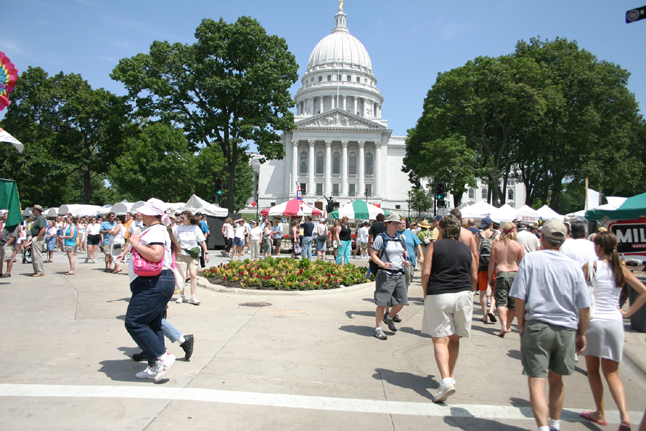
Art Fair on the Square, from State Street

Art Fair on the Square is an annual event held on the Capitol Square in Madison, Wisconsin, United States. The juried event brings together around 500 artists from across America on the second weekend of July. Most art forms are represented, including ceramics, glass, fibre arts, photography, graphic arts, sculpture, woodwork, metals and jewelry, as well as the traditional paint and print media. It has been one of the most popular events in Madison for 50 years, drawing an estimated 200,000 people each year, including artists, students, families and casual browsers. The event is organized by the Madison Museum of Contemporary Art (MMoCA) and serves as its primary fund-raising event. A virtual event was planned in 2020 with officials citing the COVID-19 pandemic as the cause.

As part of the art fair, the corners of the square and the middles of each side are lined with food vendors, music stages and other entertainment.

== Art Fair Off the Square ==
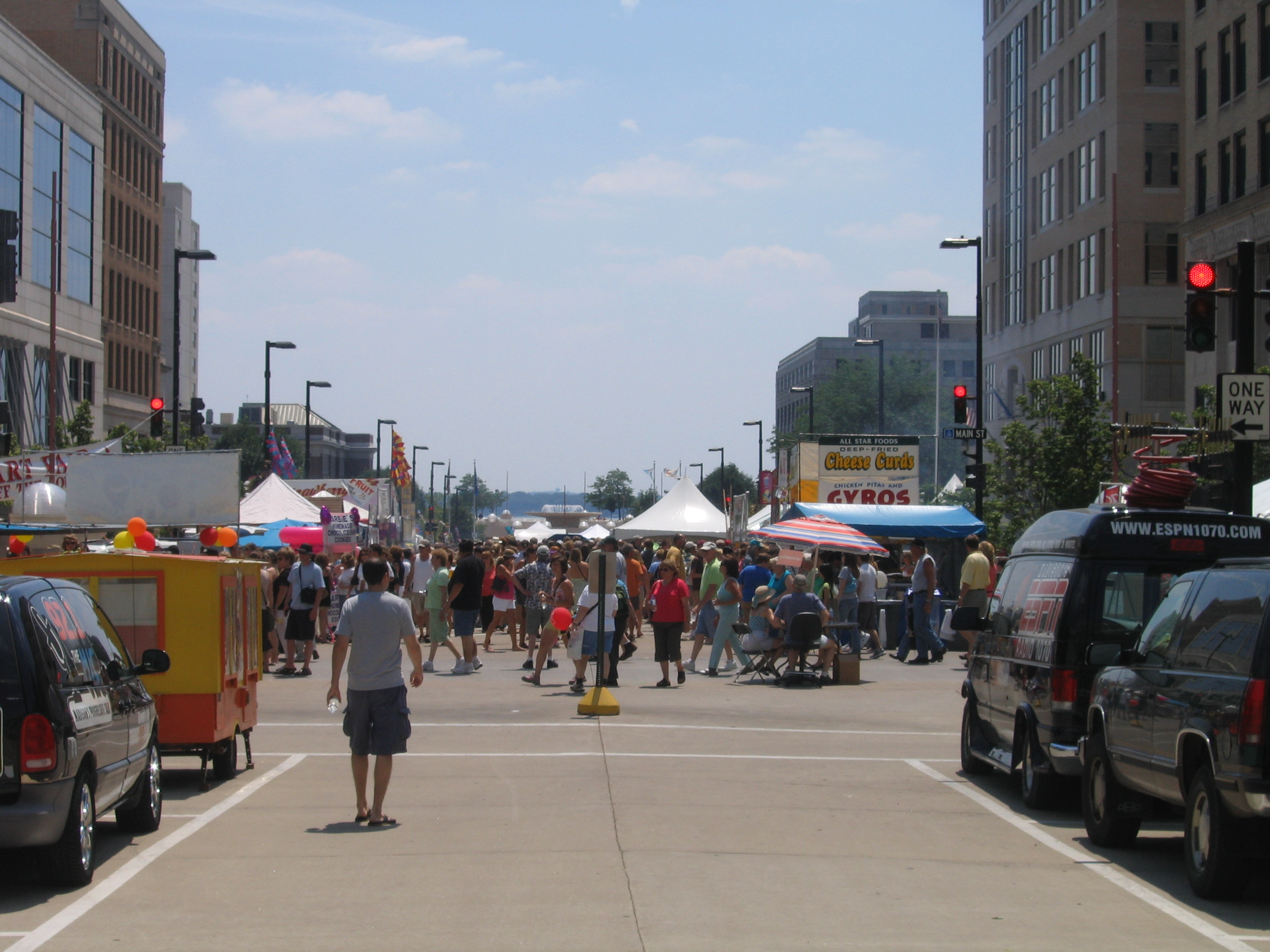
Art Fair Off the Square, along Martin Luther King, Jr. Blvd.

Held the same weekend as Art Fair on the Square is the Art Fair Off the Square, which is devoted exclusively to Wisconsin artists. Organized by the Wisconsin Alliance of Artists and Craftspeople, Art Fair Off the Square is held along Martin Luther King, Jr. Blvd., leading to the Monona Terrace.

== Additional attractions ==
In recent years, businesses and artists have set up along State Street leading to the University of Wisconsin campus.
