= The Three Amigos Campaign =

HIV prevention campaign

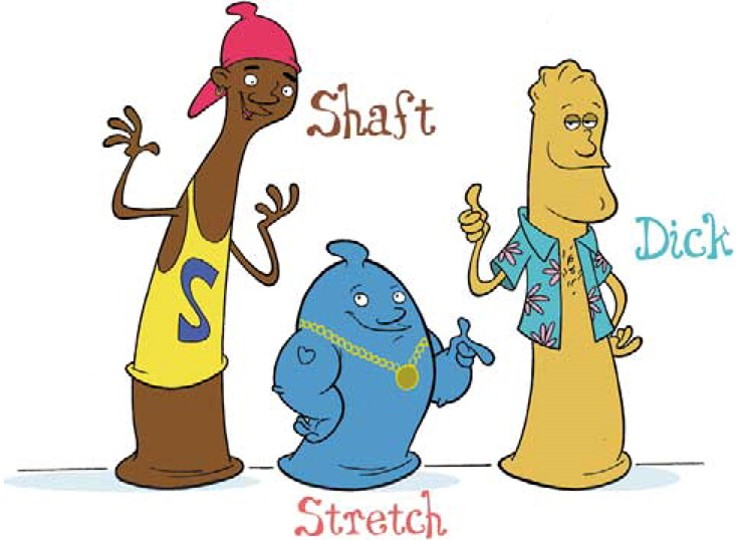
- Type of project: Public health campaign
- Country: Worldwide
- Key people: Firdaus Kharas, Brent Quinn
- Launched: 2005

The Three Amigos is a series of public service announcements whose primary focus was to create awareness on the prevention of HIV/AIDS transmission using humor. The series adapted a comical approach to convey the message in a manner that minimized the stigma assoiated with the virus infetion. This series featured 20 episodes with three animated characters in the shape of condoms and primarily targeted young individuals who were more prone to engage in risky sexual encounters.

This series was first screened at the XV International AIDS Conference in 2004 and later launched in 2005 officially. Produced by Firdaus Kharas and Brent Quinn, the campaign advocated for behaviour modification to communicate the importance of condom use as a safe sexual practice.

These animations were translated into various languages and spread through NGOs, educational institutions, hospitals, and various civic groups across different countries globally. All the episodes had humorous content with time duration of 15-60 seconds. The campaign relied on hand-drawn animation, created by volunteers from four countries and was freely distributed across various channels such as television broadcastings.

== Recognition ==
In 2006, this campaign received a Peabody Award for facilitating open discussion about the prevention of HIV/AIDS transmission. Several scholars have referenced the campaigns' animation-based strategy that conveyed the message without causing fear as conventional campaigns did. In 2003, the series was launched in South Africa and saw persons such as Archbishop Desmond Tutu support its humor based concept to stop the spread of HIV.
