= Real to Reel International Film Festival =

The Real to Reel International Film Festival is presented by the Cleveland County Arts Council and held annually in Kings Mountain, North Carolina, at the Joy Performance Center. It was founded in 2000 by Will Eskridge and Noel T. Manning II to offer a forum for independent film, video, and multi-media artists from around the world to showcase their talents and expose the works of these artists to our region.

The venue is the Joy Performance Center, located at 202 S. Railroad Ave., Kings Mountain, North Carolina, a renovated classic theater from the 1940s in Kings Mountain.

== Alumni ==
Real to Reel has a rich history of filmmaking alumni, including the following:

- In 2001, the award for Best Amateur Short Film (Under 18) went to “Mad Cell,” which was created by Matt Duffer, Ross Duffer, and Tristan Smith. Matt and Ross Duffer are twin brothers (commonly credited as the Duffer Brothers) from Durham, NC who are best known as the showrunners of Stranger Things, the wildly popular Emmy-winning Netflix series.
- In 2002, the award for Best Amateur Non-Feature (Under 18) went to Jeff Nichols for “Noble Chrome Pirates.” Nichols is a graduate of UNCSA and a multi-award-winning filmmaker whose features include “Take Shelter” (2011) with Michael Shannon and Jessica Chastain, “Mud” (2012) with Matthew McConaughey, and his latest drama “The Bikeriders,” starring Jodie Comer, Austin Butler, Michael Shannon, Tom Hardy, and others.
- In 2008, Real to Reel featured the narrative short film “Blood Over a Broken Pawn” which was written, directed, and produced by the late Chadwick Boseman. Boseman took the world by storm in his portrayal of the Black Panther in the Marvel Cinematic Universe, and was posthumously nominated for an Oscar for his performance in “Ma Rainey’s Black Bottom” (2020).
- In 2012, Bryce Dallas Howard won Best Director for the narrative short film “When You Find Me.” Howard is a Golden Globes and Critics Choice nominee with acting credits such as “The Help” (2011) and the “Jurassic World” franchise. She has also directed multiple episodes of the “Star Wars” series “The Mandalorian.”
- In 2014, Salisbury, NC native Will Merrick won the Best Short Film award in the Student/Amateur category. Merrick has had a successful career as an editor on feature films like the indie darling “Searching” (2018) and the Hulu original thriller film “Run” (2020). Merrick also co-directed the 2023 box office hit “Missing,” which premiered at the Sundance Film Festival and grossed $48 million at the worldwide box office against a production budget of $7 million.
- In 2016, the Best Professional Short award went to Mageina Tovah for “Hux.” Tovah has been acting in the industry for more than two decades, and is known for her fan-favorite role in the Sam Raimi “Spider-Man” series as Ursula, Peter Parker’s next-door neighbor.

== Annual Awards ==
The 25th Annual Real to Reel International Film Festival was held July 24– 27, 2024, featuring a total of 33 films from nine countries and four continents. Of the 33 films that were screened, 14 interactive filmmaker Q&A sessions were moderated by festival director Thomas Manning. This included an extended discussion with North Carolina–based hip-hop group Little Brother (rappers Phonte and Big Pooh), and filmmaker Holland Randolph Gallagher about their award-winning documentary "May the Lord Watch: The Little Brother Story."
