= Brian Woods (filmmaker) =

British documentary filmmaker

- Born: Brian Edwards; 16 March 1963 (age 63); Lytham St Annes, England, United Kingdom
- Education: Cambridge University
- Occupations: Filmmaker, producer
- Spouse(s): Deborah Shipley (1992 – died 2015); Dr Catherine Aiken (2017–present)

Brian Edwards (born 16 March 1963 in Lytham St Annes) is a BAFTA award-winning British documentary filmmaker, who founded and currently runs True Vision, an independent production company, which concentrates mainly on human rights-related subjects. Through the company he has been awarded or nominated for several international awards, including six US Emmies, a BAFTA, two US Peabodies, The Amnesty International Documentary Award, two One World Awards, and three Monte Carlo TV Festival Awards. The company's films have been commissioned by the BBC, Channel 4, Discovery and HBO, and have been shown around the world.

== Early life and career ==
Woods was educated at Cambridge University, where he read Natural Sciences at Fitzwilliam College.

== Awards ==
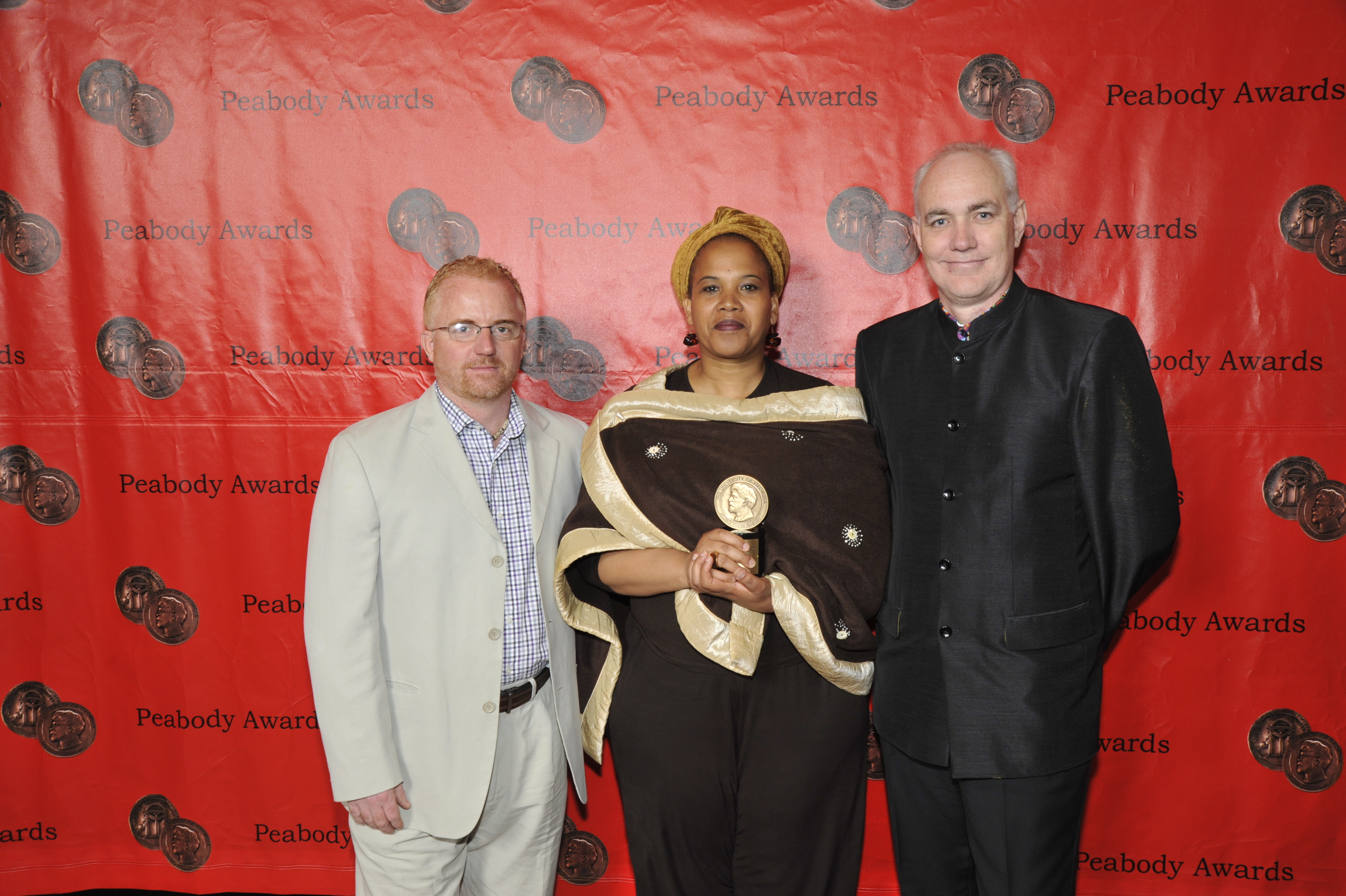
Jezza Neumann, Xoliswa Sithole and Brian Woods with award for Zimbabwe's Forgotten Children at the 70th Annual Peabody Awards

With Kate Blewett, Brian Woods received the Amnesty International UK Media Award in 2002 for photojournalism. Also with Blewett, he made a BBC documentary, Kids Behind Bars, shown on 17 April 2005, showing the situation of juvenile prisoners in different parts of the world and exploring the problems of juvenile crime and justice; they also co-produced The Dying Rooms.

== Other work ==
Woods is a founding trustee of the charity Care of China's Orphaned and Abandoned (COCOA) and a charitable theatre company. He is also a trustee of Sheffield DocFest and the Watersprite Film Festival.
