= Kate Blewett =

British documentary director

Kate Blewett is a documentary film-maker in the United Kingdom. She is best known for her documentaries on human rights abuses, such as The Dying Rooms and Bulgaria's Abandoned Children.

== Life ==
Kate Blewett grew up in Hong Kong, Malaysia and Thailand and enjoyed a prosperous family life. Her father was a British army General and a doctor. As a child she wanted to know why people had the lives they did and why they suffered. As a teenager she wanted to make documentaries. She has a first class degree from the Canterbury Christchurch University in Radio, Film and Television with Educational Broadcasting.

Blewett later returned to Hong Kong and specialized in Asian matters. She met her husband in Hong Kong and had her first child there. She returned to the UK after Hong Kong's return to China in 1997, but was soon working on The Dying Rooms.

== Work ==
Her first major job in filming was tourist promotion in remote areas of Indonesia. Blewett has filmed in Australia, China, Hong Kong, Japan, Korea, Macau, Malaysia, Micronesia, the Philippines, Singapore, Thailand and Taiwan. She has filmed a wide variety of subjects: art and education, businesses, crimes, cultures, corruption and death, the people, the politics, the religions, the stock exchanges, flotations, violence and wildlife.

She worked for two years developing The Dying Rooms, a documentary about orphanages in communist China. The documentary was made with Brian Woods and Peter Woolrich. All three pretended to work in the orphanages. She found evidence that very young children were deliberately neglected and allowed to die in agonizing ways and became so distressed that she wanted to leave China, but she nevertheless continued the investigation. The Dying Rooms was televised in 26 nations and prompted an enormous outcry. She is trustee of Care of China's Orphaned and Abandoned, a charitable organization which was established after the documentary was screened.

Blewett has also worked with Brian Woods to expose forced labour in cocoa production. (See Chocolate and slavery.)

She is author of the documentary Bulgaria's Abandoned Children about a special care home for children in Mogilino. The film was criticised in Bulgaria for severe errors in translation, suggesting bias.

== Awards ==
- 2002, with Brian Woods, won the Amnesty International Media Award for the television documentary "Kids behind bars", (True Vision Productions, BBC – produced by Kate Blewett and Brian Woods)
