= Spy Hop =

- Formation: 1999; 27 years ago
- Founder: Rick Wray and Erik Dodd
- Type: After-school, youth media non-profit
- Purpose: To provide opportunities for young people to get involved in the digital media arts and learn skills needed to begin working towards careers in the digital arts
- Location: Salt Lake City, Utah

Spy Hop is an after-school, youth media non-profit in Salt Lake City, Utah. It aims to provide opportunities for young people to get involved in the digital media arts and learn skills needed to begin working towards careers in the digital arts. It was founded in 1999 by Rick Wray and Erik Dodd as an after school film class and has grown over the years to include game design, documentary, music and audio production.

Spy Hop has been twice recognized by the White House as a leading arts and humanities organization. Spy Hop was profiled as one of the eight outstanding non-profit arts programs in the nation in a two-year research report commissioned by the Wallace Foundation titled Something to Say. Vinny Cavalcanti and Nick Miller from Spy Hop's year-long after school music program won first place in the 2013 Grammy Foundation's "Teens! Make Music Contest" for their work highlighting the dangers of drug and alcohol use. On December 29, 2013, Dixon Lee, a long term student of Spy Hop, received one of the nation's 34 Marshall Scholarships to study in the UK.

On November 17, 2015, Kitzia Rodriguez and Kasandra VerBrugghen accepted an award presented by first lady Michelle Obama as one of the nations 12 best after-school mentoring programs. The award honors the nation's best after-school programs and Spy Hop Productions was chosen by the National Arts and Humanities Youth Program Awards from a pool of 285 nominees.

On June 15, 2021, Spy Hop was granted $3 million by philanthropist Mackenzie Scott, former wife of Amazon founder Jeff Bezos. This is the largest single donation Spy Hop has ever received.
