= John Merrow =

American broadcast journalist (born 1941)

- Born: John G. G. Merrow II; June 14, 1941 (age 84); Summit, New Jersey, US
- Education: AB, Dartmouth College, 1964; MA, Indiana University Bloomington, 1968; EdD, Harvard Graduate School of Education, 1973
- Occupations: Journalist, news anchor, author
- Notable credit: The NewsHour with Jim Lehrer
- Spouse: Joan Lonergan ()

John G. Merrow II (born June 14, 1941) is an American retired broadcast journalist who reported on education issues starting in the 1970s. He was the education correspondent for the PBS NewsHour program. These features - often under the umbrella heading of "The Merrow Report" - were a staple of education reporting on public broadcasting. Additionally, he was the executive producer, host and president of Learning Matters, Inc., a not-for-profit corporation that creates television, radio and online segments and documentaries, focusing primarily on education.

== Life ==
Merrow earned an A.B. from Dartmouth College in 1964, and received an M.A. degree in American Studies from Indiana University Bloomington in 1968. In 1973, Merrow graduated from the Harvard Graduate School of Education, with a doctorate in Education and Social Policy. He began his career as an education reporter in 1974, when National Public Radio began airing his first investigative reports on the nation's schools. Merrow quickly developed a devoted following with his program "Options In Education," which aired for eight years. The weekly radio broadcast received the prestigious George Polk Award in 1981.

Merrow later produced a seven-part television series for PBS along the same lines, entitled "Your Children, Our Children." This program received an Emmy nomination in 1984. He also served as education correspondent for the MacNeil/Lehrer Newshour for five years (1985–1990), and briefly occupied a similar position with The Learning Channel before returning to the PBS program in 1993.

In 1995, Merrow established Learning Matters, which produced his NewsHour reports, along with other media content. In 1998, he created Listen Up! - a project which trains disadvantaged youth and their teachers in broadcast production skills and techniques. He received the George Foster Peabody Award in 2001 for "School Sleuth: The Case of an Excellent School," and won a second Peabody Award for Listen Up's production, "Beyond Borders," in 2006. In 2005 and 2007, Learning Matters' programming received Emmy nominations. In 2012, Merrow was honored with the prestigious Harold W. McGraw, Jr. Prize in Education. Merrow retired in 2015 and Learning Matters was acquired by Education Week.

Merrow is also a published book author: he wrote "Choosing Excellence" (2001), "Below C Level" (2010), and "The Influence of Teachers" (2011). and "Addicted to Reform: A 12-Step Program to Rescue Public Education" (The New Press, 2017). He also co-edited, with Richard Hersh, "Declining by Degrees" (2005).

Merrow's Blog, The Merrow Report, can be found at Themerrowreport.com and on Substack.

He retired from the PBS NewsHour in 2015.

== Works ==
- Choosing Excellence Lanham, Md.: Scarecrow Press, 2001, ISBN 9781578860142, OCLC 45207840
- Below C Level (2010)
- The Influence of Teachers (2011).
- John Merrow, Richard Hersh, (eds) Declining by Degrees PBS Home Video, (2005) OCLC 61207761

“Addicted to Reform: A 12-Step Program to Rescue Public Education” (The New Press, 2017)
