= Integrational linguistics =

Theory of language

Integrational Linguistics (IL) is a general approach to linguistics that has been developed by the German linguist Hans-Heinrich Lieb and others since the late 1960s. The term "Integrational Linguistics" as a name for this approach has been used in publications since 1977 and antedates the use of the same term for integrationism, an unrelated approach developed by Roy Harris. Integrational Linguistics continues being developed by an open group of linguists from various countries.

== Overview ==
Over the past decades, IL has developed two major linguistic theories: (i) a general theory of language (the integrational theory of language) that covers both the systematic features of language systems and the phenomenon of language variability in a unified way, and (ii) a theory of grammars (the integrational theory of grammars), understood as part of a theory of linguistic descriptions. The separation of a theory of language from a theory of grammars is a major feature of IL by which it differs from approaches with a generative orientation. After an initial emphasis on the integrational theory of grammars till the mid-1970s, work in IL has been characterized by a steady and continuous refinement of the integrational theory of language based on empirical data from typologically diverse languages, avoiding basic revisions as they occurred in Chomskyan generative grammar.

The most comprehensive presentation of IL to date is Lieb (1983). This book contains both a theory of grammars and a general theory of language comprising a general morphology, morphosemantics, lexical semantics, syntax, and sentential semantics; a general phonology has been added by Lieb (1998, 1999, 2008). A shorter overview of the theory of language developed in IL may be found in Lieb (1992); for its syntactic part see, in particular, Lieb (1993). The general orientation of Integrational Linguistics places this approach within a 'New Structuralism' that combines careful attention to methodological soundness, emphasis on actual language description, and a cognitive outlook that leaves language structure outside the mind (Lieb 1992); at the same time, IL is closest among modern approaches to Western grammatical tradition.

Integrational Linguistics has its own multilingual website, The Homepage of Integrational Linguistics, which contains, among other resources, a comprehensive Bibliography of Integrational Linguistics as well as information about linguists currently working within this approach.

== Main features ==
IL is not a theory but an approach within general linguistics, i.e. the branch of linguistics which studies all languages and aims at developing a general theory of language.

Accordingly, IL has developed a comprehensive theoretical framework for the description of arbitrary languages. From its inception, this framework has been a non-generative and non-transformational, but rather declarative formal framework for studying all aspects of language and languages. IL provides an axiomatically formulated theory of language, which currently covers, in particular, phonology, morphology, syntax, semantics, and language variability.

IL is a non-generative and non-transformational approach in linguistics: it assumes neither "deep structures" nor transformational relations between sequentially ordered structures. Rather, IL conceives linguistic entities as interrelated, "multidimensional" objects, which are typically modelled as set-theoretic constructs.

IL is opposed to basic assumptions that characterize linguistic cognitivism in its 'non-intentionalist' varieties: the objects of linguistics are construed not as mental or neurophysiological mechanisms or corresponding 'representations,' but as natural languages conceived as abstract, extramental entities; a grammar of a language is an empirical theory (ideally, an empirical axiomatic theory) of that language, in a sense of 'theory' that requires sets of statements among the theory's components Hence, the traditional generative as well as the more recent cognitive conceptions of grammars as algorithms are rejected: from the very beginning, grammars were construed in IL not as algorithms but as 'declarative' theories (theories that make claims formulated as statements, and carefully keep apart a description from the entities described), a position that is currently being seriously considered also in other approaches. Natural languages are seen to arise from abstract, extramental objects (such as phonetic sounds). However, these objects are associated with concrete physical events (such as utterances of phonetic sound sequences) and are involved in the content of mental states or events that are connected with language use and knowledge. IL is thus compatible with a non-cognitivist, 'intentionalist' mentalism that may be proposed as typical of a 'New Structuralism' (Lieb 1992a, 1992b).

Given these characteristics, the common but rather constrained distinction between 'formalist,' 'functionalist,' and 'cognitivist' schools of linguistics does not apply to IL, which exhibits features of all three kinds of approaches. Major advantages of IL may be seen in (i) the fact that it was developed in view of the full spectrum of linguistic diversity from the outset, (ii) its integration of all levels of linguistic description (from phonetics to sentence semantics) within a unified theoretical framework, (iii) its inclusion of both system-based and non-system-based properties of languages, (iv) its development both of a theory of language and a theory of linguistic descriptions, and (v) the ontological explicitness and consistency of all its theories, making it a framework suitable for the description of individual languages as well as for contrastive linguistics, linguistic typology and universals research.

IL adopts a positive and constructive attitude toward Western linguistic tradition and regards itself as a part of this tradition. In syntax and morphology, the Integrational Theory of Language centers around a formally explicit, consistent, and vastly enriched version of theoretical conceptions underlying actual grammar writing since antiquity, embedding them in a broader scientific context that comprises linguistics and its neighboring disciplines; and the Integrational Theory of Grammars applies modern means to account for the intricacies of actual descriptive work.

Integrational Linguistics strives for logical soundness even in informal descriptions and makes extensive use of naive set theory in formulating its theories in order to achieve explicitness and clarity.

== Motivation for the name "integrational linguistics" ==
The term 'integrational' is motivated by the following 'integrative' features of the approach as a whole:

1. Linguistics is construed as a well-defined discipline in its own right but is also placed within a wider system of interrelated disciplines. Contrary to the conceptions proposed by Noam Chomsky, which reduced linguistics first to psychology and later to biology, IL adopts a non-reductionist stance: such disciplines as biology, psychology, sociology, and anthropology are conceived as neighboring disciplines of linguistics, disciplines that each share a branch with linguistics (biolinguistics, psycholinguistics, sociolinguistics, etc.); and linguistics itself is construed as a branch of (human) semiotics.
2. A broad view of linguistic subject matter is taken: linguistics deals with all aspects of natural languages that are directly or indirectly relevant to their use. This includes not only systematic aspects of languages, i.e., aspects related to structural properties of 'linguistic systems' in a traditional sense, but also the internal variability of languages; the relationship between languages and the structure of the societies in which they are used; the relationship between communication in a language and actions by, or psychological processes in, a speaker; the neurophysiological and psychological foundations for learning and mastering a language; and aspects of the development and decline of languages.
3. It is assumed that each major aspect of natural languages (the morphological, the syntactic, the semantic, etc.) must be characterized in its own right, which includes showing its interrelations with other aspects. This is achieved in IL by developing separate but interrelated theories for each major aspect (Integrational Morphology, Integrational Syntax, etc.) that form coherent parts of a larger 'Integrational Theory of Language Systems' (see below).
4. A non-linguistic theory (e.g., a psychological or sociological theory) may be integrated with a theory of language, and relevant parts of a general theory of language are, as a rule, integrated with each language description (itself a theory of one or more individual languages or language varieties): the language description is formulated 'in terms of' a theory of language, that is, it incorporates and employs terms, definitions, assumptions, and theorems from the underlying general theory. This idea of 'theory integration' is made precise in the Integrational Theory of Grammars.

== History ==
Integrational Linguistics is an approach to linguistics that has arisen mainly from work done by Hans-Heinrich Lieb since roughly 1965. From its inception, Integrational Linguistics has been non-generative.

Lieb's early work, culminating in Lieb (1970), was directed towards that part of a theory of language that deals with language-internal variability, especially with variability in time. As such, it was opposed to the general orientation of linguistics in the sixties and early seventies where language variability was programmatically disregarded. The integrational treatment of language variability has later been continued, and to some extent completed, in Lieb (1993).

The 1970 framework for language variability did not include a theory of language systems. In 1972, Lieb began work on a general syntax as part of a theory of language systems. At the same time he was also working on a theory of grammars conceived as part of a theory of linguistic description not of a theory of language. In the Integrational Theory of Grammars, the traditional modern conception of grammars as algorithms was rejected in favour of a conception that has later become known as 'declarative grammar'. The integrational format of grammars construed as empirical axiomatic theories (Lieb 1974, 1976) is also characterized in Lieb (1983: Part G), and more briefly in Lieb (1989).

In 1972 Lieb founded a research group at the Freie Universität Berlin for further developing a general syntax as part of a theory of language. Under his direction, the group did work both on a general syntax and on the syntax of German from 1972 to 1982. Since 1992 there has again been a regular research colloquium at the Freie Universität Berlin working on problems of Integrational Linguistics.

Differently from other approaches, there have been no abrupt changes of direction in Integrational Linguistics. By now the theory of language developed in Integrational Linguistics has grown into an in-depth theory of all major aspects of language, and its application to a number of different and unrelated languages of the world is in progress.

So far, the following languages have been or are being studied from an integrational point of view: German, English, Latin, French, Russian, Polish, Chinese, Burmese, Yinchia, Guaraní, Aweti.
