= William Conger =

American painter (born 1937)

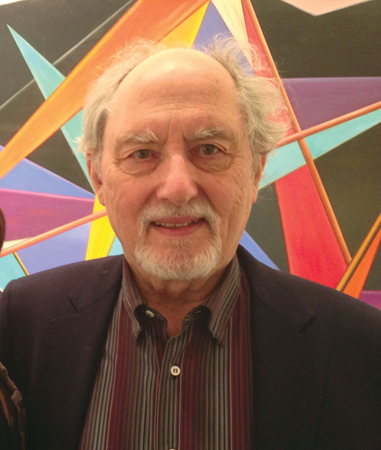
- William Conger, in 2016.
- Born: 1937 (age 88–89); Dixon, Illinois, US
- Education: University of New Mexico, University of Chicago, School of the Art Institute of Chicago
- Known for: Painting
- Style: Allusive Abstraction
- Website: William Conger

William Conger (born 1937) is a Chicago-based, American painter and educator, known for a dynamic, subjective style of abstraction descended from Kandinsky, which consciously employs illogical, illusionistic space and light and ambiguous forms that evoke metaphorical associations. He is a member of the "Allusive Abstractionists," an informal group of Chicago painters self-named in 1981, whose paradoxical styles countered the reductive minimalism that dominated post-1960s art. In 1982, critic Mary Mathews Gedo hailed them as "prescient prophets of the new style of abstraction" that flowered in the 1980s. In his essay for Conger's fifty-year career retrospective, Donald Kuspit called Conger art-historically daring for forging a path of subjective abstraction after minimalism had allegedly purged painting of an inner life. Despite being abstract, his work has a strong connection to Chicago's urban, lakeside geography and displays idiosyncratic variations of tendencies identified with Chicago Imagist art. A hallmark of Conger's career has been his enduring capacity for improvisation and discovery within self-prescribed stylistic limits.

Conger has shown at the Art Institute of Chicago, Museum of Contemporary Art, Chicago (MCA), the Krannert Art Museum, and Jonson Museum, and in numerous solo exhibitions in Chicago and beyond. His work has been discussed in national publications such as Artforum, Art in America, Arts Magazine, and ARTnews, and major dailies including the Chicago Tribune and Los Angeles Times. He has been recognized by the Pollock-Krasner Foundation, City of Chicago Public Commissions, inclusion in the Smithsonian Archives of American Art, and purchases by public and private collections. In addition to his art career, Conger has taught and chaired art departments at DePaul University and Northwestern University, and written about art.

== Life and career ==
William Conger was born in Dixon, Illinois and raised in Evanston and Chicago's Lincoln Park neighborhood. He was exposed to art early in life, including trips with his mother, an amateur painter, to the Art Institute of Chicago (AIC) and studies at its junior school. After an erratic high school career, he enrolled there in 1954, but transferred to the University of New Mexico (UNM) in 1957, to set out on his own.

At UNM, Conger studied under Raymond Jonson—founder of the Transcendental Painting Group—Elaine de Kooning, and sculptor Robert Mallary. Jonson and de Kooning were key influences, as were the romantic southwestern landscape and imagery, including Native American pottery. After earning a BFA in 1960, Conger returned to Chicago, painted in a shared studio with artist Robert Lewis, and found advertising work with Montgomery Ward and Skil Power Tools. He soon met his future wife, Kathleen—they married in 1964—and returned to school to pursue art full time, choosing the University of Chicago. He studied with professor Seymour Rosofsky, returned to figurative work for a time, and earned an MFA in 1966.

After graduating, Conger began a distinguished education career, initially at Rock Valley College in Rockford, Illinois, and later as professor and chair of art departments at DePaul University and Northwestern University. He exhibited steadily in the Midwest and in solo shows at the Douglas Kenyon (1974–6), Zaks (1978–1983), and Roy Boyd (1985–2012) galleries in Chicago. He has since been represented by Zolla/Lieberman (Chicago) and Bruno David (St. Louis). Key shows he was in include: AIC's "Chicago and Vicinity" surveys (several, 1963–1985), the MCA's "Abstract Art in Chicago" (1976) and "Art in Chicago 1945-95" (1996–7), "Chicago, Some Other Traditions" (traveling, 1983–6), and "The Chicago Connection" (traveling, 1976–7). Conger continues to work and live in Chicago, with his wife Kathleen. They have two daughters, Sarah and Clarisa, and five grandchildren.

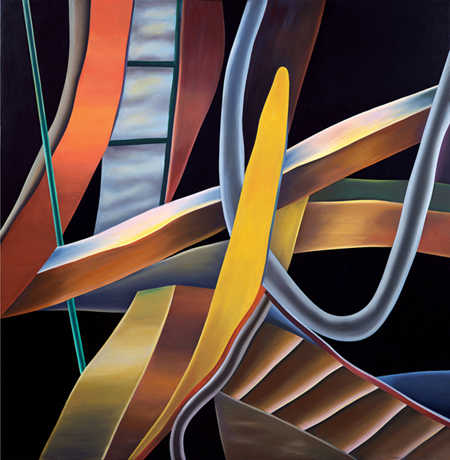
William Conger, Flossy's Night, oil on canvas, 63" x 63", 1972

== "Allusive Abstraction" ==
Conger's work is rooted in the figural abstraction of artists like Kandinsky, Klee, Miró, and pre-war Americans Jonson and Arthur Dove. Features that unite him to this more solitary, symbolic tradition are his illusionistic space, mix of organic and geometric forms, and openness to reference beyond the canvas. John Brunetti wrote that Conger's fluid, "muscular language" refined the formal grammars of Cubism and Surrealism to incorporate intuitive expression of feelings, memories and engagement, often informed by his native Chicago. As early as 1976, Conger labeled his paintings "metaphors of experience and feeling... the mind as nature."

Critic Saul Ostrow described Conger's method as "fluctuating between the rational, the associative, and the subjective." Although non-representational, his work connects to the everyday world through signifiers and titles he lets emerge during the painting process, which evoke what he calls "'as if' places and stories" without depicting any specific one. He does so based on his contention that abstract work can never be completely non-referential—that intentionally or not, all art generates meaning beyond itself. For Donald Kuspit, the process yields an aesthetically resonant, "spontaneous means of introspection, even self-analysis" that invites psychological unpacking.

In Chicago, however, all of this placed Conger on the "wrong" side of two largely critic-fueled battles. First, local identification with the increasingly famous, representational Chicago Imagists often relegated abstract work to comparative obscurity. Secondly, minimalism—represented by the ideas of Clement Greenberg and work of Frank Stella—dominated post-1960s abstraction. Characterized by formal regularity, geometricity, flat space and non-referentiality, minimalism had, in Kuspit's words, purged the subjective roots of abstraction and reduced it "to an emotional vacuum uninhabited by any self."

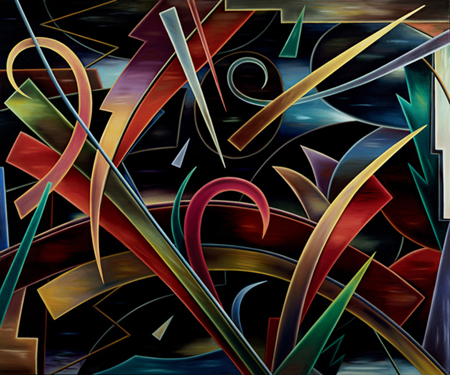
William Conger, South Beach, oil on canvas, 60" x 72", 1985

Conger resisted. Although an abstractionist, he felt a personal kinship with the Imagists, and little affinity for the limiting strictures of Greenbergian minimalism. His blend of ambiguous forms and atmosphere, oblique referentiality, and metaphorical allusions to art, history and geography occupied a unique place where abstraction and representation coalesced, bridging the groups. With like-minded, but visually diverse Chicago painters Miyoko Ito, Richard Loving and Frank Piatek, Conger formed the informal "Allusive Abstractionists" in 1981, to spark dialogue and make space for a wider conception of abstraction. Critics have identified elements in their art—idiosyncratic "languages," graduated light, organic forms, contradictory space and meticulously crafted surfaces—relating them to the Imagists, formally, if not in tone.

== Work ==
In his early career, Conger painted in a style reminiscent of Hans Hoffmann that, by 1970, gave way to work featuring hard-edged, modulated shapes set in complex juxtapositions against light grounds. According to Mary Mathews Gedo, with Flossy's Night (1972), Conger's mature style began to emerge with more organic ribbon-like forms in luminous jewel tones edged in light and set against a deep red-black ground. Also fully developed were his Immaculate, beautifully glazed surfaces and his "metaphysical," neon-like illumination which, lacking a visible source or cast shadows, created a surreal quality. Critics like Artforum's C. L. Morrison soon noted Conger's growing assurance with color and composition, and an architectural turn employing frame-like apertures to contain his fractured, lively forms in a state of stained-glass-window equilibrium.

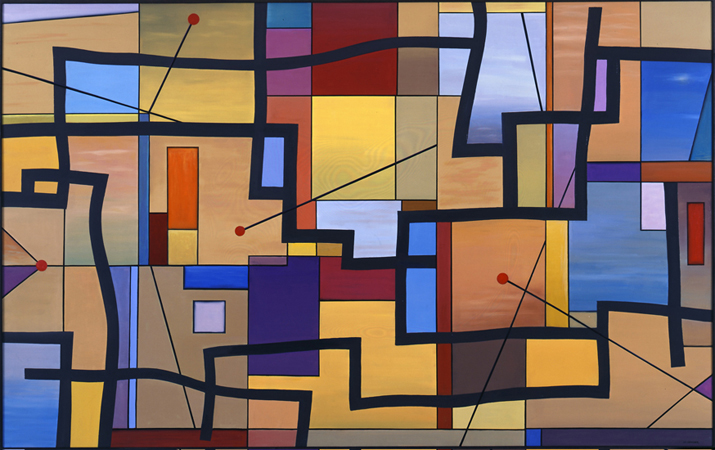
William Conger, City on the Make, oil on canvas, 60" x 96", 2001

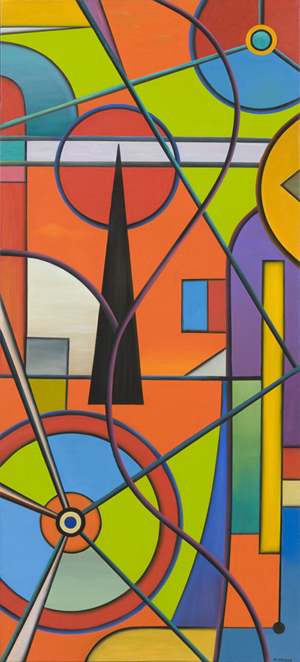
William Conger, Trolley, oil on canvas, 66" x 30", 2007

Conger's work of the 1980s more overtly referenced the natural and urban worlds. Passages of brushwork and modeling suggested lake, sky, and horizons behind quasi-floral forms that clashed and overlapped in illusionistic space. He explained, "My aim was to suggest a furious condition of nature, something swift, terrifying, and yet beautiful." In works like the large-scale Broadway—referring not to Manhattan, but to the bustling Chicago thoroughfare Conger grew up near—or South Beach (both 1985), he evoked, in his words, "Chicago's jazzy materialism, sensuality, and tension." In the 1990s, Conger pushed naturalistic and geometric elements—like modeled asteroid-like shapes or inexplicable rectangles, circles and orbs—further to create otherworldly, sometimes metallic-colored landscapes glimpsed in fragments between shapes.

With his "Circus" (1997–8), "Childhood" (2000), and "Iron Heart City" (2002) series came a new dynamism, a formal playfulness, and a lighter mood. He captured the vitality, visual clutter and shifting emotional flux of spectacle, schoolyard and early city in exuberantly colored paintings like City on the Make (2001) or Trolley (2007), whose puzzle-like compositions of geometric and sinuous shapes, are enlivened and held together by bold, undulating lines. Critics, and Conger, likened these works to a circus act, juggling unresolved tensions between flat and illusory space, compositional thrust and counter-thrust, and off-key color relationships that ARTnews said came together with an "uncanny sense of balance."

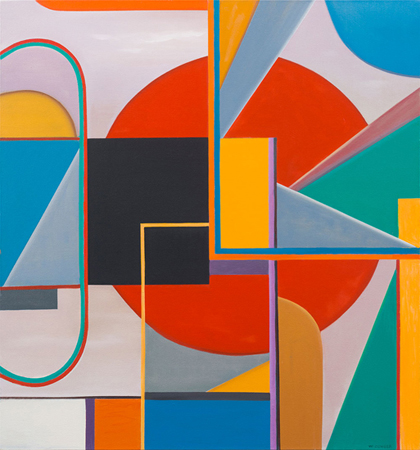
William Conger, Say When, oil on canvas, 30" x 28", 2017

Intermittently, throughout his career, Conger has made and exhibited small paper and wood collages and gouache paintings. In 2010, he began showing very small gouache paintings—looser, immediate works that feature vital, cross-hatched strokes and serve as a form of experimentation. These works, and later paintings like Say When (2017), display a shift toward slightly shallower space and more geometric forms.

== Writing ==
Conger has written about abstract painting, drawing, art theory, education, and the work of Delacroix, Manet, Monet, and Louise Nevelson. He has contributed to publications including Critical Inquiry, Whitewalls, Dialogue, Pulse, The Analytic Press, Neoteric Art, and Chicago/Art/Write, as well as to the books Looking at Art from the Inside Out by Mary Mathews Gedo (1994) and What Do Artists Know by James Elkins (2013).

His essay in Linguistic Sciences, "Abstract Painting and Integrationist Linguistics" (2011), proposed the idea that visual form and language are inherently interdependent and have been artificially and wrongly separated by art practice and discourse. He applies linguist Roy Harris's integrationism to abstract art, noting his inclusion of (extra-linguistic) biomechanical, macrosocial and circumstantial features in the communication process.

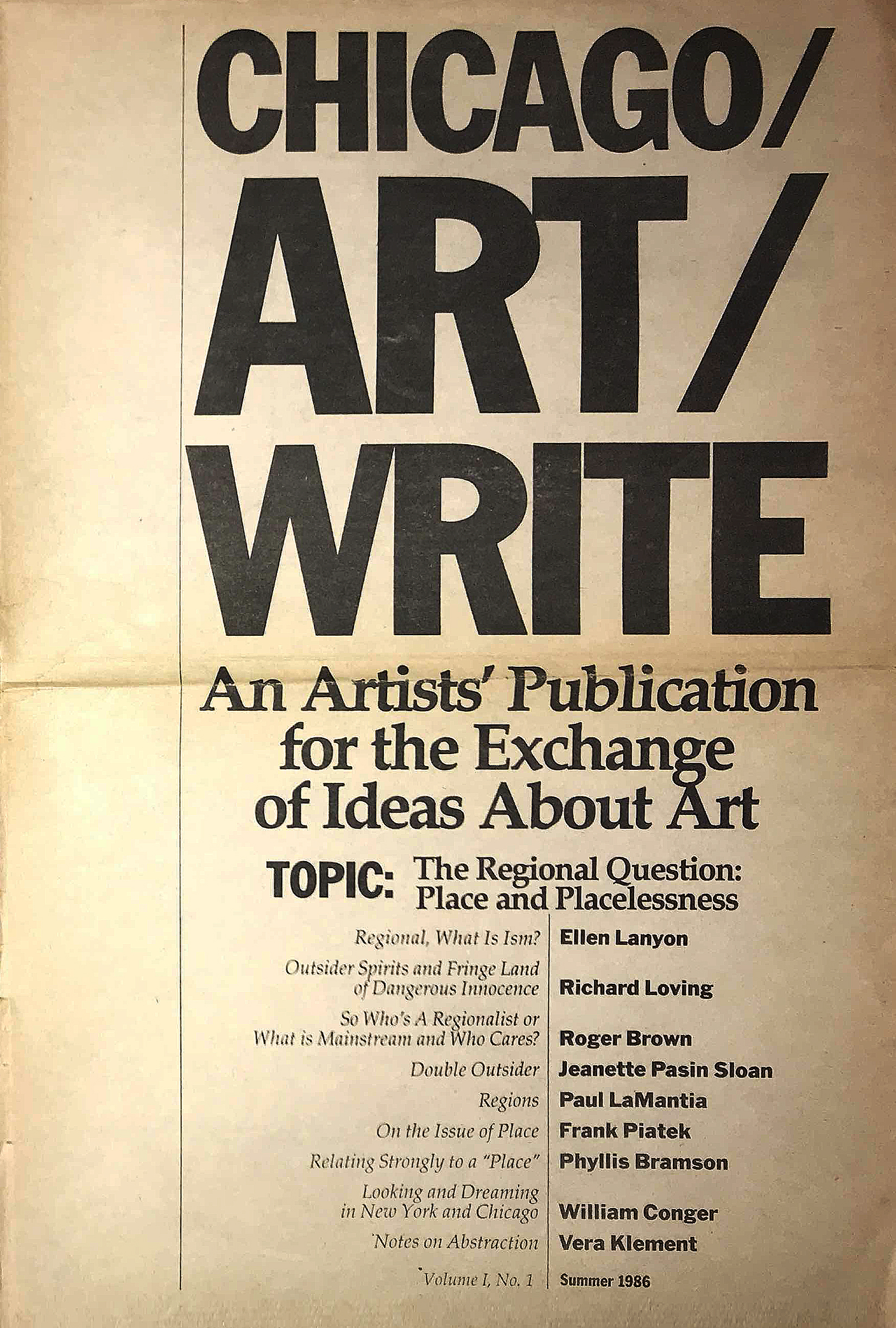
Chicago/Art/Write, cover, Vol. 1, No. 1, Summer 1986. Publication featuring artist-authors, founded and edited by William Conger, Frank Piatek and Richard Loving.

=== Chicago/Art/Write ===
In 1986, Conger, Frank Piatek and Richard Loving started the publication Chicago/Art/Write, which featured themselves and other artists, such as Vera Klement and Roger Brown, discussing their ideas. Organized around themes, such as "Regionalism" or "Figuration, Representation and Realism," the self-distributed publication was printed with the support of the School of the Art Institute of Chicago (SAIC). Conger was a contributor and editor until it ceased in 1991. Conger's article in the "New Abstract Painting" issue, "Abstract Painting: Fact, Fiction, Paradox," contains a passage crystallizing his thoughts on Greenberg's premise of flatness:

Greenberg's brilliant criticism may have led to the truth of what painting is, but that flat truth turned out to be less interesting than the lies of illusionism. ... The most fundamental feature of painting is not flatness, but what flatness allows—a presentation of pictorial space and its capacity to present filled or void images as being on the same plane and in the same place, all at once, and to show time passing without motion. The paradoxical nature of pictorial space is the subject of abstract painting; its content is our feeling and experience.

Chicago/Art/Write ran into trouble with its 1991 "Difficult Art" issue, which provided a forum for discussing two controversial local shows: a graphic performance by artist Joy Poe and an SAIC exhibition featuring an American flag on the floor, which viewers stepped on to participate. Both sparked scandal—the city shut the latter show down—and SAIC, wishing to avoid reigniting controversy, shut down the publication. All issues were confiscated, and few still exist.

== Teaching and education ==
Conger began a forty-year career in education at Rock Valley College (1966–71). While there, he was joined by realist painter James Valerio, who would become a lifelong friend and colleague. In 1971, Conger was appointed as chair of the Department of Art and Art History at DePaul University. He served there until 1984, when Northwestern University's Department of Art Theory and Practice hired him on the recommendation of Imagist painter Ed Paschke. In 1985, the department appointed Conger as professor and chair, and also hired Valerio. The three artists showed together in "Painting at Northwestern: Conger, Paschke, Valerio" (1986) at the university's Mary and Leigh Block Museum. When Paschke died in 2004, Conger eulogized him at the Art Institute and Northwestern.

Conger retired as Professor Emeritus in 2006. His legacy includes the appointments of artists Judy Ledgerwood and Jean Dunning as professors, and accomplished former students Michelle Grabner, Anna Kunz, John Sabraw, Joan Backes, Maria Tomasula, Chris Cosnowski and Chris Kahler. Conger's teaching approach was open, but traditional in terms of his belief in studio practice. He also encouraged artists to be literate, well-informed readers, writers and thinkers, and initiated use of the GRE standardized exam as part of the studio admissions process, seeking students who took scholarship seriously.

== Awards and collections ==
Conger's art is represented in numerous public and private collections, including those of the: Art Institute of Chicago, Georgia Museum of Art, MCA, Illinois State Museum, McCormick Place, Art Museum of West Virginia University, Smart Museum of Art, Madison Museum of Contemporary Art, Mitchell Museum, and Eli and Edythe Broad, among many. He has been recognized with a Pollock-Krasner Foundation grant (2011), City of Chicago Public Commissions (2001–2, 2014), inclusion in the Smithsonian Archives of American Art, and Illinois Arts Council grants (2009, 2012).
