= Richard Loving (disambiguation) =

Richard Loving may refer to:

- Mildred and Richard Loving, plaintiffs in the U.S. Supreme Court case Loving v. Virginia
- Loving v. Virginia, 1967 U.S. Supreme Court case abolishing restrictions on interracial marriage
- Richard Loving (artist) (1924–2021), American painter
