= Hans-Heinrich Lieb =

German linguist

Hans-Heinrich Lieb is emeritus professor at the Freie Universität Berlin and is the originator of the linguistic framework of Integrational linguistics (IL).
