= Joan Backes =

American artist

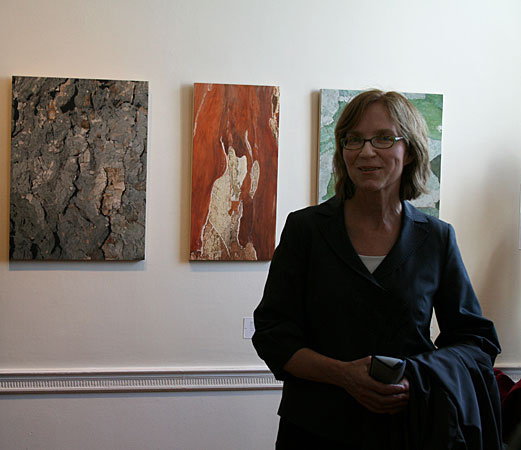
Joan Backes with TREE, Wave Hill, New York, paintings on the wall.

Joan Backes (born in Milwaukee, Wisconsin) is an American artist. Backes is known for her paintings which record different species of tree bark and for her installations, most recently her house series. Her work addresses issues of nature in contemporary society.

== Early life ==
Backes received her MFA in Painting from Northwestern University, Department of Art Theory and Practice where she worked with Ed Paschke and William Conger. She received an MA in Painting at the University of Missouri. She received her undergraduate degree from the University of Iowa, Iowa City, Iowa.

== Career ==
Since 2000, Backes' paintings have focused on trees and the effects of overdevelopment. Her installations focus on the house as an image and symbol and often incorporate site-specific materials. Backes' Carpet of Leaves often uses over 1000 leaves in each installation, bringing the outside to the gallery or museum.

Public collections currently holding Backes' work include the Newport Art Museum in Newport, Rhode Island, the Rhode Island School of Design Museum in Providence, Rhode Island, Smith College Museum of Art in Northampton, Massachusetts, The Milwaukee Art Museum in Milwaukee, Wisconsin, the Nelson-Atkins Museum of Art in Kansas City, Missouri, the Joslyn Art Museum in Omaha, Nebraska, the Racine Art Museum in Racine, Wisconsin, the Mulvane Art Museum in Topeka, Kansas, the Nerman Museum of Art in Overland Park, Kansas, the Rauma Art Museum in Finland, the Aberdeen Art Gallery in Scotland, the Reykjavik Art Museum in Iceland, the Hafnarborg Institute of Culture and Fine Art Museum in Iceland, the Spencer Museum of Art in Lawrence, Kansas, the Wright Museum of Art in Beloit, Wisconsin, the Boston Public Library in Boston, Massachusetts, the John Hay Library at Brown University, Providence, Rhode Island, and the Beach Museum of Art, KSU, among others.

Permanent installations of Backes' work include Internationales Waldkunst Odenwald Forest, Darmstadt, Germany; Berlin / Grunewald, Berlin, Germany; Linnaean Garden, Uppsala, Sweden; Silpakorn University Art Atrium, Bangkok, Thailand; and Nova Scotia College of Art and Design, Canada.

Backes has taught at Brown University, Nova Scotia College of Art and Design, Maine College of Art Graduate Program, Rhode Island School of Design, The Kansas City Art Institute, and Northwestern University.
