= Frank Piatek =

American artist (1944–2026)

- Born: 1944; Chicago, Illinois, United States
- Died: January 2026 (aged 81–82)
- Education: School of the Art Institute of Chicago
- Known for: Painting, Drawing, Installation art
- Spouse: Judith Geichman
- Awards: National Endowment for the Arts, Illinois Arts Council

Frank Piatek, Untitled, oil on canvas, 1967

Frank Piatek (1944–2026) was an American artist, known for abstract, illusionistic paintings of tubular forms and three-dimensional works exploring spirituality, cultural memory and the creative process. Piatek emerged in the mid-1960s, among a group of Chicago artists exploring various types of organic abstraction that shared qualities with the Chicago Imagists; his work, however relies more on suggestion than expressionistic representation. In Art in Chicago 1945-1995, the Museum of Contemporary Art, Chicago (MCA) described Piatek as playing “a crucial role in the development and refinement of abstract painting in Chicago" with carefully rendered, biomorphic compositions that illustrate the dialectical relationship between Chicago's idiosyncratic abstract and figurative styles.

Piatek's work has been exhibited at institutions including the Whitney Museum, Art Institute of Chicago, MCA Chicago, National Museum, Szczecin in Poland, and Terra Museum of American Art; it belongs to the public art collections of the Art Institute of Chicago and MCA Chicago, among others. Curator Lynne Warren described Piatek as "the quintessential Chicago artist—a highly individualistic, introspective outsider" who developed a "unique and deeply felt world view from an artistically isolated vantage point." Piatek lived and worked in Chicago with his wife, painter and SAIC professor Judith Geichman, and taught at the School of the Art Institute of Chicago from 1974 through the end of 2025.

== Life and career ==
Francis Piatek, Jr. was born in 1944 in Chicago into a Polish- and Swedish-American family. His late father, Frank, Sr., was a community activist and neighborhood association president and has honorific street signs in his name. Piatek was raised in the city's ethnic Irving Park neighborhood and began creating art when he attended nearby Lane Technical High School, which bordered the Riverview amusement park; in the 1970s, when he rented a studio across from the park after it closed, its ruins played a role in his work of the time. After a childhood in which he was stricken with polio, he studied at the School of the Art Institute (SAIC), earning BFA (1967) and MFA (1971) degrees. He attracted critical attention as an undergraduate, including a 1967 studio visit by Whitney Museum curator John Baur and Hyde Park Art Center (HPAC) director Don Baum that led to his inclusion in the 1968 Whitney Biennial; that same year, he received a Ryerson Travel fellowship from SAIC.

Piatek used the grant to study and travel throughout Europe for a year, filling notebooks with sketches, while developing a sense of the continuity of history that would fuel ideas throughout his career. Over the next decade, after returning to Chicago, Piatek appeared in exhibitions at the Art Institute of Chicago (AIC), MCA Chicago, National Gallery of Canada and Renaissance Society, and had solo shows at N.A.M.E. Gallery (1975), HPAC (1969) and Phyllis Kind Gallery (1972), which was associated with the city's Imagist artists. In subsequent years, Piatek had solo exhibitions at the Roy Boyd and Richard Gray galleries, and was featured in shows at the MCA Chicago, AIC, Chicago Cultural Center, HPAC, Terra Museum of American Art, and Smart Museum of Art. Piatek died in January 2026.

== Work and reception ==
Frank Piatek, Untitled (small X painting), acrylic on canvas, 24" x 23.5", 1967

Art writers such as Mary Mathews Gedo and James Yood have described Piatek's work as lying outside dominant artistic orders, such as Abstract Expressionism, Pop Art, Minimalism, or (in Chicago) Imagism, sidestepping the limitations of such movements regarding real-world forms, illusion, or content. They categorize his art into two bodies: more widely known images of intertwined, tubular forms; and primal works of sculpture, collage and installation that reveal his inner thoughts and creative process. Despite their abstraction, his tubular works drew on figurative art—from Renaissance and Baroque artists such as Michelangelo, Caravaggio and Velasquez to more modern figures like Manet, Léger and Balthus—and abstractionists, such as Frank Stella; both bodies explore symbolic forms from ancient sources, such as the Book of Kells, the caduceus, and Aztec, Minoan and pharaonic Egyptian iconography. Gedo and Yood have written that Piatek's work hovers between abstraction and figuration, providing a screen to stage open-ended, "sensuous and seductive dramas" alluding to biology, sexuality, machine elements, and spirituality. Dennis Adrian tied Piatek's interests in the mythic, metaphysical and elemental to both the Romantic temperament and visionary aspects of Chicago art.

=== Early work ===
As an undergraduate, Piatek created two groups of paintings that brought early recognition. One employed shaped canvasses—wave, "X," or upside-down "U" forms—that featured stripes or tubes, often following the contours of the canvas edge, such as Untitled (small X painting) (1967). Writers described them as direct responses to Frank Stella's minimalist stripe paintings that nonetheless broke with the era's dominant Greenbergian formalism by employing chiaroscuro modeling and illusionistic space rather than affirming the flatness of the picture plane (as Stella did). Piatek also experimented with a motif of monumental, writhing tubular forms (e.g., Untitled, 1967); these works were his first awarded prizes (in the AIC 1967 and 1968 "Chicago and Vicinity" shows) and acquired by a museum (AIC, 1970).

The tubular paintings became a trademark body of work that explored wide-ranging variations for four decades. Piatek painted them as twisting, patterned and symmetrical forms that emerge out of dark, packed, enigmatic space; reviewers such as Franz Schulze and Jane Allen described them as evoking close-up magnification of organic (bodies, limbs, phalluses, worms, intestines, trees), man-made (coils, ropes, chains, metal piping, knots, balloons), and symbolic forms. They further characterize this work as featuring forceful drawing and rhythmical design that suggests coiled energy, subtle wet-on-wet modeling, cross-hatched brushwork and active surfaces, luminous color, and glowing ethereal light. In the 1970s, Allen called them "portholes into a dimly lit fluorescent world of intertwining, undulating forms" that became a "fascinating exercise in the primary sensations of form"; Schulze described them as formally sober, seemingly abstract works that suggest visceral figurative associations, eroticism, fantasy and magic.

Frank Piatek, N.A.M.E. Gallery installation, mixed media, 1975

Piatek developed his second body of introverted, shamanistic work in the early 1970s, during a time of personal and artistic crisis; writers identify key its themes as death and rebirth, macrocosm and microcosm, myth and the collective unconscious. He was initially inspired by a mural commission that sought a landscape or tree image, leading him to experiment with sinuous, archetypal forms and emblematic hieroglyphs. He pursued this direction privately in directly referential, symbolic drawings of spiders and trees, artifact-like sculpture, and carvings of snakes, stars, podlike sarcophagi and dead men in boats, covered in mud, twine and fabric. The new work ended his relationship with Phyllis Kind Gallery, but culminated in an experimental installation at the alternative N.A.M.E. Gallery (1975), featuring a ritual-like arrangement alongside his established tube images. Several reviews noted the interplay between the primal imagery and contemporary paintings, as well as the insights into Piatek's heretofore hidden process and inspirations. Franz Schulze called the carvings persuasive, "fetishistic objects … sinister, private things, like effigies, full of atavistic implications;" Derek Guthrie, however, found the primitive approach less convincing and over-intellectualized. Piatek continued to explore this more intimate work in various media and formats throughout his career.

Frank Piatek, Glowing Forms, oil alkyd on canvas, 62" x 72", 1984

=== "Allusive Abstraction" ===
In the early 1980s, Piatek and the Chicago painters William Conger, Miyoko Ito and Richard Loving formed a group based on a shared interest in abstraction that embraced real-world associations, illusionism, and form as metaphor. They coined the label "Allusive Abstraction" for their approach, eventually promoting their ideas through Chicago Art Write, an artist-written publication co-edited by Piatek, Conger and Loving. The group's collective effort attracted critical attention in national publications and generated traveling exhibitions of Chicago abstraction. Piatek also moved to Roy Boyd Gallery (six solo shows, 1984–2001)—well-known for its focus on abstractionists, including Conger and Loving—to further highlight their mutual concerns.

During that period, Piatek continued to explore similar formal concerns in his tube motif, but experimented widely with painting techniques and materials ranging from old-master glazing techniques to methods adapted from modernists like Willem de Kooning to acrylic paint. These new methods—inspired by research for an SAIC painting course he developed—shifted his work toward a more layered, soft-edged, painterly approach with a loosening of form, more rhythmic surface activity, and more brilliant color and spatial depth (e.g., Glowing Forms, 1984). Critics such as Alan Artner and Christopher Lyon identified a greater sense of eroticism in the work, alternately comparing it to the fleshy ruddiness of Rubens, the odalisques of Ingres, and musculature of Michelangelo. Reviewing several exhibitions, they also noted that the work of this period emphasized Piatek's drawing more, both within his paintings and in delicate willow and vine charcoal works on paper that he exhibited.

Frank Piatek, Untitled (collage), acrylic photocopy transfer, 1994

=== Collages, assemblages and installations ===
In an "upstairs-downstairs" format exhibition (Roy Boyd Gallery, 1987) reflecting his studio set-up, Piatek introduced a new medium in his more intimate body of work: a decade's worth of collage-assemblages on the theme of art-making, which he displayed in a lower gallery beneath his paintings on the main floor. The collage work breaks with linear time, joining photocopy-transferred, early notebook images (of Piatek, his studio and ceremonial objects), present work, text, and mythic forms in an overlay of memory and archetype that suggests both a psychic archaeology and connection to a greater collectivity. Critics such as Alan Artner and Andy Argy described these combinations of mixed-media, layered marks and processes as among his most elaborate works—dark, distilled stream-of-conscious pictorial diaries engaging genealogies of cultural history that reveal the sensibilities and interplay of abstraction and figuration underlying his paintings.

Piatek extended this exploration of the creative process Ii several later installations. He mounted two double-installations with his wife, painter Judith Geichman—Studio Process Residue (1999) and Picturing the Studio (2009)—that explored studio residue (raw materials, sketches, books, sources) as a companion text illuminating the artist's work; in both shows, they each created representations of their studios, including finished work. Almost Voyage Time/Traveler’s Report (2008) was an altar-like installation of two boat/pod forms from which paper tags marked with drawing, symbols and text fragments hung, suggesting a gathering of material for transformation. The installations Kerux Aion (2007–8) and Theater of the Concealed Index (2014) continued Piatek's emphasis on text and the act of mark-making, combining drawings of words with myriad tags or pieces of cut paper that were marked and painted, often with iconic symbols or patterns, and hung in rows by twine.

== Teaching and writing ==
Piatek taught art for more than four decades, primarily at the School of the Art Institute of Chicago (SAIC). After a year at Washington University in St. Louis (1973–74), and several years teaching part-time at SAIC (1971–72, 1974–1984), he accepted a full-time position at SAIC in 1984, which he held until his death in 2026. From 1990 to 1993, he served as Co-Chair of the Painting Program with Richard Loving. In 1976, Piatek researched and reconceived the school's "Materials and Techniques of Painting" course, introducing contemporary theoretical discourse, such as that era's so-called "Death [End] of Painting crisis,” as well as a wide range of historical painting processes; the course has continued for over four decades. He also conceived and developed a longstanding lecture/studio course, "The Spiritual in Art," in 1991. Piatek has written and lectured about drawing, abstraction, regionalism, and the spiritual in art in Whitewalls and Chicago/Art/Write and at the College Art Association.

== Collections and recognition ==
Piatek's work belongs to several public art collections, including those of the Art Institute of Chicago, MCA Chicago, Arkansas Art Center, C.N. Gorman Museum at UC Davis, Elmhurst College, Illinois State Museum, Mary and Leigh Block Museum of Art, Minneapolis Institute of Art, Smart Museum of Art, University Club of Chicago, and Washington State University Museum of Art. He has been awarded National Endowment for the Arts (1985), Illinois Arts Council (1980), and Francis Ryerson Foreign Travel (1967) fellowships, as well as the Pauline Palmer Award and John G. Curtis Prize from the Art Institute of Chicago, among honors.
