= Miyoko Ito =

American painter (1918–1983)

- Born: April 27, 1918; Berkeley, California
- Died: August 18, 1983 (aged 65); Chicago, Illinois
- Known for: Painting
- Movement: Abstract Art
- Spouse: Harry Ichiyasu (m. 1942)
- Awards: Guggenheim Fellowship (1977)

Miyoko Ito (April 27, 1918–August 18, 1983) was an American artist known for her watercolor and abstract oil paintings and prints. Ito was part of an informal group of like-minded, but visually diverse Chicago painters, self-named the "Allusive Abstractionists" and formed in 1981. The group, which also included William Conger, Richard Loving and Frank Piatek, was formed to spark dialogue and make space for a wider conception of abstraction that included more subjective, metaphorical work. Though tangentially involved with the Chicago Imagists, Ito's own style diverged and synthesized cubism and surrealism.

Ito was born in Berkeley, California, on April 27, 1918, to Japanese parents, but returned to Japan with her family in 1923 to receive a traditional Japanese art education and escape discrimination. Five years later, the Itos returned to California, where Miyoko went to the University of California, Berkeley and studied art. There, she was exposed to the ideas of the School of Paris, Hans Hofman, and cubism, all of which influenced her later work. Just before her graduation in 1942, as a Japanese American, she was sent to the Tanforan internment camp near San Francisco following the signing of Executive Order 9066. Though imprisoned in the American concentration camp at Topaz during World War II, Ito was granted her diploma. After her release, she studied at Smith College and the Art Institute of Chicago.

She was awarded a Guggenheim Fellowship in 1977.

She died on August 18, 1983, in Chicago, Illinois.

The Berkeley Art Museum and Pacific Film Archive exhibited a small retrospective of her work in 2018, renewing interest in the artist's work.
