= Integrational theory of grammars =

The integrational theory of grammars is the theory of linguistic descriptions that has been developed within the general linguistic approach of integrational linguistics.

== Overview ==
Differently from most other approaches in linguistics, integrational linguistics emphasizes a distinction between theories of language and theories of language descriptions. Integrational linguistics has, therefore, developed both a general theory of language, the integrational theory of language, and a theory of linguistic descriptions.

In integrational linguistics, a description of a language is understood as a theory (formulated by the linguist) of the language; similarly, for descriptions of varieties or individual idiolects. Traditionally, grammars are most important among such descriptions, which also include descriptions of (parts of) the variety structure of a language, such as a description of a language's development in time or distribution in geographical space. "Grammar" is here used in a broad sense, covering not only morphological and syntactic but also phonological and semantic descriptions. A description of the lexicon, i.e. a dictionary, is again construed as a theory of its object (Drude 2004). Since the integrational theory of grammars deals with the relation between language descriptions and their objects, it presupposes both the integrational theory of linguistic variability and the integrational theory of language systems.

On an IL view, grammars have three fundamental properties:

1. Ideally, they are empirical axiomatic theories. IL does not propose to replace traditional, non-axiomatic grammars by axiomatic theories. Rather, an axiomatic format for grammars is seen as an ideal reference-point for non-axiomatic, declarative grammars that allows for a more stringent formulation of such grammars, a formulation that avoids inconsistencies and circularities without having explicit resort to axiomatization. The empirical basis of grammars is ultimately seen in acts of communication on the one hand and mental states and events on the other: it is such acts or states and events that directly or indirectly provide the data for a grammar.
2. Grammars are to be formulated so as to account for language variability both within and between languages, i.e., they must presuppose a theory of linguistic variability.
3. They are formulated "in terms of" a theory of language: a grammar includes terms, definitions, assumptions, and theorems from a theory of language that is presupposed in the grammar. These are used in the grammar (i) to provide descriptive terms for categories and other entities of the language under description, and (ii) to interact with terms, definitions, assumptions, and theorems that are specific to the grammar.

Typically, the axioms and theorems of a grammar of a language or language variety are formulated as universal implications over the systems of the idiolects in the given language or variety. For example, a traditional statement on a language variety, such as

hack "taxi" is a noun in Colloquial American English.

is construed as equivalent to

For all S: If S is a system of some element of Colloquial American English, then <hack, "taxi"> is an element of Noun-of-S.

which may be a sentence of a grammar that contains "Colloquial American English" as an axiomatic constant, denoting a certain subset of English.

Generally, an integrational grammar is not an algorithm but a "declarative" theory: its formulae have the form of statements; thus, the grammar's axioms and theorems can be understood directly as statements on the language, variety or idiolect described by the grammar. Excepting the language needed for formulating the semantic part of a grammar, integrational grammars may be formulated using an appropriate version of set theory.
