= Integrational theory of language =

The Integrational theory of language is the general theory of language that has been developed within the general linguistic approach of integrational linguistics.

Differently from most other approaches in linguistics, integrational linguistics emphasizes a distinction between theories of language and theories of language descriptions. Integrational linguistics has therefore developed both a general theory of language and a theory of linguistic descriptions, the integrational theory of grammars.

The integrational theory of language contains two major subtheories: (i) the integrational theory of linguistic variability, which is 'conflated' with (ii) the integrational theory of language systems.

One of the most distinctive features of the integrational theory of language is its adherence to ontological explicitness and constructiveness: the ontological status of every linguistic entity postulated by the theory is clearly determined (explicitness), and every entity is a logical or set-theoretical construct ultimately related to a small number of sets of basic entities that include, in particular, objects and events in space-time (constructiveness).

== The integrational theory of linguistic variability ==
=== Linguistic variability ===
From its inception, IL has regarded linguistic variability, i.e. the changeability of languages along dimensions such as time, geographical space, social stratification etc., as an essential property of natural languages that has to be treated in any realistic theory of language; certain idealizations, such as Chomsky's 'completely homogeneous speech-community,' are rejected.

The Integrational Theory of Linguistic Variability thus aims at providing a theoretical framework for variation research (including studies in sociolinguistics, dialectology, and historical linguistics) and a basis for a realistic theory of language systems. The theory centers around the notion of 'idiolect,' in a specific sense of the term that avoids traditional problems: an idiolect is a homogeneous part of an individual speaker's share of a language (a speaker's total share of a language, called a 'personal variety,' is not an idiolect in this sense but is a set of idiolects). Such an idiolect, understood as an individual (linguistic) means of communication of a person during a certain period of time, simultaneously belongs to a certain period of the language, to a certain dialect, sociolect, register, medial variety, etc. A natural language (understood as a historical language during the entire span of its existence, or a period – a major temporal part – of a historical language) is construed as a set of idiolects, and each variety of the language is a subset of the language. Sets of idiolects (such as languages and their varieties) are called 'communication complexes.' The varieties of a language are given through its 'variety structure': a classification system whose source is the language itself.

=== Idiolects and idiolect systems ===
Ontologically, an idiolect is construed as a (possibly infinite) set of abstract sentences: form-meaning pairs consisting, in the case of a spoken rather than a written or signed idiolect, of a structured phonetic sound sequence and a meaning of this sequence. For each idiolect in a language, there is a system (idiolect system) that specifies which form-meaning pairs are elements of the idiolect. Every idiolect system consists of (technically: is an n-tuple whose components are) a phonetic, phonological, morphological, syntactic, lexico-semantic, and sentence-semantic part; and each part determines a different type of properties that the form-meaning pairs must have in order to belong to the idiolect. In written idiolect systems, the phonetic and phonological parts are replaced by a graphetic and a graphematic part, in signed idiolect systems by a cheremic and a cherematic part. (There may be other components in addition to the ones listed above; the precise structure of idiolect systems is a matter of ongoing research.) The parts of an idiolect system are grouped into the sound system (script system, chereme system), the morpho-syntactic (or grammatical) subsystem, and the semantic subsystem of the idiolect system. (There is no pragmatic part or subsystem – 'pragmatic' properties of form-meaning pairs, as far as they are determined by the idiolect system itself, are covered by the semantic subsystem, or else indirectly by the idiolect's place in the variety structure.) Finally, a system for a language (or language variety) is a construct of properties shared by every system of every idiolect in the language (or language variety). Idiolects, varieties, languages, and their systems are all construed as extramental and abstract.

Systems of idiolects (idiolect systems) and systems for languages differ from each other both ontologically and in their relation to speakers' minds. Idiolect systems are n-tuples (as specified above) whereas language systems are sets of properties of such n-tuples. Moreover, for every idiolect that is a means of communication for a given speaker, there must be a (psychological and physiological) internal basis in the speaker that corresponds to a system of this idiolect, but there is no such internal basis for entire language systems. From an IL point of view, distinguishing between language systems, idiolect systems, idiolects (themselves no systems), and speaker-internal bases for idiolects is a cornerstone for a realistic theory of natural languages and language use.

A full representation of the Integrational Theory of Linguistic Variability and discussion of rival theories can be found in Lieb (1993); for the conceptions of languages and idiolects, see also Lieb (1983), Part A.

== The integrational theory of language systems ==
=== General features ===
The Integrational Theory of Linguistic Variability is conflated with the Integrational Theory of Language Systems. The latter is concerned mainly with (i) making general assumptions on the properties of idiolect systems in arbitrary languages and (ii) developing a conceptual framework, and corresponding terminology, for their description.

The well-known problems in defining a truly universal terminology (applicable in the description of arbitrary languages) in the face of linguistic diversity are tackled in Integrational Linguistics by making a number of essential meta-theoretic distinctions, implicit in linguistic tradition but typically blurred in modern approaches.

Most importantly, a distinction is made between the definition of a term and the identification of corresponding linguistic entities in given idiolect systems. For example, terms such as 'phoneme,' 'suffix,' 'verb,' 'singular,' 'accusative,' etc. are construed not as categorial terms (denoting sets of linguistic entities) but as names of two-place relations ('is-a-phoneme-of,' 'is-a-suffix-of,' etc.) between linguistic entities and idiolect systems S (e.g., SLEEP is-a-verb-of S_{E}, SCHLAFEN is-a-verb-of S_{G}, where S_{E} and S_{G} are, respectively, an English and a German idiolect system: one and the same relation [is-a-]verb[-of] holds between SLEEP and S_{E}, SCHLAFEN and S_{G}, etc.). Names for categories of a given idiolect system are then derived from such relational terms: the expression 'verb of S_{E}' denotes the set of all verbs of S_{E} (a category), i.e., denotes the set of all linguistic entities that are related to idiolect system S_{E} by the relation [is a ]verb[ of]. While the relational term 'verb' is defined in the Integrational Theory of Language Systems so as to allow for arbitrary idiolect systems, the corresponding categories (verb in S_{E}, verb in S_{G}, etc.) must be identified in a grammar for individual idiolect systems, and the identifying properties may vary greatly among the systems of idiolects in different languages or even within a single language. It is a task not of a general theory of language but of theories of individual languages or language varieties – e.g., of individual grammars – to formulate identifying properties for the entities (categories, etc.) postulated for the idiolect systems of a given language (or variety). (Consider, for instance, a language in whose idiolect systems S all infinitive forms of verbs – and only such forms – have a certain prefix, giving rise to an identifying property for the category infinitive-in-S in the idiolect systems of this language. Clearly, this criterion should not be used to define the term 'infinitive' in a general theory of language.) Given this distinction, a term like 'verb' may be defined by means of word- or sentence-semantic criteria; the syntactic nature of the corresponding categories in individual idiolect systems is still guaranteed by the fact that the categories can be identified by resort to the syntactic means of the idiolect systems (morphological marking, word order, intonation) and, possibly, properties of lexical meanings. Defining a term in a general theory of language does not, however, imply that there are corresponding entities in all idiolect systems (for instance, we can formulate a general definition of 'adjective' although there may be languages without adjectives).

The elements of a category in a given idiolect system may, and usually will, have additional relevant properties not needed for identifying the category. (In the above example, the infinitive forms may show certain tense distinctions.) Such properties must still be included in a complete characterization of the category. Finally, each entity proposed by a general theory of language or by a theory of an individual language, variety, or idiolect should also be justified by metatheoretic considerations. Consider, for example, the set of all adjective forms of a given English idiolect system whose sound sequences start with /bl/. Such a set should hardly be postulated as a syntactic category of this idiolect system, even though the set would easily be identified, and a corresponding term would easily be defined.

From an IL point of view, distinguishing between the definition of a term, the identification and characterization of a corresponding entity in an individual idiolect system, and the justification for postulating such an entity in a theory of a specific language, is a prerequisite both for formulating a general theory of language (one of the main goals of linguistics) and for successfully integrating theories of individual languages or language varieties with such a theory. Integrational Linguistics appears to be the only modern approach to explicitly adopt the fourfold distinction between definition, identification, characterization and justification, implicit in Western linguistic tradition with its insistence on the semantic definition of many general terms used in identifying syntactic entities as described in individual grammars. — For a detailed discussion of the underlying metatheoretic principles, see, in particular, Budde (2000): chapter 1; for an application in a general theory of parts of speech, using German for orientation, see Budde (2000): chapters 2–10.

Reflecting the basic structure of spoken idiolect systems (see above), the Integrational Theory of Language Systems comprises Integrational Phonology, Integrational Morpho-Syntax (with Integrational Morphology and Integrational Syntax), and Integrational Semantics (Integrational Lexical Semantics, including morpho-semantics and word semantics, and Integrational Sentence Semantics). For medial types of idiolect systems other than the spoken one, suitable subtheories – corresponding to Integrational Phonology – are provided for but have not yet been worked out in detail (Integrational Graphematics for written, Integrational Cherematics for signed idiolect systems).

The most detailed representation to date of the Integrational Theory of Language Systems as a whole (excluding Integrational Phonology) is found in Lieb (1983): parts B to F); for Integrational Syntax see also Lieb (1993), for Integrational Semantics Lieb (1979, 1980, 1992). Integrational Phonology (the last component of the theory to be developed) is presented in Lieb (1998, 2008). For major applications of IL in linguistic description, see, for example, Richter (1988), Moltmann (1992), and Eisenberg (1998/1999), concentrating on German; Sackmann (2004) for Mandarin Chinese; see also the contributions in Sackmann (ed.) (2008). The conception of (morphological and syntactic) paradigms, fundamental in IL, has recently been further elaborated in Lieb (2005).

=== Integrational phonology ===
Integrational Phonology is a 'declarative' two-level phonology that postulates two distinct levels (or 'parts') in the sound system of any idiolect system, a less abstract phonetic and a more abstract phonological one. Phonetic and phonological sounds are both conceived as sets of auditory properties of speech-sound events, hence, as abstract real-world entities. (Speech-sound events are concrete entities, located in space-time.) Phonological sounds differ from phonetic ones by a higher degree of abstraction: While sounds on the phonetic level (i.e., part) of an idiolect system contain all properties that characterize normal utterances of entities of the idiolect system, phonological sounds contain only those properties that are functional in the idiolect system, i.e., are relevant with respect to distinctions in the morphological, syntactic, or semantic parts of the system.

Phonological words and morphs (on the phonological level) as well as phonetic words (on the phonetic level) are construed as 'structured sound sequences,' that is, ordered pairs consisting of (1) a phonetic or phonological sound sequence (called the 'basis' of the morph or word) and (2) a phonetic or phonological structure of the sound sequence – itself a pair of (2a) a constituent structure and (2b) an intonation structure of the sound sequence. ('Sequence' is understood in the Integrational Theory of Language in a specific, set-theoretical sense that allows for the limiting cases of empty and one-member or 'unit sequences.') The constituent structure relates parts of the sound sequence to one of the sound categories Vocalic-in-S, Consonantal-in-S, and VocalicGroup-in-S, thereby determining a syllable sequence (possibly empty) for the sound sequence. The sound categories (simultaneously belonging to the phonetic and the phonological level) are uniformly construed as sets not of individual sounds but of sound sequences of the idiolect system, allowing a treatment of affricates and long consonants (elements of Consonantal-in-S), diphthongs and long vowels (elements of Vocalic-in-S) and the like alongside simple vowels and consonants. The intonation structure assigns sets of 'auditory values' (pitches, degrees of loudness, phonation modes etc.) to the syllables of a (syllabic) sound sequence identified by the constituent structure. Prosodic phenomena in both accent languages and tone languages are then treated in a unified way: differences of tone or stress are represented through sets of auditory values directly within a specific component of a phonological word, namely, the phonological intonation structure, which is properly linked to the (syntactic) intonation structures of syntactic units in which the phonological word occurs; and tone languages differ from accent languages mainly in the way phonological intonation structures are 'processed' in syntactic intonation structures. The constituents of a structured sound sequence are connected through phonological relations (p-nucleus, p-complement, p-modifier).

The phonetic-phonological properties of an idiolect system are to a large degree determined by the way sound sequences combine to form more complex ones, and the way phonetic sound sequences are related to phonological ones. There is a 'connection function' on the phonological level that takes pairs of structured sound sequences and assigns to each pair another such sequence, and a 'connection function' on the phonetic level that takes such pairs and assigns to each pair a set of structured sound sequences. Both levels are connected through a 'variant relation' relating structured phonetic sound sequences to structured phonological sound sequences. While the two connection functions jointly represent the 'phonotactics' of the idiolect system, the variant relation is only partly analogous to the 'allophone' relation in structuralist phonology and avoids its problems (treatment of diphthongs, affricates etc.) by connecting structured phonetic with structured phonological sound sequences instead of connecting individual sounds. Phonetic variants of a complex structured phonological sound sequence may be determined not only phonetically but also phonologically, by underlying sequences on the phonological level. The variant relation is postulated as a third component of the sound system of an idiolect system, in addition to its phonetic and phonological parts.

=== Integrational syntax and morphology ===
Integrational Syntax is akin in spirit to Lexical Functional Grammar, notwithstanding basic differences, and includes essential ideas of Valency Grammar. Among modern approaches to syntax, Integrational Syntax may well be closest to the grammatical tradition as it has developed in the West since antiquity. In particular, Integrational Syntax is Word-and-Paradigm, an orientation that has recently been gaining followers also elsewhere in linguistics. Integrational Syntax is a surface syntax: no 'deep structures' and no empty syntactic units or categories are allowed; true, an 'empty phonological word,' properly defined, is assumed for the treatment of phenomena such as ellipsis, and the empty sequence is used to deal with so-called optional complements. Integrational Syntax is also a 'syntax as a basis for semantics' in the sense that every meaning of a complex syntactic unit is obtained from the lexical meanings of its primitive meaningful parts on the basis of one of its structures. (The nature of lexical meanings is specified in Integrational Lexical Semantics, while ontological questions regarding syntactic meanings and the details of syntactic-semantic meaning composition are treated in Integrational Sentence Semantics.)

Among the syntactic entities postulated in Integrational Syntax for the syntactic part of arbitrary idiolect systems, there are: syntactic base forms, syntactic units, syntactic paradigms, lexical words, syntactic categories (either syntactic unit categories or word categories), syntactic structures, and syntactic functions.

A syntactic unit of an idiolect system is a sequence of syntactic base forms. (Again, unit sequences, but not the empty sequence, are allowed as a limiting case of syntactic units, that is, a syntactic unit may contain a single syntactic base form.) In a system of a spoken idiolect, the syntactic base forms are precisely the phonological words occurring in the phonological part of the system (analogously, for systems of written and signed idiolects).

It is an essential feature of Integrational Syntax that a clear distinction is made between lexical words and forms of lexical words (called 'syntactic word forms' or simply 'syntactic words'): every lexical word is an ordered pair consisting of a syntactic paradigm or 'word paradigm' (the form component of the word) and a concept that is a meaning of the paradigm (the meaning component of the word); a syntactic paradigm is a (non-empty) set of pairs, each consisting of a syntactic word form and a 'categorization' of the word form, that is, a set of syntactic categories such that the word form is an element of each category in the set; and any syntactic word form is also a syntactic unit, hence, a sequence (possibly, a unit sequence) of syntactic base forms (phonological words in the case of spoken idiolects). A given syntactic word form may combine with several categorizations within a single paradigm (syncretism); and a single paradigm may have a number of different meanings (polysemy), which leads to the same number of different lexical words (identical in their form components). Both the notion of paradigm and the notion of concept are generalized so as to allow for lexical words also where traditionally one would not speak either of a paradigm or of a lexical meaning.

Given the distinction between syntactic units (including syntactic word forms) and lexical words, two main types of syntactic categories are postulated for the syntactic part of any idiolect system. Type 1 syntactic categories (also called 'syntactic unit categories') are sets of syntactic units of the idiolect system, and include the syntactic constituent categories as well as word form categories like cases, numbers, tenses, and definiteness categories. The type 1 syntactic categories of an idiolect system are given through a classification system (a system of cross- and sub-classifications) on the set of all syntactic units of the idiolect system, called the 'Syntactic Unit Ordering.' Type 2 syntactic categories (also called 'word categories') are sets of lexical words. They include the 'parts of speech' of the idiolect system and their subcategories. The type 2 categories are given by the 'Lexical Word Ordering', a classification system on the set of all lexical words of the idiolect system. Both the Syntactic Unit Ordering and the Lexical Word Ordering are components of the syntactic part of an idiolect system.

Any syntactic unit can be assigned at least one syntactic structure. The syntactic structures of a unit are to jointly represent all formal information (including intonation) that is relevant with respect to the syntactic meanings of the unit. This is achieved by construing the syntactic structures of a syntactic unit as triples consisting of (i) a constituent structure, (ii) a marking structure, and (iii) an intonation structure of the unit. The constituent structure identifies constituents of the unit by associating certain parts of the unit with syntactic constituent categories like Noun form, Verb form, Verb Group etc., and captures the positions of syntactic base forms within the unit. The formal conception of constituent structures developed in IL allows for easy surface treatment of discontinuous constituents (whose proper treatment was a key motivation, in early Generative Grammar, for deep structures) and avoids any restriction to binary branching with its well-known empirical problems. The marking structure contains additional categorial information beyond what is provided by the constituent structure. Each primitive constituent of the syntactic unit, that is, each occurrence of a form of a lexical word in the unit, is assigned a 'marking': a set of pairs each consisting of two sets of categories. The first set contains syntactic unit categories of which the word form itself is an element; more specifically, the set is identical with a categorization the word form has in the paradigm of a lexical word to which the word form belongs; if the word form has several categorizations in the paradigm, then all these categorizations appear as first components of pairs in the marking of the primitive constituent, thus, the marking has several elements. The second set contains word categories (in particular, government categories) characterizing the lexical word itself. Finally, the intonation structure is a sequence of modified intonation structures of the syntactic base forms occurring in the syntactic unit. The syntactic intonation structure is crucial for syntactic accents and for the distinction of sentence types (as far as this is based on intonation patterns).

Traditional grammatical relations such as subject, object, attribute, etc. are reconstructed in Integrational Syntax as functions ('grammatical functions') taking 'syntactic quadruples' as their arguments. Each quadruple consists of (i) a syntactic unit (or concatenation of units) of an idiolect system, (ii) a syntactic structure the unit or concatenation has in the system, (iii) an assignment of lexical meanings to the primitive constituents contained in the unit given the structure and the system (called a 'lexical interpretation'), and (iv) the system itself. The values of such grammatical functions are two-(or more)-place relations among constituents of the syntactic unit. (Grammatical functions are only one type of 'constituent functions,' which also include 'scope functions' like negation and qualification, and 'phoric functions' like antecedent; and there are other types of syntactic functions besides the constituent functions.) Syntactic functions play a central role, via their semantic content, in the composition process by which syntactic meanings of a syntactic unit are constructed from the lexical meanings of its primitive constituents. Incorporating features of Valency Grammar, Integrational Syntax construes subject and object functions as derived from more basic complement functions that simultaneously cover all complements of a single verbal nucleus; it generalizes the notion of valency to arbitrary lexical words, excluding purely auxiliary words.

This reconstruction of traditional conceptions, which distinguishes between (universal) syntactic functions on the one hand and their values for individual syntactic quadruples on the other, again allows to formulate general definitions for the names of syntactic functions in the Integrational Theory of Language and to identify their occurrences in the syntactic units of specific idiolect systems by statements in a grammar. Such identification, relative to the syntactic structure and lexical interpretation contained in a given syntactic quadruple, typically depends on the marking structure more than on other components of the syntactic structure, or the lexical interpretation. In particular, government categories, given through classifications in the Lexical Word Ordering and contained in the marking structure, are crucial to identifying the values of the complement functions relative to the syntactic quadruple. Type 1 categories, contained in the marking structure, may also play a role in the identification of syntactic function values. For example, the identification of subject constituents as opposed to object constituents may depend on case categories (cf. German Der Kellner [NOM] mochte sie. 'The waiter liked her.' vs. Den Kellner [ACC] mochte sie. 'The waiter she liked.').

Integrational Morphology, concerned with the analysis of phonological words (and other medial types of syntactic base forms) into meaningful parts, is largely analogous to Integrational Syntax. The morphological entities postulated for any idiolect system are morphological base forms, units, paradigms, categories, structures, and functions as well as lexemes. Morphological base forms (morphs) are entities of the same ontological type as syntactic base forms, structured phonological sound sequences in the case of a spoken idiolect; morphological units are sequences of morphological base forms; and 'lexemes' are conceived as ordered pairs consisting of a morphological paradigm and a concept that is a meaning of the paradigm, similarly to the lexical words in syntax. For any syntactic base form there is a 'morphological analysis': a pair consisting of a morphological unit and a morphological structure of the unit. A morphological unit that is the first component in an analysis of a syntactic base form is a 'morphological word.' A morphological structure of a morphological unit is a triple consisting of a morphological constituent structure, marking structure, and intonation structure. Two main types of morphological categories are assumed. Type 1 morphological categories (also called 'morphological unit categories'), given through the 'Morphological Unit Ordering' of an idiolect system, are sets of morphological units; they include morphological constituent categories, maximally, Stem form, Affix form, and Stem Group, as well as possible subcategories of Stem form and Affix form. Cross-linguistically, there must be stem forms in the idiolect systems of any language whereas the categories Affix form and Stem Group need not occur. Type 2 morphological categories ('lexeme categories') are sets of lexemes and are given through the 'Lexeme Ordering' of the idiolect system. They include the top-level lexeme categories Stem and Affix (comparable to the parts of speech in syntax) and their subcategories. Morphological functions (e.g., morphological complement, modifier, and nucleus) are comparable to grammatical functions in syntax in taking 'morphological quadruples' as their arguments and assigning relations among morphological constituents as values. They figure, via their semantic content, in morphosemantic meaning composition.

The lexicon of an idiolect system is construed as a pair consisting of the lexeme lexicon and the word lexicon. The former is the set of all lexemes (hence, the source of the Lexeme Ordering), and the latter is the set of all lexical words (hence, the source of the Lexical Word Ordering), of the idiolect system.

=== Integrational semantics ===
Integrational Semantics treats lexical meanings (i.e., meanings of morphological or syntactic paradigms and their forms) as entities entirely different from syntactic meanings (meanings of simple or complex syntactic constituents obtained through syntactic meaning composition). Consequently, meaning composition, too, is construed differently for lexical and for syntactic meanings. Integrational Lexical Semantics (with Integrational Morphosemantics and Integrational Word Semantics as its parts) combines the psychological and the realist traditions in semantics. Lexical meanings are construed as concepts in a psychological sense: an n-place concept (with n > 0) is the property of being a (human) perception or conception in whose content a certain non-empty set of n-place attributes of real-world entities occurs as a subset. The set of attributes is called the (n-place) intension of the concept, and the set of real-world entities that have all attributes is called its (n-place) extension. The extension but not the intension may be empty. In the case of a 1-place concept, the attributes in the intension are properties, and the extension is a set of individual real-world objects. If n > 1, the attributes are n-place intensional relations between real-world entities, and the extension is the set of n-tuples of real-world entities among which the n-place relations in the intension hold. Such 'relational concepts' typically occur as lexical meanings of verbs and adpositions (prepositions, etc.) but also of other kinds of relational words. The only concept for which the notions of intension and extension are not defined is the (0-place) 'empty concept,' occurring as the meaning component of lexical words such as auxiliaries and modal particles, and of all affixes, that is, of linguistic entities whose contribution to meaning composition is not based on lexical meanings. Given the notion of empty concept, the IL conception of concepts is both flexible and powerful enough to assign meanings to lexical words of any kind.

A conception is a mental state, and a perception a mental event, located in the brain of an individual. By identifying concepts not with such mental entities but with (extra-mental) properties of mental entities, Integrational Lexical Semantics can account for the potential intersubjectivity of concepts, a problem that any psychological meaning conception must face: while perceptions and conceptions are tied to an individual, a concept may well be a property shared by perceptions or conceptions located in different individuals.

Lexical meaning composition is based on morphosemantic composition functions whose arguments are (n-tuples of) concepts and whose values are again concepts. Such semantic functions occur in the semantic content of morphological functions such as morphological complement, modifier, and nucleus, and operate on the basis of (morphological or semantic) application conditions.

In Integrational Sentence Semantics, sentence meanings are construed as intensional relations between potential utterances and potential speakers. For any syntactic unit that has a sentence meaning, the meanings of the unit jointly represent a necessary condition for successful utterances of the unit. Each (simple) sentence meaning consists of at least (i) a referential part: a set containing exactly one 'referential meaning' for each referential expression of the syntactic unit; (ii) a propositional part: a pair consisting of a directive part (determining a speech act type) and a proposition; and (iii) a propositional background, consisting of what the speaker co-expresses with the proposition. The referential part and the propositional background of a sentence meaning may be empty.

Syntactic meaning composition is based on semantic composition functions associated with (i) the syntactic functions in an idiolect system, by the 'syntactic function interpretation,' (ii) with syntactic categories like tense or definiteness categories, by the 'syntactic category interpretation' (both are components of the sentence-semantic part of the idiolect system). Syntactic meaning composition starts from the lexical meanings of the primitive constituents in a syntactic quadruple: 'basic syntactic meanings' are pairs of a concept, assigned to a primitive constituent by the lexical interpretation, and a 'contextual embedding' of the concept that involves potential speakers and utterances. Next, basic syntactic meanings are transformed into 'intermediate syntactic meanings' for non-primitive constituents by means of syntactic-semantic composition functions that are associated in the idiolect system with syntactic functions such as complement and modifier. Finally, the intermediate (and, possibly, basic) meanings are further processed by semantic functions that are associated with the syntactic nucleus function, so as to yield 'complete syntactic meanings,' which are either referential meanings or sentence meanings.

It appears that Integrational Sentence Semantics combines the meaning-as-use tradition in seman- tics (relating sentence meanings to speakers and utterances) with features of the psychological tradition (lexical meanings as concepts in a psychological sense, speaker attitudes as essential to sentence meanings) and with features of the realist tradition (e.g., extra-mental status of lexical and of syntactic meanings, the compositionality principle for complex meanings).
