= Richard Loving (artist) =

American visual artist (1924–2021)

- Born: January 27, 1924; Vienna, Austria
- Died: March 27, 2021 (aged 97); Oak Park, Illinois, United States
- Education: Art Students League, The New School for Social Research, Bard College
- Known for: Painting, Drawing, enamel art
- Awards: National Endowment for the Arts
- Website: Richard Loving

Richard Loving, Water Connections, oil on canvas, 42" x 84", 1982.

Richard Loving (1924–2021) was an American artist and educator, primarily based in Chicago, Illinois. He gained recognition in the 1980s as a member of the "Allusive Abstractionists," an informal group of Chicago painters, whose individual forms of organic abstraction embraced evocative imagery and metaphor, counter to the dominant minimalist mode. He is most known for paintings that critics describe as metaphysical and visionary, which move fluidly between abstraction and representation, personalized symbolism taking organic and geometric forms, and chaos and order. They are often characterized by bright patterns of dotted lines and dashes, enigmatic spatial fields, and an illuminated quality. In 2010, critic James Yood wrote that Loving's work "mull[ed] over the possibilities of pattern and representation, of narrative and allegory" to attain a kind of wisdom, transcendence and acknowledgement of universals, "seeking understanding of self within the poetics of the physical world."

Loving's art has been exhibited at the Art Institute of Chicago, Museum of Contemporary Crafts in New York, Block Museum of Art, Hyde Park Art Center and Brauer Museum of Art. His work belongs to the public collections of the Art Institute of Chicago, Museum of Contemporary Art, Chicago, and Smart Museum of Art, among others.

== Life and career ==
Richard Maris Loving was born in Vienna, Austria in 1924. His parents, Pierre and Faith Loving, were American writers who lived in Europe and socialized in 1920s artistic circles. After his family moved to New York City in 1929, Loving studied art at Bard College, The New School for Social Research and the Art Students League in the latter 1940s, interrupted by a stint in the army. In 1945, he married Frances Brando, a fellow artist, and later, naturalist and teacher, who was the sister of actors Marlon Brando and Jocelyn Brando. They lived in Hell's Kitchen in the late-1940s, where Frances introduced Loving to family friend Wally Cox, then a silversmith with a jewelry shop and an aspiring comedic actor. Loving learned the craft of enameling from Cox, which he supplemented by studying Limoges enamels at city museums; as Cox's entertainment career advanced, he turned over management of his shop to Loving.

In 1953, the Lovings left Manhattan for the Brando family's farm, Pennypoke, near Mundelein, Illinois. Loving converted the property's barn and out-buildings into a family-operated jewelry workshop and art studio, including a large kiln that he built in order to produce large-scale enamel artworks. During that time, Loving exhibited at the Bloomington Art Association (1957) and Lawrence College (1963), and in the exhibition, "Enamels" (Museum of Contemporary Crafts, New York, 1959), developing what art historian Franz Schulze later called " a modest, static local reputation in craft circles."

Richard Loving, Hathor's Gate Falling Right, oil on canvas, 56" x 76", 1977.

By the late 1960s, Loving had largely left the Brando farm, eventually divorcing Frances. He settled in a Chicago loft, which spurred a significant shift in his art toward drawing and painting, and gradually, abstraction. Schulze cites a 1969 Kovler Gallery exhibition as his "first important solo show" in this new phase; Loving also exhibited at Galerie le Chat Bernard (1973), N.A.M.E. Gallery (1977), the St. Paul Art Center ("Drawings, U.S.A." exhibit, 1968) and Art Institute of Chicago (1969 "Chicago and Vicinity Show"). He received steadily increasing local and national recognition during the 1970s and 1980s, exhibiting at Roy Boyd Gallery (Chicago and Los Angeles) from 1983 to 1996 and in a ten-year survey at the State of Illinois Art Gallery in 1990. He was also selected to exhibit in the traveling shows "Abstract, Symbol, Image" (Hyde Park Art Center, 1984), "Chicago: Some Other Traditions" (Madison Art Center, 1984) and "American Abstraction/Four Currents" (Louis K. Meisel Gallery, New York, 1985).

In his later career, Loving had featured exhibitions at Printworks Gallery (1998, 2003), Jan Cicero Gallery, (2000), the Brauer Museum of Art (2010) and Hyde Park Art Center (2014), and thirty-year reviews at the Evanston Art Center and Art Center in Highland Park (both 2007). Loving died on March 27, 2021, at age 97, in Oak Park, Illinois.

== Work and reception ==
In Arts Magazine, critic Mary Mathews Gedo characterized Loving as a "virtually self-taught … maverick artist" and late bloomer, who worked representationally during Abstract Expressionism's heyday, retreated from the Manhattan zeitgeist to the country to explore the medieval art of enameling, and in Chicago, turned to abstraction at the height of city's Imagism movement, reaching his mature style and height of productivity and recognition in his upper fifties. Chicago Tribune critic Alan Artner described Loving's work as evolving from early figuration and representation, to a semi-abstract symbolic discourse from the 1970s to 1990s, to more representational, "spiritually transcendent" pictures suggesting cosmic subjects and landscapes in the 2000s.

=== Early work ===
Loving's enamel works on copper often depicted stylized figures set in semi-abstract, primordial landscapes seemingly in flux (e.g., Untitled, 1959). They employ painterly gesture influenced by Abstract Expressionism and bright colors sometimes flecked with gold and silver; the work differs from traditional enameling in its modernist resistance to the medium's inherent decorativeness, achieved through the incorporation of disparate materials such as rough wood, multi-panel formats and large scale. Loving largely discontinued enameling by the end of the 1960s, but writers cite its influence in his later work's use of color, transparency, and geometric divisions within canvasses.

Loving's new direction was heralded in a 1969 Kovler Gallery show, in which he presented large shaped drawings of fantastical machine forms described as faintly evocative of the Cubist work of Francis Picabia. The drawings led him back to oil painting, yielding a more abstract, subsequent series depicting webs of hard-edged geometric forms disappearing into densely marked backgrounds.

=== Mature work ===
After moving to Chicago, Loving's work began what Franz Schulze called its "slow ascent toward more ambitious things"— a personal style of lyrical abstraction that by the mid-1970s made him "a figure of recognizable substance on the Chicago art scene." He arrived at his mature style during a period when he belonged to the "Allusive Abstractionists," a self-named group of artists that included Miyoko Ito, William Conger and Frank Piatek. They were united by their mutual interest in a form of organic abstraction that—counter to minimalist hard-edged abstraction—embraced real-world referentiality, evocative imagery, metaphor, subjectivity and old master techniques, while exploring contemporary stylistic problems.

Richard Loving, Catalysis, oil on canvas, 54" x 86", 1991.

Loving's paintings of this era employed bright patterns of varied, restless line—rippling strokes, dotted lines and dashes he described as "obsessional mark-making"— superimposed on richly colored, mottled color fields (e.g., Hathor's Gate Falling Right, 1977). In these works, the mark served as his central technique, an indicator of time, human intention and energy, as well as a source of rhythm in his compositions. Loving populated his canvasses with free-form, flat diagrammatic shapes (often with bold, electric outlines) and interior borders or portals, creating ambiguous, theatrical spaces that emphasized a contrast between diffuseness and definition (e.g., Water Connections, 1982). Critic Alan Artner has related this work to Georges Seurat's, in terms of its technique and illusion of inner light, while also suggesting that it anticipated the Pattern and Decoration movement and later trends in abstraction evoking aerial, map-like associations.

After an early-1980s trip in which Loving encountered Byzantine mosaics and frescoes, he began incorporating discrete, personalized symbols alluding to sexuality (lips, flowers, fountains, seeds, fireworks) and elemental or microcosmic life (flames, molecules, water, crystals) in his work (e.g., Amorosa Tropicalia, 1983; La Source, 1986; Catalysis, 1991; or Parabola, 1993). Critics such as Charlotte Moser wrote that these works demonstrated a romantic impulse to fix the physical properties of ephemeral sensory impressions, creating a precarious balancing act between flux and order, physics and alchemy. Franz Schulze wrote that the symbols Introduced a surrealist quality into the work, transforming it from "a cool formalism to an ideographic fantasy, no less cool, but filled with mystery and dark ambiguities."

=== Later work ===
Richard Loving, In a Budding Grove, oil on canvas, 50" x 62", 2008.

Loving's later work incorporates more representational imagery, beginning with a 1998 drawing series, "Dissections," and continuing through his paintings of the 2000s, which metaphorically explore visionary and humanist subjects such as fecundity, growth and the irrepressibility of life through brilliantly colored floral and landscape imagery. Initially, these works employed spare, simplified forms such as light fountains and comets (e.g., Sympathetic Outpouring, 2002), painted with his characteristic dashes and sometimes bracketed by otherworldly vertical blazes of light on the sides of the pictures. With paintings such as Efflorescense (2005), however, he began introducing naturalistically rendered flower (and eventually bird, tree and waterfall) forms.

This later work offered an increasingly complex mix of naturalism and enigmatic theatrical spaces that writers say shifted interpretation from literal toward more poetic and mysterious narrative, symbolic and metaphorical frameworks. Paintings such as In a Budding Grove (2008) or Fall and Flowers (2009) combine familiar natural settings with formal devices such as unnatural curtain-like bands of light and glowing, curved horizon lines that seem to enclose the landscapes. James Yood compared them to late medieval altarpieces, whose nuance and iconography suggested "both the physical and metaphysical, the prospect of a dense zone of nature gone wild and also an immersion into the forces—spiritual, chlorophyllic, reproductive, etc.—that in their aggregate comprise the dictates of life."

== Other professional activities ==
In addition to his artmaking, Loving was a professor at the School of the Art Institute of Chicago for more than thirty years until his retirement as Professor Emeritus in 2004; he served for several years as chairman of the Painting and Drawing Department. In 1986, he, Frank Piatek and William Conger started the publication Chicago/Art/Write, a self-distributed publication printed with the support of the school, featuring themselves and other artists discussing ideas, often organized around themes, such as "Regionalism," "Figuration, Representation and Realism" or "Difficult Art."

== Collections and recognition ==
Loving's work belongs to the public art collections of the Art Institute of Chicago, Museum of Contemporary Art, Chicago, Block Museum of Art, Illinois State Museum, Joslyn Art Museum, Smart Museum of Art and the State of Illinois, as well to corporate, private and university collections. In 1983, he was awarded a Senior Fellowship Grant from the National Endowment for the Arts.
