= Roy Harris (linguist) =

Roy Harris (24 February 1931 – 9 February 2015) was a British linguist. He was Professor of General Linguistics in the University of Oxford and Honorary Fellow of St Edmund Hall. He also held university teaching posts in Hong Kong (University of Hong Kong), Boston and Paris and visiting fellowships at universities in South Africa and Australia, and at the Indian Institute of Advanced Study.

His books on integrationism, theory of communication, semiology and the history of linguistic thought include The Language Myth, Rethinking Writing, Saussure and his Interpreters and The Necessity of Artspeak. He has also translated an edition of Ferdinand de Saussure's Course in General Linguistics.

He was a founding member of the International Association for the Integrational Study of Language and Communication (IAISLC) and founding editor of the journal Language & Communication.

== Integrationism ==
The main focus of Harris' research was the development of an integrational approach to signs and semiological systems, and hence to all human communication. His approach, called integrationism, involves looking at current educational practice, together with the whole history of linguistic thought from Plato down to the present day, in a perspective that differs radically from traditional views. Integrationism has important implications for our understanding of interpersonal relations, as well as of modern society and its communicational resources, including the entire range of arts and sciences.

Expanding on the sign study of Ferdinand de Saussure and the semiotics theory of Charles Sanders Peirce, integration accounts for indeterminate processes of sign interaction as they occur through human conductants. A Saussurean conception of signs offers a perspective that separates speakers' minds from environments; language occurs as codes which are unconsciously stored and deployed. Semiotics sees the sign processes of the mind as part of the environment. It encompasses a study of sign systems and autopoietic processes in nature as they occur, with or without conscious human participation. Integration focuses on human communication as inseparable from environments but also considers the individual self and human agency as important to the process of creating, recreating and integrating signs along with the ever-changing signs of nature. The theory takes the human perspective as an appropriate starting place for understanding semiological phenomena.

In addition to Ferdinand de Saussure and the semiotician Charles Sanders Peirce, Harris and his descendant thinkers credit the philosopher G. E. Moore, Wittgenstein's Philosophical Investigations, J. L. Austin, Gilbert Ryle and the "ordinary language" movement as influencing the development of integrational linguistics . The linguist and anthropologist J. R. Firth and Bronisław Malinowski and their "context of situation" are also pertinent reference points as is the "ethnomethodology" associated with Harold Garfinkel.

== Books ==
- Synonymy and Linguistic Analysis, 1973, Oxford, Blackwell.
- The Language-Makers, 1980, London, Duckworth.
- The Language Myth, 1981, London, Duckworth.
- F. de Saussure: Course in General Linguistics, 1983, London, Duckworth.
- The Origin of Writing, 1986, London, Duckworth.
- Reading Saussure, 1987, London, Duckworth.
- The Language Machine, 1987, London, Duckworth.
- Language, Saussure and Wittgenstein, 1988, London, Routledge.
- La Sémiologie de l'écriture, 1994, Paris, CNRS.
- Signs of Writing, 1996, London, Routledge.
- The Language Connection, 1996, Bristol, Thoemmes.
- Signs, Language and Communication, 1996, London, Routledge.
- Introduction to Integrational Linguistics, 1998, Oxford, Pergamon.
- Rethinking Writing, 2000, London, Athlone.
- Saussure and his Interpreters, 2001, Edinburgh, Edinburgh UP.
- The Necessity of Artspeak, 2003, London, Continuum. ISBN 9780826460684
- The Linguistics of History, 2004, Edinburgh, Edinburgh UP.
- The Semantics of Science, 2005, London, Continuum.
- Integrationist Notes and Papers 2003–2005, 2006, Crediton, Tree Tongue.
- Mindboggling, 2008, Luton, The Pantaneto Press.
- Rationality and the Literate Mind, 2009, London, Taylor & Francis.
- After Epistemology, 2009, Gamlingay, Bright Pen.
- The Great Debate About Art, 2010, Prickly Paradigm Press.
- Integrationist Notes and Papers 2009–2011, 2011, Gamlingay, Bright Pen.
- Integrationist Notes and Papers 2012, 2012, Gamlingay, Bright Pen.
- Integrating Reality, 2012, Gamlingay, Authors Online Ltd.
- Language and Intelligence, 2013, Gamlingay, Authors Online Ltd.
