= Richard Wetzel =

American painter

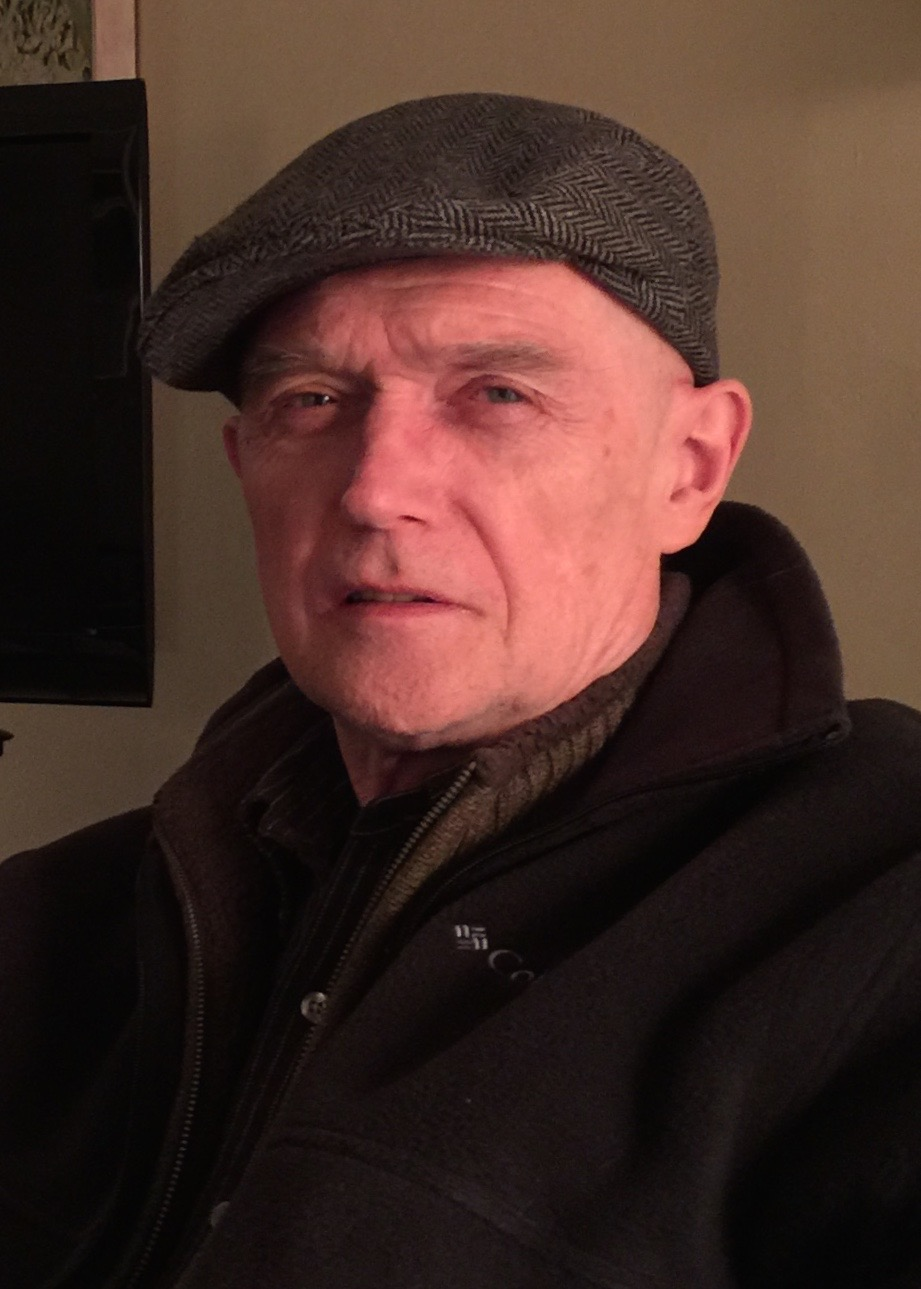
- Wetzel in 2014
- Born: October 23, 1943 (age 82); Elmhurst, Illinois, U.S.
- Education: School of the Art Institute of Chicago (BFA); Northern Illinois University (MA)
- Spouse: Janice Anderson

Richard Wetzel (born October 23, 1943) is an American artist. He is best known for his oil paintings but also has exhibited collages and sculpture. In 1969 and 1970, Wetzel exhibited with the Chicago Imagists, a grouping of Chicago artists who were ascendant in the late 1960s and early 1970s.

== Biography ==
Born in Elmhurst, Illinois, Wetzel was the second of three boys (with brothers David and Douglas). Both Wetzel's parents were artists. Wetzel's father, Wilbert, was a photoengraver. His mother, Elfreda, was a commercial artist. The family eventually settled in Arlington Heights, Illinois.

Wetzel's interest in art developed at an early age, but he was also a three-time gymnastics individual medalist (pommel horse) on the Arlington High School (AHS) team that won two successive Illinois State Gymnastics Championships: 1958–59 and 1959–60.

At age 17, two significant events influenced Wetzel's future direction. The first was the arrival of artist James F. Walker as an art teacher at Arlington High School. Walker arrived from his teaching position at the School of the Art Institute of Chicago (SAIC) during Wetzel's senior year, 1960–61. Walker was an artist who created mixed-media surrealist images. The second event was a trip to New York City to view an exhibition of the works of Max Ernst at the Museum of Modern Art. The influence of these two artists would shape Wetzel's vision for decades to come.

After graduation, Wetzel enrolled in SAIC in fall 1961, where he studied with Vera Berdich, Whitney Halstead, Thomas Kapsalis, and Sonia Sheridan. While at SAIC, Wetzel met classmate and fellow artist Janice Anderson. They married after Janice's graduation in 1965.

Prior to his marriage, Wetzel moved to Chicago's Old Town, a neighborhood known for the arts, its bars and nightlife, and 1960s hippie counterculture. In 1962, Wetzel opened the Sedgwick Street Gallery with AHS classmate Dennis Rice on North Avenue at the Sedgwick L Stop. The gallery was located up the street from the Mole Hole, home of the counterculture newspaper the Chicago Seed, and walking distance from Cabrini Green, a low-income, high-rise complex known for high poverty and crime. At the gallery, Wetzel and Rice exhibited the works of Karl Wirsum, Barry Malloy, Luis Ortiz, William Nichols, Bill Arsenault, Ed Paschke, and Wetzel's mentor, James F. Walker, as well as his own work.

In 1968, Wetzel graduated with honors from SAIC with a BFA. The Institute awarded him a Foreign Travelling Fellowship, which he would later use to travel and study abroad. After graduating from SAIC, he continued his studies at Northern Illinois University, earning an MA in 1969. In the fall of 1970, Richard and his wife, Janice, traveled throughout Europe for eight months on his fellowship, studying art and architecture. After returning to Chicago, they both assumed teaching positions in city and suburban art departments, where they continued teaching until retirement, Janice in the Chicago Public Schools, and Richard in Niles Township High Schools. They lived, worked, and traveled together until Janice's death in 2014.

== The Chicago Imagists ==
The Chicago Imagists were a group of graduates and students of the School of the Art Institute of Chicago, all in their 20s, who came to be regarded in the art world as “the Chicago vanguard.” Their work was exhibited at the Hyde Park Art Center (HPAC) in nine exhibitions between 1966 and 1972. The nine shows at HPAC were aligned into three groups: The Hairy Who, The Nonplussed Some, and The False Image. According to Robin Dluzen, the Imagists were “mainly white but with an unusually large percentage of female members … 7 women amongst 11 men …”

These events were organized by Don Baum, exhibitions director at HPAC, and a participant in one of the nine shows. Baum would later organize two exhibitions for the Museum of Contemporary Art Chicago. The first of these, Don Baum Says Chicago Needs Famous Artists, included works by Wetzel. The second show, Made in Chicago, did not. Made in Chicago traveled on to the São Paulo Bienal in Brazil and also to the Smithsonian Museum in Washington.

James Yood offered a concise definition of the Imagist aesthetic:

… funky and irreverent subject matter (often with sexual and/or violent overtones, with imaginative fantasies dealing with the figure under extreme physical or psychological stress), a predilection for narrative themes drawn from vernacular sources, a decided openness to influences from self-taught artists and from sources outside the mainstream of Western art history, a taste for garish and obsessively busy small-scale compositions driven by a concern for symmetry and a linear approach to the figure, surrealistic whimsy and ironic and caustic humor undercutting the “serious” status of the art object, high-keyed color, scrupulous and fastidious craftspersonship [sic] tending toward the suppression of evidence of the experiential residue of the artist's hand, and iconic independence and idiosyncratic mannerism of the most manic sort.

Franz Schultze in ARTNews 1971 described a cliquishness in the various groups.

They cluster in small groups and—rather like the secret kids' clubs that flourished in the days of radio serials and the Sunday funnies—they even assume corporate names, like The Hairy Who ([Jim] Nutt, [Gladys] Nilsson, [Karl] Wirsum, Suellen Rocca, Art Green, James Falconer), The Nonplussed Some ([Ed] Flood, [Ed] Paschke, Sara Canright, Richard Wetzel, Don Baum), the False Image (Roger Brown, Phil Hanson, Christina Ramberg, Eleanor Dube).

In fact, as Schultze noted in 1969, Imagist artist Robert Guinan participated in the Nonplussed Some show but was later replaced by Don Baum in Nonplussed Some Some More. Shultze's omission of Guinan in 1971 points to a question of who is in the Imagist roster.

Alan Artner, Chicago Tribune art critic, commented on the 2000 Imagist show at the Chicago Cultural Center:

Some artists in “Jumpin' Backflash”—Robert Guinan, Richard Wetzel—didn't fit the developing definitions of the style and were passed by almost from the beginning … … That few of the painters beyond Ed Paschke and Jim Nutt ever took their art further perhaps says something about Imagism and arrested development.

Peter Schjeldahl in Art in America observed that from the first HPAC exhibition in 1966 the alignments among the artists morphed almost continually.

The groups miscegenated briskly in a series of Hyde Park shows that, with themes and costumes, were also theatrical events: “Marriage Chicago Style,” for instance, solemnized the joining of members of the Who and the Some, plus Barbara Rossi.

James Yood in 2000 observed, “Many of these artists did not feel at the time, nor do some admit today, that they are particularly linked to one another …” Wetzel's participation with the Imagists ended in 1970.

Wetzel did show his work in the 2000 group exhibition at the Chicago Cultural Center, Jumpin' Backflash: Original Imagist Artwork, 1966–1969. This exhibit marked the first time that the works of all fifteen artists of the nine HPAC shows were included in one exhibition. Wetzel was quoted in the program notes for Jumpin' Backflash:

… the current exhibit is the first time that ALL the “Imagist” artists have been included, in person or in print … it should present a rare opportunity to read the works instead of the words.

A documentary film about the Imagists was released in 2014, Hairy Who and the Chicago Imagists.

From 1962, Wetzel has exhibited his work in both solo and group exhibitions. Sue Taylor in the Chicago Sun-Times observed in 1985 that

Like others associated with [The Chicago Imagists], now internationally renowned, Wetzel has intensified the individual aspects of his style in the 15 years since the inception of Imagism.

Wetzel continues to live in Chicago, where he works in collaboration with DAKOtravail.

== From the critics ==
Whitney Halstead, Artforum, 1968

The juxtapositions typical of collage are blended to achieve a lyrical (and here, dreamlike) mood in Richard Wetzel's transfer images on glass. Black Eyed Susan's Circle typifies his achievement in synthesizing disparate elements in a quiet, understated tone.

Franz Schultze, Chicago Daily News, 1968

Wetzel makes dreamy, low-key collages with ectoplasmic faces …

Harold Haydon, Chicago Sun-Times, 1969

… Wetzel's large and ingenious photo collages …

Franz Schultze, Chicago Daily News, 1969

… Wetzel's complicated surrealist symbolism …

Harold Haydon, Chicago Sun-Times, 1975

With precision and subtlety, [Wetzel] draws organic and vegetable forms at about the scale of cabbages and squashes, while emphasizing the prehensile aspect of vegetation. Tendrils and claws reach out to grapple in these imagined encounters in the land of chlorophyll. Just as vegetable claws resemble beatle [sic] and crab pincers in Wetzel's drawings, so flying seeds acquire monarch-butterfly and other insect wings. These drawings transmit the essence of a quiet, desperate struggle from existence.

Harold Haydon, Chicago Sun-Times, 1981

Rapacious flowers and other vegetation, painted large—as if from an insect's point of view—loom large against dark pastoral landscapes in Richard D. Wetzel's exhibition …

In Wetzel's world, precisely painted plants, fierce in fang and claw, can be as prosaic as green beans or as fantastic as root systems. Their victims usually are eggs, whose fate is to be seized and devoured. Only one escapes, in the painting titled “Deliverance,” borne aloft by a monarch butterfly and by its coloration, obviously an egg of the monarch clan.

If all this imagery is taken as a paradigm of earthly existence, Wetzel's view must be quite on the mark.

Jeff Abell, New Art Examiner, 1984

The paintings make use of intensely bright colors, most often to delineate shapes against the generally darker background colors. For example, a strange claw-like shape is outlined in a very hot yellow-orange against a purple background, so that the figure glows against its ground.

Sue Taylor, Chicago Sun-Times, 1985

… the brilliant radiating colors and mysterious, iconic images that have long distinguished Wetzel's art are still his major concerns. Each image is set against a monochromatic background of the deepest blue, purple or green, which may be read as an infinite spatial recession, indicative of the vague realm of imagination.

Sue Taylor, Chicago Sun-Times, 1985

What is unique about his current paintings is their powerfully emotive quality, for they operate largely on the level of feeling. The forms he uses, for all their rich ambiguity, are direct, simplified, and distilled, and their suggestiveness is of a kind everyone can understand—intuitively …

David McCracken, Chicago Tribune, 1985

… Zaks is showing paintings by Richard Wetzel, work very much in the Chicago School tradition: hard-edged forms at once organic and artificial—they reminded me, oddly, of electron photomicrography—in eerie, strangely erotic colors.

G. Jurek Polanski, Jumpin' Backflash: Original Imagist Artwork, 1966–1969, 2000

There are images which linger long after viewing. A prime example is Death-Breath, a 1966 serigraph on paper among the works by Richard Wetzel. Both in spirit and execution, it implies affinities with such German expressionists as Georg Grosz, but for Wetzel, allied with the “Nonplussed Some,” Vietnam, not Dachau, more likely supplied the inspirational matrix.

== Collections ==
- Art Institute of Chicago
- University of Illinois–Urbana
- Northern Illinois University–Dekalb
- Kemper Art Collection
- Illinois State Museum–Springfield
- Loyola University–Chicago
- Minneapolis Institute of Art

== Solo exhibitions ==
- 1963 Sedgwick Street Gallery, Chicago
- 1973 Barat College, Lake Forest, Illinois
- 1974 Mundelein College, Chicago
- 1974 Kemper Art Collection
- 1974 Oakton College, Morton Grove, Illinois
- 1975 One Illinois Center, Chicago
- 1980 Zaks Gallery, Chicago
- 1983 Zaks Gallery, Chicago
- 1984 One Illinois Center, Chicago
- 1985 Zaks Gallery, Chicago
- 1991 Zaks Gallery, Chicago
- 1993 Zaks Gallery, Chicago
- 1994 Loyola University, Chicago
- 1997 Sonia Zaks Gallery, Chicago
- 2000 Sonia Zaks Gallery, Chicago
- 2004 Sonia Zaks Gallery, Chicago
- 2007 O. K. Harris Works of Art, New York
- 2020 Corbett vs. Dempsey, Chicago
- 2024 Corbett vs. Dempsey, Chicago

== Group exhibitions ==
- 1962 Sixty-Fifth Annual Exhibition by Artists of Chicago and Vicinity. The Art Institute of Chicago, May 4–June 3, 1962.
- 1966 Sixty-Ninth Annual Exhibition by Artists of Chicago and Vicinity. The Art Institute of Chicago, April 1–May 1, 1966.
- 1968 Nonplussed Some. Hyde Park Art Center, Chicago.
- 1969 72nd Annual Exhibition by Artists of Chicago and Vicinity. The Art Institute of Chicago, March 22–April 20, 1969.
- 1969 Nonplussed Some Some More. Hyde Park Art Center, Chicago.
- 1969 Famous Artists “Don Baum Says Chicago Needs Famous Artists.” Museum of Contemporary Art, Chicago.
- 1969 Thirty Works by Thirty Artists to Celebrate the Thirtieth Year of the Hyde Park Art Center, Chicago.
- 1970 New Horizons. North Shore Art League, Chicago.
- 1970 Fourcaste. Hyde Park Art Center, Chicago.
- 1970 USIA American Printmakers Exhibition. Europe and Japan.
- 1972 New Horizons. North Shore Art League, Chicago.
- 1981 33rd Illinois Invitational. Illinois State Museum, Springfield, Summer 1981.
- 1984 Painting and Sculpture Today 1984. Indianapolis Museum of Art, May 1–June 10, 1984.
- 1986 Fetish Art: Obsessive Expressions. Rockford Art Museum, Illinois, March 8–April 20, 1986.
- 1988 Il Bronzetto. Hyde Park Art Center, Chicago.
- 1993 Genius Loci of Old Town. Gallery 1756, Chicago.
- 2000 Jumpin' Back Flash: Original Imagist Art. Chicago Cultural Center.
- 2021 Private Eye: The Imagist Impulse in Chicago Art. Indianapolis Museum of Art at Newfields, May 21–December 5, 2021.

== Awards and honors ==
- School of the Art Institute of Chicago, Foreign Travelling Fellowship, 1968.
- New Horizons Award, North Shore Art League, Chicago, 1972.
- Illinois State Museum Purchase Award, 1981.

== Gallery ==
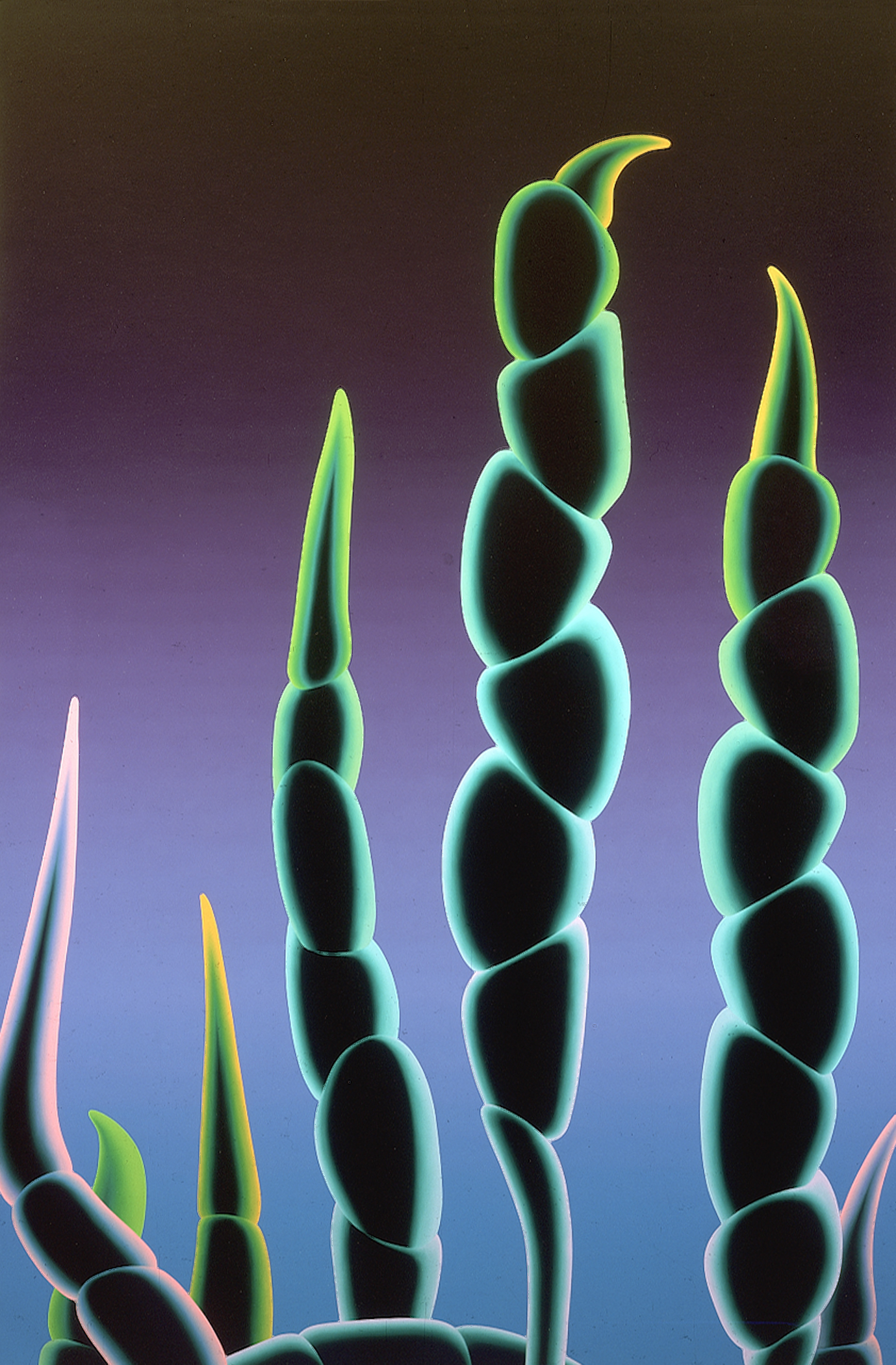
Anakena 1983 (Oil on masonite 72″x48″)

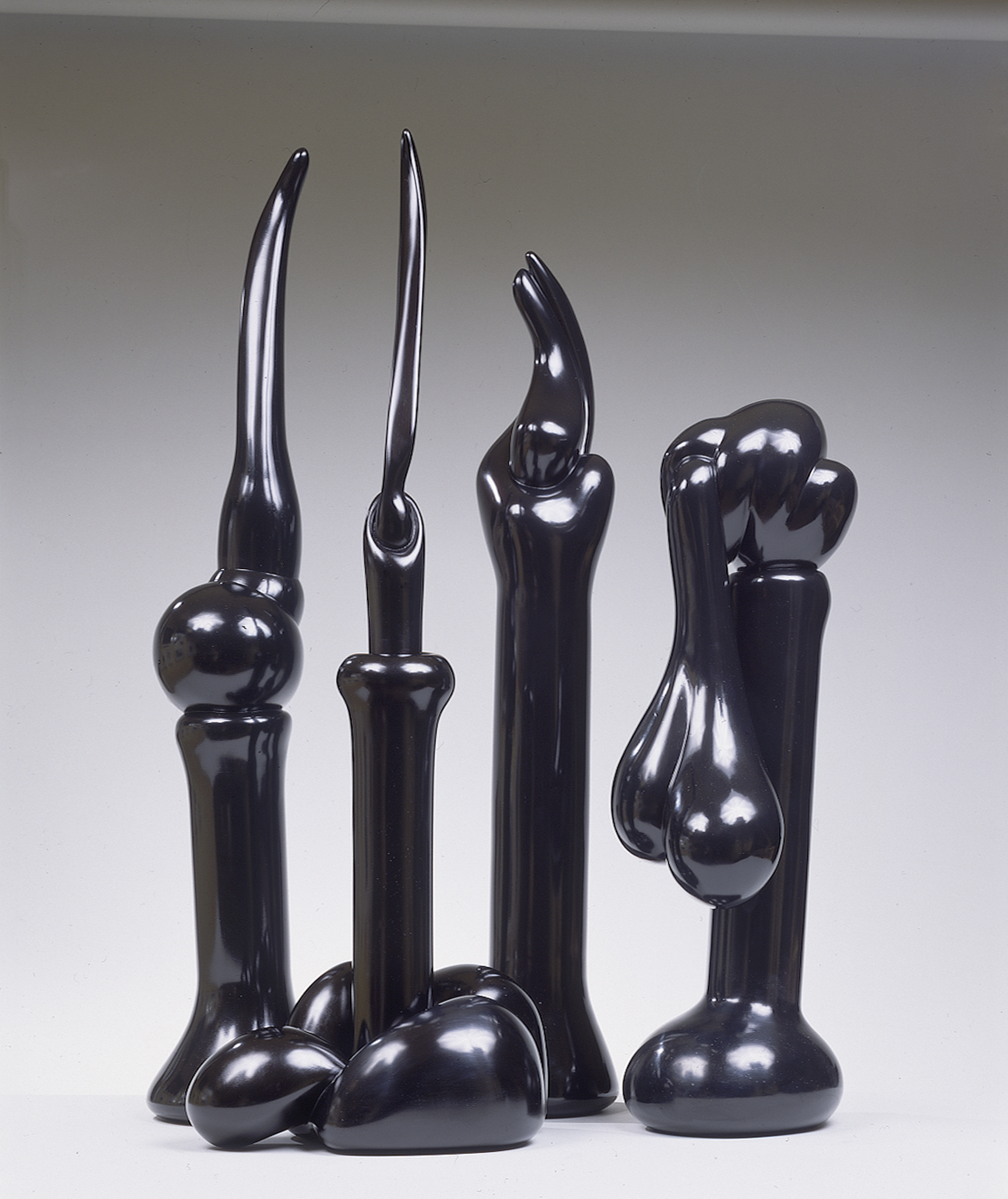
Four Sculptures: Dark Fuse, Trethevy, Sentry, and Territorial Display (Four sculptures in epoxy resin,1990)

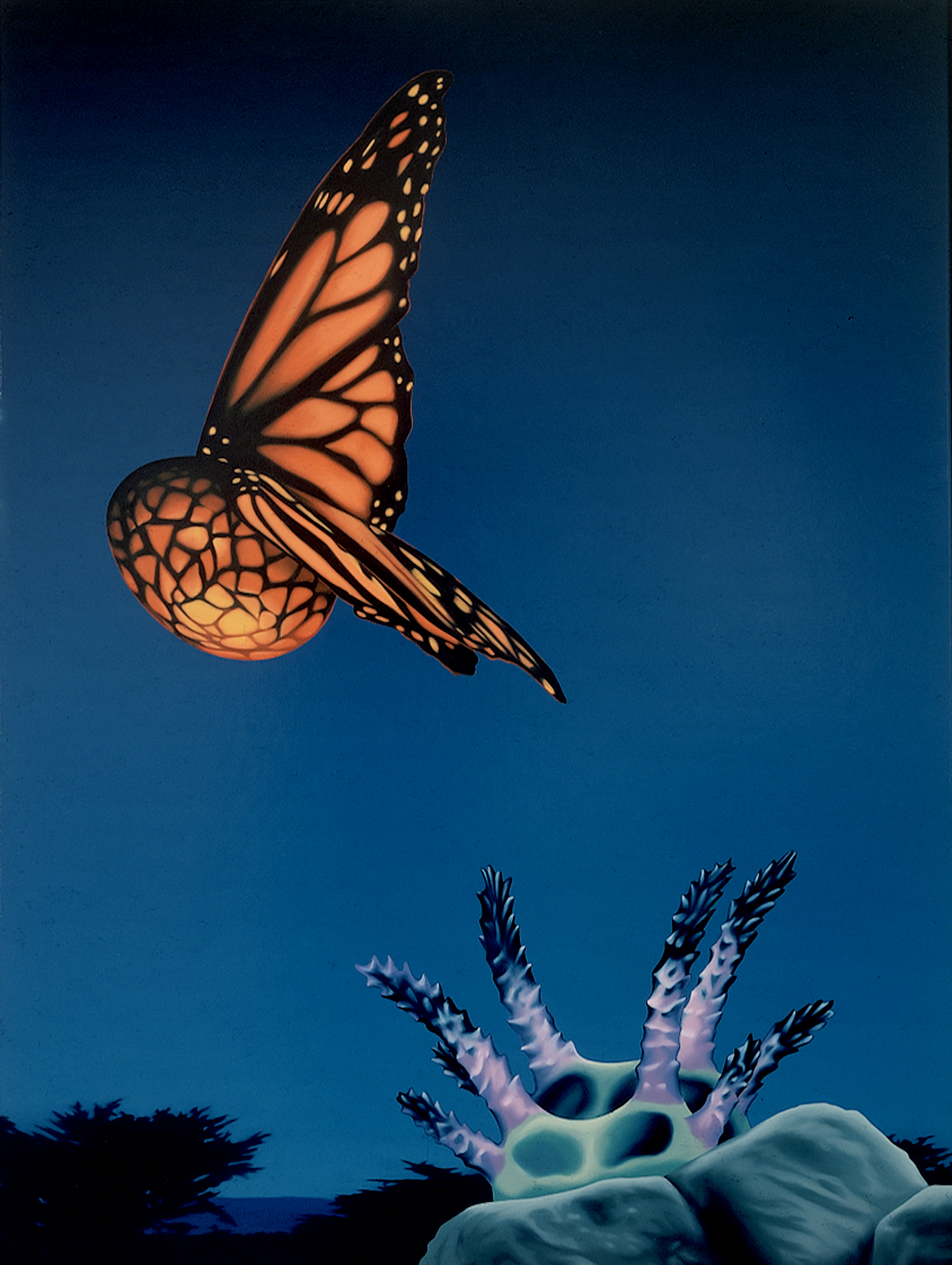
Deliverance 1979 (Oil on masonite 48″x36″)

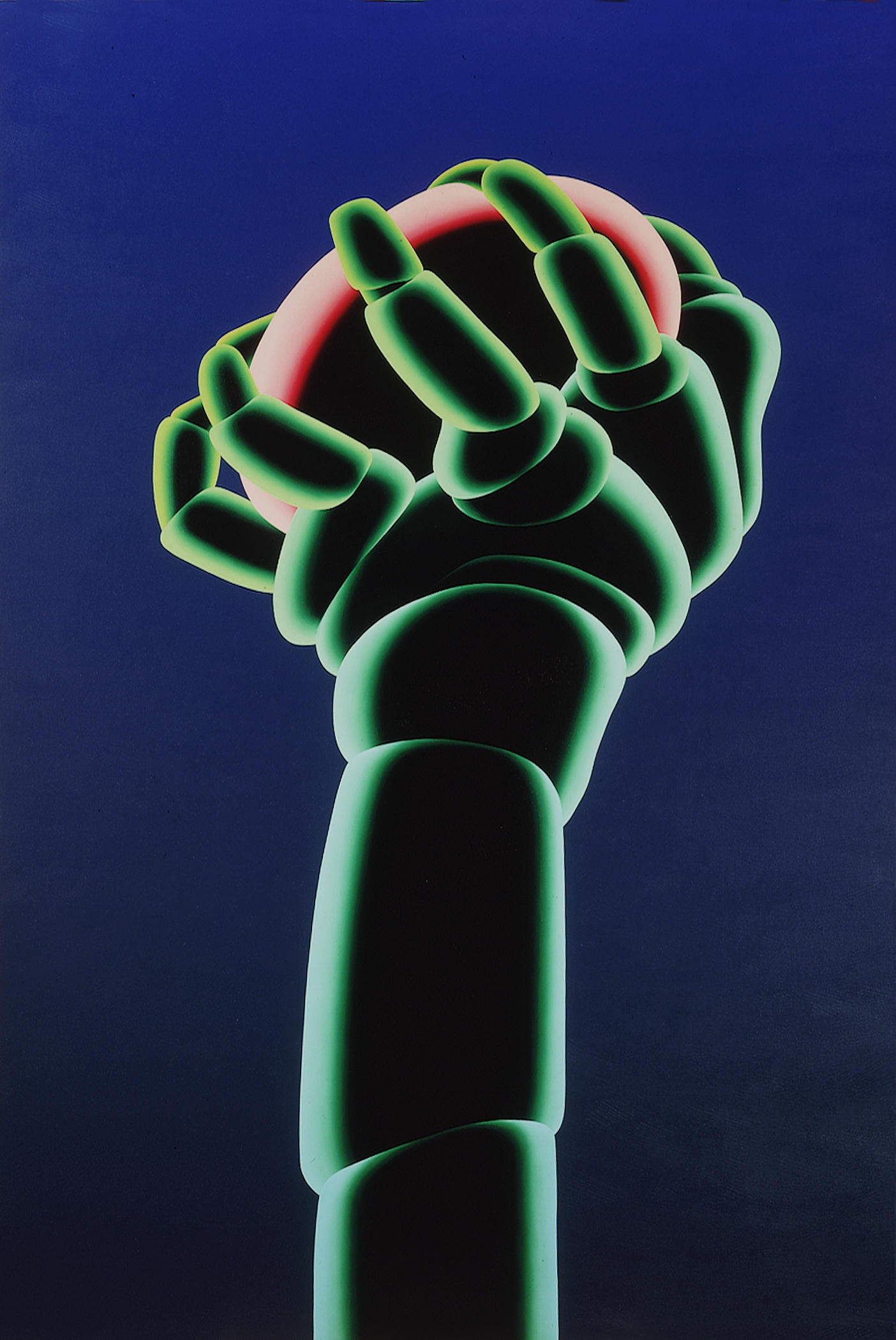
Te Pito O Te Henua (Oil on linen 62″x42″, 1985)

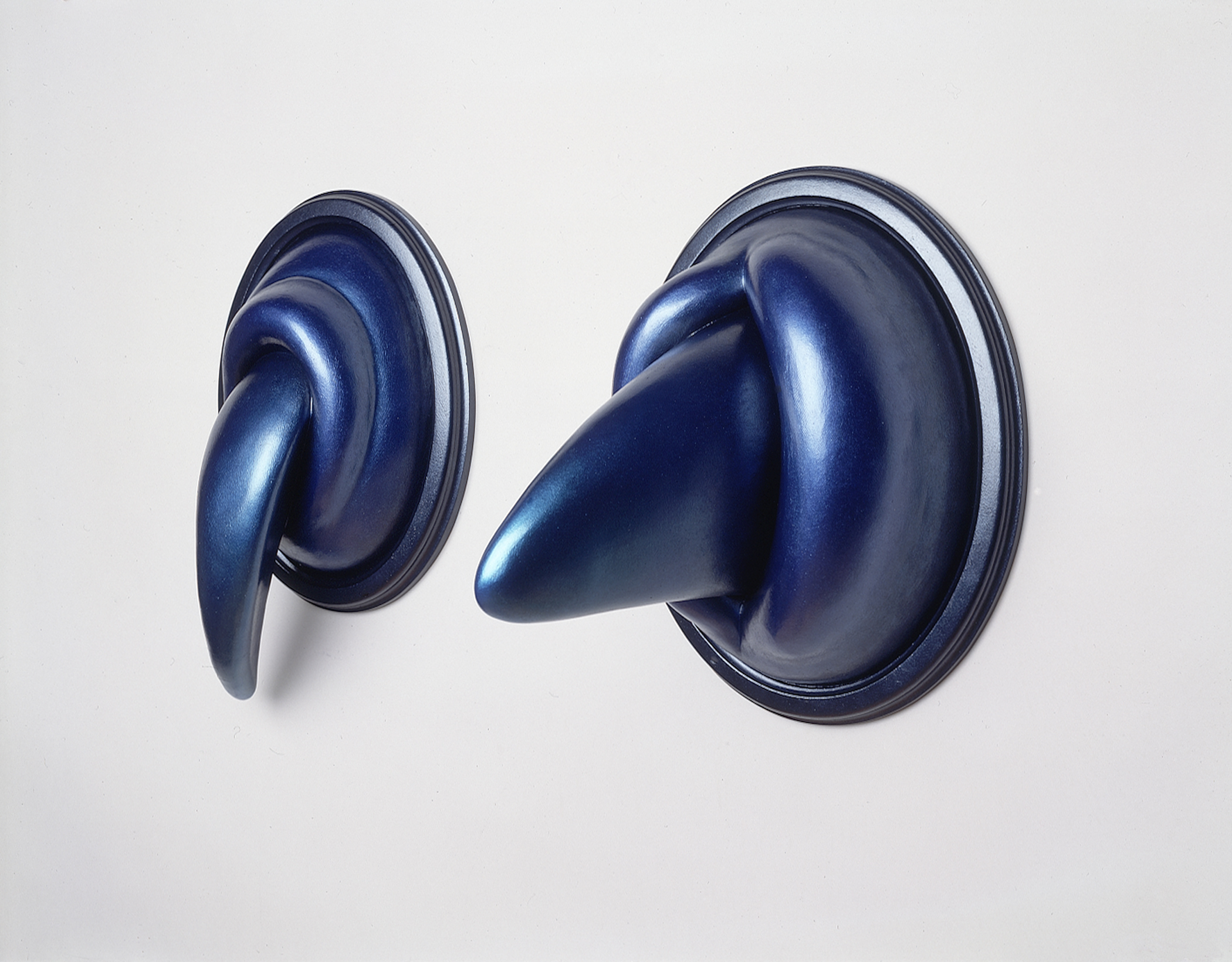
Two Portals in Blue (Acrylic on epoxy resin and wood, 1996)
