= Don Baum =

American curator, artist and educator

- Baum at a Chicago Imagist "Made in Chicago" exhibition opening in São Paulo, 1973
- Born: 1922; Escanaba, Michigan, U.S.
- Died: October 28, 2008 (aged 85–86); Evanston, Illinois, U.S.
- Education: Michigan State University (attended); School of the Art Institute of Chicago (attended); University of Chicago (BA, MA, PhD)
- Style: Chicago Imagists

Don Baum (1922 – October 28, 2008) was an American curator, artist and educator, most known as a key impresario and promoter of the Chicago Imagists, a group of artists that had an enduring impact on American art in the later twentieth century. Described by the Museum of Contemporary Art, Chicago (MCA) as "an indispensable curator of the Chicago school," Baum was known for lively and irreverent exhibitions that offered fresh perspectives combining elements of Surrealism and Pop and that broke down barriers between schooled and untrained, or so-called outsider artists. From 1956 to 1972, Baum was exhibitions director at Chicago's Hyde Park Art Center. It was there, in the 1960s, that he became involved with a group of young artists he exhibited as "Hairy Who" that later expanded to become the Chicago Imagists. That group included Ed Paschke, Jim Nutt, Roger Brown, Gladys Nilsson, and Karl Wirsum. Baum mounted two major shows at the MCA that featured the emerging artists in their first museum exhibitions: "Don Baum Sez: 'Chicago Needs Famous Artists'" (1969) and "Made in Chicago" (1973), which shaped a vision of Chicago's art world as a place of meticulous craftsmanship and vernacular inspiration.

Baum's curatorial and artistic work was widely covered in publications including: Artforum, Art in America, ARTnews, Art Magazine, Time, Newsweek, New Art Examiner, Chicago Tribune, Chicago Sun-Times, Chicago Daily News, and the New York Times. His own art work is part of major public collections, including National Museum of American Art, The Art Institute of Chicago, and the Museum of Contemporary Art, Chicago, among many. In addition to his curatorial work and artistic production, Baum was a longtime educator at several Chicago institutions, notably Roosevelt University (1948–1984).

== Life and career ==
Baum was born Charles Donald Baum in Escanaba, Michigan. He attended Michigan State College before coming to Chicago in the early 1940s to pursue his interest in art, initially at the School of the Art Institute of Chicago and then at the University of Chicago where he studied art history and earned a PhD in 1947. As a young artist, Baum participated in the influential Art Institute of Chicago (AIC) student-led Momentum Exhibits of the late 1940s and early 1950s; his work was also chosen for more than ten of AIC's prestigious "Chicago and Vicinity" surveys, beginning in 1946, and later included in the traveling show "Twenty-Five Chicago Artists" (1963).

In the 1950s, Baum was teaching at Roosevelt University and the Hyde Park Art Center, where he met artist Alice Shaddle. They married in 1955 and had two children. The couple separated in 1970.

Baum was named exhibitions director at Hyde Park Art Center in 1956. It was here that he became increasingly visible in the 1960s and 1970s as a promoter of a figurative "Chicago School" of art that ran counter to the prevailing abstract current of New York City. Critic Franz Schulze would later say, "He became a little empire to himself...not so much an artist as an impresario." During that time, Baum's influence expanded as he served on the board of trustees of the MCA in Chicago (1974-1986) and as chairman of its Exhibitions Committee (1974–79). Throughout this time, Baum continued to develop his own art, which he exhibited extensively. Baum died in Evanston, Illinois, in October 2008 at the age of 86.

== The Hairy Who and Chicago Imagists ==
In 1964, Baum was approached at the Hyde Park Art Center by artists Jim Nutt, Gladys Nilsson and James Falconer about a group exhibit. They put together a show that also included Art Green, Suellen Rocca and Karl Wirsum, titled "Hairy Who" (1966), an off-handed inside joke about local art critic, Harry Bouras. The six artists showed there together twice more (1967 and 1968). The informal group, and Baum, received national attention, with subsequent shows at the San Francisco Art Institute, the School of Visual Arts in New York, and the Corcoran Gallery of Art in Washington, DC. Baum continued to organize notable shows there such as "Nonplussed Some" and "False Image" (1968), and "Marriage, Chicago Style" (1970), with an expanded group of artists.

By the early 1970s, the Hairy Who artists came to be known collectively as the Chicago Imagists, a name critic Franz Schulze is also credited with coining. Their work was generally figurative, quirky and personal, and shared an interest in the surreal, the grotesque, the fantastical, and "low," folk, or outsider culture. Members of this (also informal) "group" included Ed Paschke, Roger Brown, Christina Ramberg, Barbara Rossi, Irving Petlin, Kerig Pope, and Ray Yoshida, among others. The group was the subject of a 2014 documentary by director Leslie Buchbinder, Hairy Who and the Chicago Imagists.

== Art ==
Don Baum, The Babies of della Robbia, plastic dolls, nylon, paint, wood, cloth and paper, 29 5/8" × 46 ½" x 9 5/16," 1965. Collection Museum of Contemporary Art Chicago, gift of Joseph and Jory Shapiro, 1992.51. Photo © MCA Chicago.

As an artist, Baum initially focused on painting, but turned to assemblage art, using doll parts and other found objects, in work that was often overtly political, particularly during the 1960s. In his later years, he focused on crafting small houses out of old paint-by-number pictures and other pieces.

Baum's work fits in with the Chicago Imagists, as well as the so-called "Monster Roster" of the 1950s and 1960s, an influential precursor group to the Imagists in Chicago. The Monster Roster was given its name in 1959 by Franz Schulze due to their existentialist, sometimes gruesome, semi-mystical figurative work. Many of them were influenced by psychoanalysis, Baum included: "My dependence on intuition, the sort of experimentation which led to discovering my images...came directly out of that kind of psychoanalytic experience." The Monster Roster was recognized in a major exhibition and book by the Smart Museum of Art, which examined its history and impact on the development of American art. Along with Baum, artists in the group included Leon Golub, Cosmo Campoli, George Cohen, Theodore Halkin, June Leaf, Arthur Lerner, Seymour Rosofsky, Nancy Spero, and H. C. Westermann, among others.

Baum first gained notice for disturbing assemblage works featuring bones and cast-off dolls and doll parts, such as The Babies of della Robbia (1965), now part of the MCA's permanent collection. The work references 15th-century Italian sculptor Andrea della Robbia's architectural decorations in relief finished, substituting broken dolls for the putti typical of his work. Baum participated in exhibitions in the 1960s that criticized and protested the Vietnam War, with works such as his disturbing portrait of then-President Lyndon Baines Johnson, L.B.J. (1967–68). In 1979, after a period of artistic inactivity, Baum began creating new works after seeing photographs of thatched structures built by boat people from Southeast Asia. The series, his last key one, called Domus, featured small houses made from disparate elements such as cutting boards, Chinese-checker sets, and paintings of Jesus.

Baum exhibited his work in solo exhibitions at the John L. Hunt (1965), Betsy Rosenfield (several, 1980–1992) and Carl Hammer (1999) galleries in Chicago, Galerie Darthea Speyer (1985) in Paris, and at institutions including the Hyde Park Art Center (1961, 1981), Madison Art Center, Illinois State Museum, and Krannert Art Museum (all 1988), among others.

== Education career ==
Baum served at many Chicago educational institutions over an education career of more than 45 years. He began as a Professor of Art at Roosevelt University in 1948, where he continued teaching until 1984. He served there as Chairman of the Art Department (1970–84). Baum also taught painting at the Hyde Park Art Center (1955–1965), and taught painting and drawing at the School of the Art Institute of Chicago (1993–6).

== Collections ==
Baum's art is represented in numerous public and private collections, including those of: The Art Institute of Chicago, Brauer Museum of Art, Fonds National d'Art Contemporain (Paris), Museum of Contemporary Art, Chicago, Hallmark Cards (Kansas City), Illinois Collections (State of Illinois Center), Illinois State Museum, Madison Art Center, Milwaukee Art Museum, National Museum of American Art, Smart Museum of Art, Weatherspoon Art Museum, and Racine Art Museum.

== Legacy ==
Baum launched the careers of many artists who became nationally and internationally known, and helped establish the notion of a Chicago counter-narrative to the privileged art narratives of his time. Art world figures in Chicago noted Baum's lasting significance at his passing. Chuck Thurow, executive director of the Hyde Park Art Center at the time, said, "He had an amazing eye for innovative, new artists that other people hadn't seen." The MCA called him a vital part of Chicago's art community for over fifty years. Tony Jones, Chancellor at the School of the Art Institute of Chicago, said, "Don really believed that Chicago had a vibrant art culture, that there were terrific artists in Chicago and that people should stay here." According to gallery owner Carl Hammer., who showed Baum's work, "He was one of the best promoters of Chicago art that Chicago has seen."
