= Chicago Imagists =

Artist group

The Chicago Imagists are a group of representational artists associated with the School of the Art Institute of Chicago who exhibited at the Hyde Park Art Center in the late 1960s.

Their work was known for grotesquerie, Surrealism and complete indifference to New York art world trends. Critic Ken Johnson referred to Chicago Imagism as "the postwar tradition of fantasy-based art making." Senior Chicago magazine editor Christine Newman said, "Even with the Beatles and the Vietnam War in the forefront, the artists made their own way, staking out their time, their place, and their work as an unforgettable happening in art history."

The Imagists had an unusually high proportion of female artists. There are three distinct groups which, outside of Chicago, are indiscriminately bundled together as Imagists: the Monster Roster, the Hairy Who, and The Chicago Imagists.

== The Monster Roster ==
The Monster Roster was a group of Chicago artists, several of whom served in World War II and were able to go to art school thanks to the G.I. Bill. They were given their name in 1959 by critic and Monster Roster member, Franz Schulze. The name was based on their existential, sometimes gruesome, semi-mystical figurative work. Many of them were mentored by Vera Berdich, an influential surrealist printmaker who taught at the School of the Art Institute of Chicago. The group was recognized in a major exhibition at the Smart Museum of Art at University of Chicago, which examined its history and impact on the development of American art. The Monster Roster included:

- Robert Barnes
- Don Baum
- Fred Berger
- Cosmo Campoli
- George Cohen
- Dominick Di Meo
- Leon Golub
- Theodore Halkin
- June Leaf
- Arthur Lerner
- Irving Petlin
- Seymour Rosofsky
- Franz Schulze
- Nancy Spero
- Evelyn Statsinger
- H. C. Westermann

== The Hairy Who ==
"Neither a movement nor a style, Hairy Who was simply the name six Chicago artists chose when they decided to join forces and exhibit together in the mid-1960s."

The Hairy Who was a "group" made up of six School of the Art Institute graduates, mentored by Ray Yoshida and Whitney Halstead.: Jim Falconer, Art Green, Gladys Nilsson, Jim Nutt, Karl Wirsum, and Suellen Rocca. They developed a vibrant and vulgar approach to art making- and after only six exhibitions together: three at the Hyde Park Art Center (in '66, '67, and '68), and three out of town, at the San Francisco Art Institute ('68), the School of Visual Art in New York ('69), and the Corcoran Gallery of Art in DC ('69), they decided to break up and continued on working on their own individual practices, and/or joined other groups.

In 1964, Jim Nutt, Gladys Nilsson and Jim Falconer approached the Hyde Park Art Center's exhibitions director, Don Baum (a key figure in the Hairy Who's success), with the idea of a group show consisting of the three of them, and Art Green and Suellen Rocca. Baum agreed, and also suggested they include Karl Wirsum. The six artists, held exhibitions at the Hyde Park Art Center in 1966, 1967, and 1968. They named the exhibitions "Hairy Who?" but never intended to organize themselves together as a unified group.

The Hairy Who's paintings were not only inspired by the commercial culture (advertisements, comics, posters, and sales catalogs) found on Chicago's streets but like many Americans of their time, their work came to be during a moment of radical conflict, the war in Vietnam, student-lead protests, counterculture, turbulent gender and racial relations, and the rapid extension of a capitalist consumer economy. Extremely acidic color choices outlined with thick black outlines, jazzy and psychedelic patterns with an adolescent sense of humor pervade the Hairy Who’s paintings, drawings and sculptures. Across the spectrum of each individual style it was impossible not to distinguish each individual artist from another, although they complement each other what brings them together is the prevalence of figuration, and a treatment of the human face and form that often verges on the grotesque or the cartoonish.

Their sense of humor embraced idiosyncrasy and spontaneity with wordplay, puns, and inside jokes that often belied the transgressiveness of their subject matter. Ambiguous, provocative, but also strategic, their work transmitted progressive ideas that challenged prevailing notions of gender and sexuality, social mores and standards of beauty, and nostalgia and obsolescence. New York gallerist Derek Eller, who has represented Wirsum since 2010, says that Wirsum had next to no presence in the city before that time: his sense is that “the Imagists were always out of sync with New York taste and style”. In the 1960s and 1970s this meant the sternly reductivist forms of Minimalism or Conceptualism; when figuration entered the New York mainstream, through Pop, it was via the mediating filter of contemporary mass media.

The Hairy Who, by contrast, were looking at an array of narrative and vernacular forms such as cartoons, tattoos, Outsider art (including the drawings of the self-taught Joseph Yoakum, who worked in Chicago) as well as the paintings and manuscripts of the Quattrocento, northern Renaissance painting, and traditional arts of Africa, Oceania, and the Pre-Columbian Americas. In their wide geographical and historical purview, they distanced themselves from the artistic vanguard (and its supporters) which tended to be fixated on its contemporary social and artistic moment.

For the first exhibition they collaborated on an arresting poster depicting a man’s heavily tattooed back, each tattoo designed by a different member of the group. A collaborative comic, The Portable Hairy Who!, was made in place of a catalog and sold at the show for 50 cents a copy. It immediately gave rise to a second show the following year, and another in 1968. The first show was excitedly reviewed (with illustrations) in the influential Artforum magazine by Professor Whitney Halstead of the School of the Art Institute of Chicago (SAIC), thus fulfilling the artists’ ambition to get their work to a wider audience. As a result, in 1968 Philip Linhares, the San Francisco Art Institute curator, offered them their first show outside Chicago. The next year, Walter Hopps, who had founded the Ferus Gallery in Los Angeles and was at the time the Curator of the Corcoran Gallery of Art in Washington DC, invited them to stage an exhibition.

The naming of the exhibition was explained in an interview conducted by Dan Nadel with artist Jim Nutt:

"At the time art show names were very cool, the less they said about the work the cooler (better). There had been a number of shows at MoMA… titled "Sixteen Americans" or "Thirteen Americans"... All of us were determined not to emulate such suave coolness, but didn't have a clue what would work. At our first get-together to discuss the show we were getting nowhere with this problem. This was also our first exposure to Karl in the flesh for the five of us. As frustration mounted from not solving the dilemma, group discussion disintegrated into smaller units, when Karl was heard saying plaintively, "Harry who? Who is this guy?" At which point some of us were hysterically incredulous that he didn't know about Harry Bouras, the exceptionally self-important artist who was the art critic for WFMT, the cultural FM station in Chicago. All of us found this very funny, including Karl, and as we bantered about variations of the situation, we realized the potential for the name, especially if we changed Harry to Hairy."

"Nonetheless, there is an important distinction to be made between The Chicago Imagist and Hairy Who, says Thea Liberty Nichols, the Researcher of Prints and Drawings at the AIC, who co-organized “Hairy Who? 1966-1969” with Mark Pascale, the Curator of Prints and Drawings and Ann Goldstein, the Deputy Director and Chair, and Curator of Modern and Contemporary Art. “The Hairy Who was an artist-designed, artist-named exhibition group while Chicago Imagism was a label was applied to a whole gaggle of artists by an outside critic,” Nichols says."

The Hairy Who included:

- Art Green
- Gladys Nilsson
- Jim Nutt
- Jim Falconer
- Suellen Rocca
- Karl Wirsum

== The Chicago Imagists ==
The Imagists were not a formal group, but rather a description of artists involved in shows curated by Baum in the mid-1960s and early 1970s. Several other artists, including Roger Brown, Ed Paschke, Barbara Rossi and Philip Hanson, are often incorrectly associated with the Hairy Who exhibitions, when in fact they showed at the Hyde Park Art Center between 1968-1971 in several other shows, such as "Non-Plussed Some", "False Image", "Chicago Antigua" and "Marriage Chicago Style". In addition to the Hairy Who, they included:

- Roger Brown
- Ed Paschke
- Christina Ramberg
- Philip Hanson
- Barbara Rossi
- Ed Flood
- Irving Petlin
- Sarah Canright
- Richard Wetzel
- Ray Yoshida
- Errol Ortiz
- Ronald Markman
- Lynn Duenow

In 1969 the Museum of Contemporary Art, Chicago exhibited many Imagists, including Yoshida, in a show entitled "Don Baum Says 'Chicago Needs Famous Artists'". Gallery owner Phyllis Kind gave Jim Nutt and Gladys Nilsson their first solo shows in 1970, and Roger Brown his first such show in 1971.

== Distinction between Chicago Imagism and New York Pop Art ==
Chicago private art dealer Karen Lennox said, "The Hairy Who sourced surrealism, Art Brut, and the comics. Pop art sourced the world of commercial advertising and popular illustration. One was very personal, the other anti-personal."

== Other artists ==
Outside of Chicago, any Chicago artist whose work is figurative and quirky is often called an Imagist. Chicago artists who paint strange and figurative works, but are not Imagists, include:

- Phyllis Bramson
- Richard Hull
- Paul Lamantia
- Robert Lostutter
- Hollis Sigler
- Eleanor Spiess-Ferris

In fact, Imagism as a style or school is elastic enough that abstract artists from Chicago working in an organic or surrealist-influenced style during Imagism's heyday, such as David Sharpe, Steven Urry, and Jordan Davies, have been described as "Abstract Imagists."

== Legacy ==
The legacy of The Chicago Imagists is notably explored in Pentimenti Production's film, Hairy Who and the Chicago Imagists, directed by Chicago filmmaker Leslie Buchbinder. In 2025, the Tang Teaching Museum published 3-D Doings: The Imagist Object in Chicago Art, the catalog of an exhibit held there in 2018-209. "Sixties Surreal," hosted Sept 24, 2025–Jan 19, 2026 at the Whitney Museum of American Art, and described by the musueum as "an ambitious, scholarly reappraisal of American art from 1958 to 1972," included the work of six Chicago Imagists.

== See also ==
- Lowbrow (art movement)
- Naïve art
- Outsider art
- Pop art
