= Christina Ramberg =

American painter (1946–1995)

- Born: August 21, 1946; Camp Campbell, Kentucky, U.S.
- Died: December 10, 1995 (aged 49); Naperville, Illinois, U.S.
- Education: School of the Art Institute of Chicago (BFA, MFA)
- Movement: Chicago Imagists
- Spouse: Philip Hanson

Christina Ramberg (August 21, 1946 – December 10, 1995) was an American painter and an influential and beloved member of Chicago's art scene. She was associated with the Chicago Imagists, a group of representational artists who attended the School of the Art Institute of Chicago in the 1960s. The Imagists, aka The Hairy Who, took their cues from Surrealism, Pop, and West Coast underground comic illustration, and their works often included themes of female sexuality. Ramberg often depicted partial female bodies (heads, torsos, hands) in undergarments, imagined in odd, seemingly erotic predicaments.

== Biography ==
Christina Ramberg was born on Camp Campbell, a Kentucky military base where her father, Vernon Ramberg, was an army officer. Her mother taught music lessons and due to Vernon's military service, the family moved frequently, including overseas. When Christina was two her family moved to Yokohama in Japan for two-and-a-half-years, and she attended school in Germany during her third and fourth grades. In the United States, the family lived in Kansas, Virginia, and Highwood, Illinois where Christina attended Highland Park High School for her junior and senior year.

Ramberg earned her Bachelor of Fine Arts in 1968 and her Master of Fine Arts in 1973 both from the School of the Art Institute of Chicago where she studied with Ray Yoshida, who was a primary mentor of the Chicago Imagists group that Christina became a part of. The group also included Karl Wirsum, Jim Nutt, Gladys Nilsson, Roger Brown, and Ed Paschke. Yoshida encouraged his students in the use of commercial and popular culture images such as comic books and magazines as a basis for their art. In Chicago she met her husband Philip Hanson who was also a student with Yoshida and who is also considered a member of the Chicago Imagists group. They were married in 1968, the same year that they both exhibited their work for the first time in the False Image show at the Hyde Park Art Center.

Ramberg and Hanson were both faculty members at the School of the Art Institute of Chicago. Hanson later reflected that "students liked her a lot. A good woman teacher was important to them, particularly in that time. It was much more dominated by men, so to have a teacher like Christina, who was doing her own work, that was a big deal. The men could be very nice, but it was really meaningful to learn from another woman." Ramberg and Hanson had one son, Alexander, who was born in 1975, but by 1980 the marriage had become strained, and they eventually agreed to live apart, although they remained close for the rest of their lives. In 1989 Ramberg was diagnosed with frontotemporal dementia and Hanson took care of her until she had to go to an assisted living facility in Naperville, Illinois. She died on December 10, 1995, at the age of 49.

In 2024, Ramberg was honored with a major retrospective at the Art Institute of Chicago, Christina Ramberg: A Retrospective.

== Freelance illustration ==
In the 1970s, Ramberg contributed illustrations to Playboy magazine, including art to accompany poems of Lawrence Durrell and Robert Graves and a story by Joyce Carol Oates, of style and content consistent with her work for the gallery.

== Style and works ==
The depiction of the female torso is the most common motif in Ramberg's art, with the torso being corseted, girdled, and otherwise constricted and veiled by the bondage-like trappings of typical 1950s female garments. Ramberg relates a memory of watching her mother dress for a party in an interview: "She would wear these—I guess that they are called 'Merry Widow[s]'—and I can remember being stunned by how it transformed her body, how it pushed up her breasts and slenderized down her waist. I think that the paintings have a lot to do with this, with watching and realizing that a lot of these undergarments totally transform a woman's body. … I thought it was fascinating … in some ways, I thought it was awful."

Another distinguishing feature of Ramberg's art is the absence of any faces, with the head not drawn at all, seen only from the back, or concealed by hair. The motif of the "hairdo" is likewise common in Ramberg's oeuvre, the hairstyle also being indicative of a type of mid-century female "conditioning" or conformity. Critic Katheryn Rosenfeld, in a 2000 New Art Examiner review stated: "it's... hard not to read in the work a psycho-sexual inventory of the limitations of white middle-class womanhood at mid-century."

Ramberg's first mature paintings are highly composed and finished to the point that they themselves are referred to as fetishistic. Worked on a Masonite support in fast-drying acrylics, they are precisely painted and are characterized by their low tone and muted palette, without visible brushstrokes. In a 2012 Art in America review, Nancy Princenthal described the draftsmanship in Ramberg's 1970 Corset/Urn series as "inky black with spiky pink highlights, they are prim and sexily sinister... deft, dark and reticent."

In the 1970s, Ramberg's work evolved from its strict focus on the female form to less sexualized, even non-human forms such as urns, chair backs and more abstract shapes. Her human forms turned from figures seen from the back or in profile to fully frontal torsos that are more rigid and robotic, and have both male and female characteristics. Still, her signature style remained: crisp, black outlines, muted colors, cropped forms, attention to pattern and detail.

By the early 1980s Ramberg took a break from her exploration of the female body and started to quilt more actively. Like her paintings, the patterns in her quilts are crisp and exact, with complex combinations of contrasting colors and forms. In the mid to late 1980s Ramberg's artwork shifted to include a "satellite" motif that incorporated some patterns and shapes from her quilting, while her color palette reverted to the gray, white, blue, and black of her earlier work instead of brighter colors. These later works are referred to as her "satellite" motif phase because the combination of circles, cones triangles, and lines resemble the plans for a telescope, satellite, or some other mechanical invention. The work reflects the influence of German artist August Natterer's precise technical drawings, be they of a pleated skirt or fanciful war machines.

=== Exhibitions ===
Ramberg did more group exhibitions than solo exhibitions during her lifetime, but has subsequently gained more individual recognition in contemporary art circles.

Exhibitions of Ramberg's work include

- Solo show (Ramberg's first) at Phyllis Kind Gallery (1974)
- Christina Ramberg: A Retrospective, 1968–1988 at the University of Chicago (1988)
- Christina Ramberg: Drawings, Gallery 400 at the University of Illinois (2000)
- The Making of Husbands : Christine Ramberg in Dialogue, KW Institute for Contemporary Art, Berlin (2019–2020)
- Christina Ramberg: A Retrospective, Art Institute of Chicago (2024), Hammer Museum, Los Angeles (2024–25), Philadelphia Museum of Art (2025)
- Four Chicago Artists: Theodore Halkin, Evelyn Statsinger, Barbara Rossi, and Christina Ramberg, Art Institute of Chicago (2024)

== Bibliography ==
- Seaman, Donna (2017). Identity Unknown: Rediscovering Seven American Women Artists. New York, NY: Bloomsbury USA. ISBN 9781620407585.
