= P. M. Wentworth =

American artist (1893–1985)

Perley Meyer Wentworth
- Born: 1893; Salem, Massachusetts, U.S.
- Died: 1985; San Diego, California, U.S.

Perley Meyer "P. M." Wentworth (1893–1985) was an American artist. His work is often described as outsider art.

== Life ==
Few details of Wentworth's life are known with any certainty. It has been established that he was employed at one point as a naval station night watchman, that much of his life was spent in California, including time in Oakland in the 1950s , and that he was a patient at DeWitt State Hospital.

== Work ==
Wentworth's entire surviving oeuvre consists of approximately forty pieces. The psychologist and artist Tarmo Pasto, who also brought Martin Ramirez to wider attention, discovered Wentworth's work and introduced it to the artist Jim Nutt. Nutt and his wife Gladys Nilsson were early collectors of Wentworth; they in turn introduced Wentworth's work to the curator Philip Linhares. Linhares included Wentworth in his trailblazing 1970 exhibition American Primitive and Naive Art, held at the San Francisco Art Institute.

Wentworth's work includes reinterpretations of biblical scenes, as well as extraterrestrial imagery and more abstract efforts. The Carpenter Center for the Visual Arts at Harvard University states that the inscriptions on Wentworth's pieces indicate that he "considered himself a medium between Earth and extraterrestrial worlds, and that his meditative work was a response to visions of the cosmos and of a quasi-Christian heaven." Many of Wentworth's pieces contain the word "imagination."

The Musée de l'Art Brut officially classifies Wentworth's work as Art Brut.
