= Phyllis Kind =

American art dealer (1933–2018)

- Born: Phyllis Barbara Cobin; April 1, 1933; New York City, New York, U.S.
- Died: September 28, 2018 (aged 85); San Francisco, California, U.S.
- Education: University of Pennsylvania (BA); Mannes School of Music (attended); University of Chicago (MA)

Phyllis Barbara Kind (née Cobin; 1933–2018) was an American art dealer active in Chicago and New York. She promoted the work of the Chicago Imagists and outsider artists.

== Early life and family ==
Phyllis Kind was born Phyllis Barbara Cobin in The Bronx, New York City on 1 April 1933 to Harold Cobin, a dentist, and Dorothy (Weintraub) Cobin. She was their only child. The family lived in Brooklyn as well as The Bronx. She and her mother also lived for about three years in St. Petersburg, Florida while her father performed military service. She attended the Bronx High School of Science and the University of Pennsylvania, where she studied chemistry. Her studies included chemistry at the graduate level.

She married Joshua Kind, whom she met at university, in 1956. The couple moved to New York City; Phyllis taught elementary school while Joshua pursued a PhD in Renaissance art at Columbia University. Phyllis also studied composition at the Mannes School of Music. They moved to Chicago in 1959; Joshua Kind taught at Northwestern University and, from 1962, the University of Chicago. Phyllis Kind received a master's degree in English literature from the University of Chicago.

They had four children, Jonathan, Gabriel, Deborah, and Rachel. The couple divorced in the 1970s.

== Career ==
Encouraged by her husband, Phyllis Kind opened a gallery in Chicago in 1967. Called Pro Grafica Arte, the gallery dealt in master prints and drawings. In 1975, she opened a gallery on Spring Street in New York's SoHo district. The gallery moved to a larger, ground floor space on Greene Street in 1983.

In 1998, Kind closed her Phyllis Kind Gallery in Chicago, located at 313 West Superior Street, in part as a result of the death of artist Roger Brown.

For 25 years, Ron Jagger served as director of Phyllis Kind Gallery in New York.

== Artists represented ==
Phyllis Kind became interested in the contemporary art scene of Chicago. She followed the work of a movement that, overall, was called the Chicago Imagists. In fact, the movement included three distinct subgroups: The Monster Roster; The Hairy Who; and the Chicago Imagists. She gave some of the artists in the movement their first solo shows: Jim Nutt and Gladys Nilsson in 1970 and Roger Brown in 1971. Among others shown in her Chicago gallery were Barbara Rossi, Richard Hull, Robert Lostutter, Ed Paschke, Paul Sierra, Christina Ramberg, Karl Wirsum, Joseph Yoakum, and Mary Lou Zelazny.

She also introduced the work of outsider artists. She was the first American gallerist to show contemporary and outsider work together. In 1972, Phyllis Kind presented her first group show of outsider art, "The Artless Artist: Contemporary 'Naive Works." Over the years, Kind showed Chicago custodian Henry Darger, Mexican artist Martín Ramírez (discovered by Nutt), Japanese artist Hiroyuki Doi, and Europeans Adolf Wölfli, Augustin Lesage, Carlo Zinelli. She promoted and marketed the work of Georgian Howard Finster. She was an advisor to Sanford L. Smith & Associates' annual Outsider Art Fair since its inception in 1992, and traditionally occupied the first booth on the show floor.

In New York, she mounted the first solo show for the miniaturist Mark Greenwold in 1979. Phyllis Kind sought out artists of originality who exhibited what she called "the art of necessity," "making art not because they might want to but instead because they have to." Among those were Alison Saar, Robert Colescott, William Copley, Gillian Jagger, and Cham Hendon. In her Soho gallery, Kind also showcased the work of Dan Keplinger, an artist with cerebral palsy, who was the subject of the 1999 Oscar-winning short documentary King Gimp.

== Later life and death ==
In 2009, Phyllis Kind closed her last gallery, a space in New York's Chelsea district that she had occupied since 2006.

Kind died in San Francisco, California on September 28, 2018, aged 85, from respiratory failure.

The 2019 Outsider Art Fair featured a space curated by Edward M. Gómez as a memorial to Phyllis Kind.
