= Ronald Markman =

American cartoonist (1931–2017)

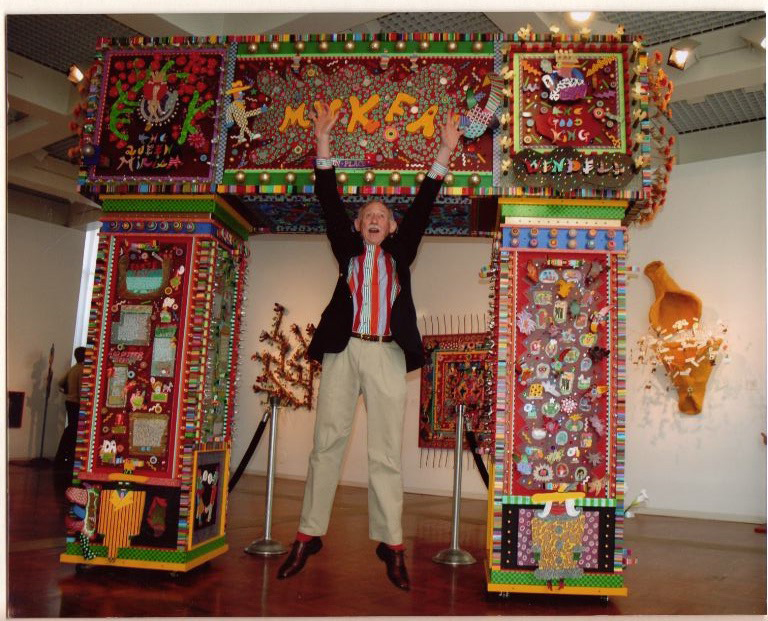
- Markman in front of his sculpture, Mukfa Gate
- Born: May 29, 1931; New York City, New York, U.S.
- Died: May 30, 2017 (aged 86); Annapolis, Maryland, U.S.
- Education: Art Students League of New York (attended); Cooper Union (attended); Yale University (BFA, MFA)
- Known for: Painting, sculpture
- Movement: Chicago Imagists

Ronald Markman (May 29, 1931 – May 30, 2017) was an American artist and educator best known for producing large colorful paintings and sculptures in a style that combined elements of Surrealism and pop art with a deep grounding in color theory. He integrated classical and popular culture, humor, as well as whimsy and riotous color to deliver social satire and a deeply personal vision of the world.

== Background and education ==
Markman was born in the Bronx, New York, during the middle of the Great Depression. As a child, Markman read Krazy Kat and Smokey Stover comics, attended Broadway shows with his family, and listened to Jack Benny, Fred Allen, and Edgar Bergen on the radio while doodling or drawing at his kitchen table. He aspired to be a professional cartoonist and, as a teenager, sold cartoons to Seventeen and Redbook magazines. While still in high school, he sought out and received advice from The New Yorker cartoonist Saul Steinberg, who served as an early role model. After reviewing Markman's portfolio, Steinberg encouraged him to pursue cartooning and suggested he hone his skills with formal art training. Markman enrolled in the Art Students League of New York, where he studied with George Grosz, and subsequently at Cooper Union. According to Markman, other early influences included Paul Klee, Marc Chagall, Joan Miró, Alexander Calder, and Claes Oldenburg.

In 1952, Markman was drafted into the army during the Korean War, where his talents were directed toward utilitarian tasks. "I painted signs. What else could they do with a painter? I was very lucky." said Markman. Two years later, after completing his service and earning the rank of sergeant, he enrolled at the Yale School of Art on the G.I. Bill. Notable friends and classmates during Markman's tenure at Yale included Eva Hesse, Joseph Raffael, and William Bailey, as well as the painter-turned-poet Mark Strand.

At Yale, Markman studied under the tutelage of Josef Albers, a geometric abstractionist considered the father of color theory and best known for his signature series Homage to the Square. Markman earned his BFA in 1957 and his MFA in 1959, studying color, drawing, and painting. Albers' instruction strongly influenced Markman's work throughout his lifetime. "I feel I owe Albers everything", said Markman. Markman also emphasized the importance of "learn[ing] about yourself and figur[ing] out how to translate your self-knowledge into art", stating that "You don't want to be like everyone else. You want to figure out what makes your art special and different in a meaningful and imaginative way."

== Early career and work ==
Markman's early work reflects the influences of Albers' philosophy of color theory, George Grosz's biting social satire, Markman's fascination with popular culture, and his personal perspective on the state of the world. Markman provides a commentary on the emergence, in the second half of the 20th century, of an increasingly commercialized and coarsened consumer culture that valued money, convenience, and sex over classical humanist values. His aesthetic was rooted firmly in his classical art training and was influenced by both popular culture and primitive artists. His drawings and paintings—which combined a mix of farce, pop-art, and narrative imagery to deliver a humorous take on society—gained early recognition at a national level.

Markman's first one-man exhibition at the Kanegis Gallery in Boston in 1959 was a critical and commercial success. That same year, three of his drawings were exhibited in a Recent Acquisitions show at the Museum of Modern Art in New York City. The next year (1960), his work was exhibited in the Whitney Annual and the Whitney Young America group exhibitions. His drawings were included in a group exhibition entitled Drawings of the Twentieth Century at the Arts Club of Chicago in 1962 and in the Chicago Biennial Print and Drawing Show at the Art Institute of Chicago in 1964. In 1965, Time Magazine wrote of his work, "The influence of such early heroes as Steinberg, Searle and the late George Grosz accounts, in part at least, for Markman's abundant satire and spare surrealism. But he seems to be something of a seer too." And in 1965, John Gruen of the New York Herald Tribune wrote, "A bit of Steinberg, a dash of Klee, and a soupcon of the English cartoonist Searle—and, voila—Markman... there are skill, humor, and delight to be found in these paintings and drawings."

Simultaneously, Markman laid the foundation for an influential academic career. He held teaching positions at the University of Florida and at the Kansas City Art Institute. In 1960, Markman was offered a position at the Art Institute of Chicago, where he would teach before holding a faculty position at Indiana University for 30 years. Some of his students, including Jim Nutt, went on to form the Hairy Who and Chicago Imagist movements. Harold Haydon of the Chicago Sun-Times and Alan Artner of the Chicago Tribune both identified Markman as a strong influence on the latter movement; Haydon christened him "the long-neglected father of Chicago Imagist painting".

A turning point in Markman's art came in 1962, when a Fulbright award took him to Rome, where his fascination with antique Italian maps inspired his creation of an imaginary, satirical country of his own. "The map had to have a name, so I came up with Mukfa", recounted Markman. "I wanted something slightly obscene, because the world is obscene, as you probably know." He described Mukfa as a "fantasy realm of unbridled absurdity" where his alter ego, Rolland Markum, and a cast of colorful characters existed uncensored in an exaggerated alternative reality. Mukfa, with its slyly bawdy name and iconic cast of cartoonish characters, became a recurring leitmotif throughout his career and a versatile vehicle for Markman's humorous social commentary.

== Later work and career ==
In 1965, Markman joined the Terry Dintenfass Gallery in New York City. Dintenfass, a prominent New York City gallery owner, had built a reputation as a dealer of iconic artists, including Jacob Lawrence, Horace Pippin, Ben Shahn, Charles Gwathmey, Richard Merkin, Arthur Dove, and many others, whose work broke from the mainstream. In reviewing Markman's first Dintenfass show in November 1965, John Canaday of The New York Times wrote, "Paul Klee seems to have been crossed with Mad magazine in these extremely detailed and often hilarious fantasies. The paintings are big and bright; a series of etchings are worth very close attention... everywhere the hilarity has an undertone of 'Better laugh while the laughing's good'."

Three years later, reviewing another one-man exhibit, Arts Magazine wrote, "Markman's art reveals a working mind, a keen sense of humor, a talent capable of creative flexibility in both painting and sculpture. Creation is a game and he enjoys playing with ideas, words, and reactions; a thinking artist, he comes across with a child-wild imagination, unlimited in it's [sic] fantasy, inventiveness, and vision. Markman creates his own language of art, a newspeak dictionary of words, a new species of people and a completely different environment which makes up his kind of world... On this fantastic voyage we see his unlimited imagination and creativity at work." The Dintenfass Gallery, with its mix of outsider and classically trained artists, as well as those with a strong illustrational bent, was a good fit for Markman; he exhibited at the gallery repeatedly over the next two decades.

As his work evolved, Markman continued to explore the tension between "High Art" and popular art and the polarity between these two modes of visual expression. In concert with many of the emerging Pop artists of his era, Markman was intrigued by the impact of advertising and commercialism on cultural identity and expression. Like Andy Warhol, Roy Lichtenstein, and Claes Oldenburg, he challenged the traditional conventions of classical fine art and referenced popular culture and everyday products. Markman borrowed from cartoon constructs and integrated found objects (such as buttons, paper flowers, and plastic fruit) into his art. Whereas other Pop artists brought a coolness and detachment to their work, Markman deployed riotous color, humor, and pun-filled word play to engage and invite interaction from the viewer. He drew from social situations and popular cultural icons to construct his own universe in which viewers saw themselves and society reflected in a truthful but lighthearted way.

From the mid-1960s through the early 1980s, Markman created a Mukfa installation comprising more than 75 paintings and sculpto-paintings. In his island country of Mukfa, Markman fashioned a sophisticated society of obvious foils and the pressing expediency of getting through life with its daily annoyances, as depicted through "go-go-go" or honking taxicabs on bridges and intersections; he conveyed sensory overload in his art through complex patterns, exciting colors, and exclamatory speech clouds. His Mukfa narratives and imagery included funny, tongue-in-cheek, and often poignant double entendres, wordplay, literary references, sexual innuendoes, and bawdiness.

Markman was a highly disciplined and prolific worker, producing a high volume of large and small-scale pieces in addition to the paintings set in his world of Mukfa when he was not teaching. He worked in multiple media, which included etching, bronze sculpting, and colored pencils. In 1969, the Museum of Modern Art commissioned him to create three holiday cards. In typical style, Markman poked fun at a conventional winter wonderland theme by drawing a camel in a parched desert dreaming of snowmen.

Over time, Markman moved away from the canvas. His later work became increasingly sculptural, combining painting and sculpture with a variety of found and everyday objects. As his work matured, Markman increasingly sought a more naïve aesthetic. Markman moved away from the limits imposed by the rectangular dimensions of canvas by painting on small pieces of masonite; these segments were then joined into a sequence that allowed a larger painting to develop into a synthetic whole and to assume unusual and even three-dimensional shapes in its final form. This gave his images, with their rough edges and their quirky, cockeyed forms, the freshness and directness characteristic of self-taught, outsider, and outlier artists. In reviewing this evolution, the SoHo Weekly News wrote in March 1979, "Ronald Markman used to paint on flat surfaces, like other painters. Recently he turned to creating painted wooden assemblages, and in so doing has produced some of the most enjoyable works on view this month."

Markman's vibrant, colorful constructions are intricately detailed, teeming with word play and populated by cartoon-like characters. Although his art often appears spontaneous and random, close inspection of Markman's work reveals deliberately planned detail. Grace Glueck of The New York Times wrote about Markman's work on January 20, 1984: "Ronald Markman's sprightly domestic scenes, wall pieces built up of painted wood cutouts, show he's paid close attention to comic strips, and also to the early works of Picasso and Braque. In lesser hands, this combination might not work, but—wildly mixing colors, scales, textures, dimensions, perspectives, illusion and reality—he brings it off with verve."

In addition to his Mukfa installation, Markman's two most significant works are a 16′ x 8.5′ x 2.25′ sculpto-painting entitled Mukfa Update (2008) and the 11′ x 10′ x 2.25′ Mukfa Gate (2005), the latter of which reflects components of Chinese temple gates. Both pieces are representative of Markman's signature style – vibrant three-dimensional constructions combining painting and sculpture, every inch teeming with tiny, detailed scenarios, punny wordplay, and populated with colorful cartoon-like characters.

Shortly after retiring from his position at Indiana University, Markman moved to Annapolis, Maryland, where he lived and worked until his death. St. John's College mounted two retrospectives of his work in 2005 and in 2017. He also had a show at the Maryland Hall for Creative Arts in 2010.

== Collections ==
Markman's work has been exhibited in galleries across the United States. His art has been collected by many leading museums, including:

- Art Institute of Chicago, Chicago
- Museum of Modern Art, New York
- Brooklyn Museum, New York
- Metropolitan Museum of Art, New York
- Hirshorn Museum, Washington, D.C.
- Library of Congress, Washington, D.C.
- Cincinnati Art Museum, Cincinnati
- Herbert F. Johnson Museum, Cornell University
- Indianapolis Museum of Art, Indianapolis
- Eskenazi Museum of Art, Indiana University
- Worcester Art Museum, Worcester, Massachusetts
- University of Alberta, Edmonton, Alberta
- University of Manitoba, Manitoba, Canada

== Selected exhibitions ==
- 1959: Kanegis Gallery, Boston
- 1959: "Recent Acquisitions Show", Museum of Modern Art, New York
- 1960: "Young America", Whitney Museum, New York
- 1960: Whitney Annual, Whitney Museum, New York, New York
- 1962: "Drawings of the Twentieth Century", Arts Club of Chicago, Chicago
- 1964: Chicago Biennial Print and Drawing Show, Art Institute of Chicago, Chicago
- 1965, 1966, 1968, 1971, 1976, 1979, 1982, 1985: Terry Dintenfass Gallery, New York, New York
- 1966: "Recent Acquisitions", Museum of Modern Art, New York
- 1968: 16th National Print Exhibition, Brooklyn Museum, New York (Purchase Prize)
- 1968, 1969, 1972, 1974: Contemporary American Painting, Indianapolis Museum of Art, Indianapolis
- 1972: "Humor, Satire, and Irony", The New School Art Center, New York
- 1974: Indianapolis Museum of Art, Indianapolis
- 1977, 1989: American Academy of Arts and Letters, New York
- 1981: Dart Gallery, Chicago
- 2005: "Heroes, Villains, and Mermaids" – Mitchell Gallery, St. John's College, Annapolis

== Personal life ==
Markman married Barbara Miller in 1959. Their daughter, Ericka, was born in 1961. Barbara Markman died in 1991. Several years later, Markman met Barbara Cabot, who moved with him to Annapolis, where they lived together until his death in 2017.

== Filmography ==
1994: Ever Since the Bad Thing Happened (short)
