= Gladys Nilsson =

American painter

- Born: May 6, 1940 (age 86); Chicago, Illinois, U.S.
- Education: School of the Art Institute of Chicago (BFA)
- Known for: Painting
- Movement: Chicago Imagism
- Spouse: Jim Nutt

Gladys M. Nilsson (born May 6, 1940) is an American artist, and one of the original Hairy Who Chicago Imagists, a group of representational artists active during the 1960s and 1970s. She is married to fellow-artist and Hairy Who member Jim Nutt.

== Biography ==
Gladys Nilsson was born to Swedish immigrant parents. She grew up on the north side of Chicago and attended Lake View High School, while also attending extracurricular drawing classes. Nilsson later attended the School of the Art Institute of Chicago, where she met her future husband, fellow student Jim Nutt. Nilsson and Nutt married in July 1961, and their son, Claude, was born in 1962. Although Nilsson originally painted with oil paints, she switched to watercolors when pregnant in order to avoid the hazards of turpentine.

In 1963, Nilsson and Nutt were introduced to School of the Art Institute of Chicago art history professor Whitney Halstead, who became a teacher, mentor, and friend. He introduced them in turn to Don Baum, exhibition director at the Hyde Park Art Center in Chicago. In 1964 Nilsson and Nutt became youth instructors at the Hyde Park Art Center.

Nilsson's image is included in the 1972 poster Some Living American Women Artists by Mary Beth Edelson.

== Artistic style ==
Gladys Nilsson's influences were far ranging and included German Expressionism, 15th Century Italian painting, Egyptian tomb murals, Cubism, and, more specifically, Whitney Halstead, Kathleen Blackshear, James Ensor, George Grosz, Paul Klee, Georges Seurat, John Marin, and Charles Burchfield. The result was a style that bordered on surrealism and pop, fantasy and cartoon. She took the human figure as her main subject, magnifying, multiplying, and distorting these figures as she saw fit.

According to the Chicago Tribune, her paintings "set forth a surreal mixture of fantasy and domesticity in a continuous parade of chaotic images."

=== The Hairy Who Years ===
In 1964, Jim Nutt and Gladys Nilsson began to teach children's classes at the Hyde Park Art Center in Chicago. The pair and James Falconer approached the center's exhibitions director, Don Baum, with the idea of a group show consisting of the three of them and Art Green and Suellen Rocca. Baum agreed, and also suggested they include Karl Wirsum. The name of the group show, "Hairy Who?", became the name of the group. It was coined by Karl Wirsum as a reference to WFMT art critic Harry Bouras. There were exhibitions at the Hyde Park Art Center in 1966, 1967, 1968, and 1969. The 1968 exhibition traveled to the San Francisco Art Institute, and the last show, in 1969, traveled to the Corcoran Gallery of Art in Washington, DC.

=== Later career ===
In 1969, Chicago gallery owner Phyllis Kind agreed to represent Nilsson and Nutt, giving both of them their first solo shows. The same year, the couple moved to Sacramento, California, where Nutt worked as an assistant professor of art at Sacramento State College. In 1973, Nilsson became the first Hairy Who member to have a solo show at the Whitney Museum of American Art in New York. Two of her paintings were stolen from the show. In 1974, Nilsson and her family returned to Chicago, moving to Wilmette in 1976.

Though she has traditionally painted with watercolors on paper, Nilsson has also worked with collage. In her later work, Nilsson cut out imagery from fashion magazines in an exploration of ideals of feminine beauty.

She had a retrospective of her art in the spring of 2010 at the Ukrainian Institute of Modern Art in Chicago.

In 2010, Philadelphia art collector, Linda Lee Alter, donated her 500-work Art by Women Collection to the Pennsylvania Academy of the Fine Arts. Alter’s original intention for the collection was to one day be provided to a public institution. The collection includes works of Gladys Nilsson alongside Louise Bourgeois, Elizabeth Catlett, Viola Frey, Alice Neel, Louise Nevelson, Faith Ringgold, and other great women artists. In a 2012-13 exhibition, the Pennsylvania Academy of the Fine Arts presented 200 works of Alter’s collection, including four works by Nilsson. Her watercolor on paper, Beset by Small Problems, 1990; hand colored etching on paper, The String Game, 1993; acrylic & collage on canvas & metal hoop, Blue Vue, 1997; and watercolor and gouache on paper, Looking Back, 1999.

Nilssons’ Rounding Rosie's Ring: Dance, You Fools, Dance, 2024 was incorporated into the “Alive & Kicking” exhibition alongside contemporary artists, Thomas Laningan-Schmidt and Catalina Schliebener Muñoz. The mural was a four-sided wall installation made on-site in the gallery using mediums of charcoal, chalk, graphite, marker, and wall paint. The 2024 exhibition was held at the Joan Dignam Schmaltz Gallery of Art at the Paul J. Schupf Art Center in downtown Waterville, Maine.

Caked: a plein air romp with bakery goods, 2025, is permanently installed in gallery 286 at the Art Institute of Chicago. The mural is a creative celebration of Nilsson’s 85th birthday and was created with the assistance of Megann Lawlor, 2024–25 McMullan Arts Leadership Intern. A look into her creative process was captured in a brief interview as she shared she hopes people view the mural and “just smile.”

== Exhibitions ==
=== Selected solo exhibitions ===
==== 1971 ====
- Gladys Nilsson, Art Gallery, Chico State College, Chico, California
- Gladys Nilsson, Candy Store Gallery, Folsom, California

==== 1973 ====
- Gladys Nilsson, Whitney Museum of American Art, New York, April 12–May 13

==== 1979 ====
- Gladys Nilsson, Portland Center for the Visual Arts, Oregon, January 18–February 18

==== 1979–1980 ====
- Gladys Nilsson: Survey of Works on Paper, 1967–1979, Fine Arts Gallery, Wake Forest University, Winston-Salem, North Carolina, September 17–October 17, 1979; Art Gallery, Corpus Christi State University, Texas, January 8–31, 1980; Wustum Museum of Fine Arts, Racine, Wisconsin, February 17–March 23, 1980

==== 1984 ====
- Gladys Nilsson: Greatest Hits from Chicago, Selected Works 1967–1984, Randolph Street Gallery, Chicago, May 5–June 23
- Gladys Nilsson, Candy Store Gallery, Folsom, California, November

==== 1993 ====
- Sum Daze: Hand-Colored Etchings by Gladys Nilsson, Dime Museum, Chicago, September 10–October 4

==== 1996 ====
- Gladys Nilsson, Crocker Art Museum, Sacramento, California, March–April

==== 2000 ====
- Gladys Nilsson, Rosemont College, Rosemont, Pennsylvania, February 3–March 3

==== 2003 ====
- Gladys Nilsson, Adrian College, Adrian, Michigan, January 6–25
- Gladys Nilsson, University Art Gallery, Saginaw Valley State University, University Center, Michigan, October 3–29

==== 2006 ====
- Gladys Nilsson, Tarble Art Center, Eastern Illinois University, Charleston, January 21–February 26

==== 2010 ====
- Gladys Nilsson: Works from 1966–2010, Ukrainian Institute of Modern Art, Chicago, April 9–May 23

2026

- Gleefully Askew: A Gladys Nilsson Retrospective, Crocker Art Museum, Sacramento, July 19--November 29

== Collections ==
- Art Institute of Chicago
- Brauer Museum of Art, Valparaiso University, Indiana
- Kresge Art Museum, Michigan State University, Lansing
- Los Angeles County Museum of Art
- Madison Museum of Contemporary Art, Wisconsin
- Maier Museum of Art at Randolph College, Lynchburg, Virginia
- Mary and Leigh Block Museum of Art, Northwestern University, Evanston, Illinois
- Midwest Museum of American Art, Elkhart, Indiana
- Milwaukee Art Museum
- Morgan Library, New York
- Museum of Contemporary Art, Chicago
- Museum of Modern Art, New York
- Museum Moderner Kunst, Vienna
- New Orleans Museum of Art
- Pennsylvania Academy of the Fine Arts, Philadelphia
- Philadelphia Museum of Art
- Phoenix Art Museum
- Roger Brown Study Collection, School of the Art Institute of Chicago
- Smithsonian American Art Museum, Washington, DC
- Whitney Museum of American Art, New York
- Yale University Art Gallery, New Haven, Connecticut
