= Art Green (artist) =

American painter (1941–2025)

- Born: May 13, 1941; Frankfort, Indiana, U.S.
- Died: April 14, 2025 (aged 83)
- Education: School of the Art Institute of Chicago (BFA)
- Known for: Painter
- Movement: Chicago Imagism
- Spouse: Natalie Novotny (died 2020)

Arthur Green (May 13, 1941 – April 14, 2025) was an American painter who was one of the original Hairy Who members from Chicago, a group of students from the School of the Art Institute of Chicago who exhibited together in the 1960s and 1970s and made representational art with a slight surrealist touch. He was also a member of the University of Waterloo's faculty for over 30 years. His style of his paintings mixes pop-art motifs with surrealist tendencies. His upbringing in Chicago and its vicinity may have influenced him, from the accessibility of the Art Institute of Chicago to the architecture of Louis Sullivan, but he also may have been influenced by advertisements from the 1940s and 1950s that had undertones of sexuality. His paintings drew from American popular imagery, but complicated it, often using the full spectrum of vibrant colors and combining trompe-l'œil effects to play with the viewer's sense of balance.

== Biography ==
Green was born in Frankfort, Indiana. His father was a civil engineer who designed bridges; his mother crafted quilts and grew flowers. Green initially set out to be a car designer, though he switched gears to graphic design when he started at the School of the Art Institute of Chicago. However, during his first year he had trouble finding enough graphic design classes to take, so he switched his focus once again to painting. In 1965, he earned his Bachelor of Fine Arts.

Green first came to prominence in 1966, when he joined five other recent Art Institute graduates for the first of a series of group exhibitions called The Hairy Who at a series of shows at Chicago's Hyde Park Art Center. The strange name reflected the trend in monikers for rock groups of the time. The other members of the group were James Falconer, Gladys Nilsson, Jim Nutt, Suellen Rocca, and Karl Wirsum. Their work was known for its coarseness and vulgarity. It stood in contrast to the sleek and urban work by Manhattan artists at the time, namely Andy Warhol and James Rosenquist.

Between 1966 and 1967 Green worked at various Chicago public schools teaching seventh grade art. Between 1967 and 1968 he worked at Chicago City College as an Instructor. Green taught basic design, interior design, and art history. The following year he moved to Kendall College of Art and Design, Evanston, Illinois, to assume a position as the Chair of the Fine Arts Department. There he taught studio and art history courses. In 1969, Green married Natalie Novotny (also a graduate of the Art Institute of Chicago), whose Art Institute education in pattern and fabric design became a strong influence on his work. He also accepted a teaching position at the Nova Scotia College of Art and Design University as an assistant professor.

Finally, in 1975, he received a Canada Council bursary, which enabled him to teach painting and drawing at the University of British Columbia. In 1976, he moved to Stratford, Ontario to teach at the University of Waterloo. While at UW, he served two terms as Chair of the Fine Arts Department; 1988–1991 and 2000–2002. He lived in Canada ever afterwards with two children, Catherine and Nicholas.

In 2005, the Kitchener-Waterloo Art Gallery hosted Heavy Weather: Art Green Retrospective in collaboration with the University of Waterloo Art Gallery. This exhibition brought together 50 of Green's pieces, loaned from the artist and several private and public collectors in the United States and Canada, as a comprehensive survey of his 40-year career. Gary Michael Dault created a soft cover book with the same Heavy Weather title. The book contains photographs of the 50 pieces, commentary, and resource images which had inspired Green.

In 2006, the University of Waterloo gave him emeritus status.

Green died April 14, 2025, at the age of 83.

== Artistic style ==
Green's style falls somewhere between surrealism and pop art, with hints of op art. Two of his major influences, both in the collection of the Art Institute of Chicago, are René Magritte and Giorgio de Chirico. He sought to capture the straightforwardness and mystery evoked in these surrealist's paintings. Sometimes, he even directly quoted them, using curtains and multi point perspectives to describe architectural elements. He also enjoyed the work of James Rosenquist, whose work was more about surface than substance; however, Green's objects appear to have a psychological rather than just a visual presence.

The imagery Green used throughout his entire career, and continued to use throughout his life, was drawn from illustrated textbooks and advertising of the 1940s and 1950s that touch on technological and roadside Americana, with overt themes of sexual symbolism. Imagery includes ice cream cones, bridges, incomplete bridges, mirrors, scissors, women's painted fingernails, passionate couples, tires, moons floating over water, puzzle pieces, silhouettes of a plane flying overhead, searchlights, tornados, women's nylon-covered legs, wood grain, leather cords, screws, cables, knots, zippers, tapes, stitches, Necker cubes, and other optical illusions. The paintings tend to have torn or stitched imagery that evokes the trompe-l'œil tradition; transparent and solid planes overlap, too, achieving a high level of spatial complexity. Though the illusory depth of his paintings is not all that deep, the viewer still finds himself looking at, into, and through his paintings.

Green's artwork is full of dichotomies. He had a keen interest in examining our relationship to reality, or, more specifically, the difference between looking and seeing and the rewards of the latter. He combined order and chaos, but every force is balanced and contained. This order calms the chaos in time; the viewer is rewarded for spending time with his canvases as hidden objects reveal themselves in an endless tension between rationalism and irrationalism.

=== 1960s ===
Green's initial forays into art making closely resembled the Abstract Expressionist tradition, like most artists born around his time. However, he eventually stumbled upon a book on Giorgio de Chirico's metaphysical period and quickly changed his style. He suddenly became interested in the absurdity of everyday life and betwixt by a dream world created in modern-day advertising. His turn towards surrealism at this juncture made absolute sense to him.

Art Green was one of the original six members of the Hairy Who. This was a group of artists who studied together at the School of the Art Institute of Chicago and later exhibited together six times in the 1960s. Their first show was at the Hyde Park Art Center in Chicago in 1966; subsequently, they exhibited twice more at the Hyde Park Art Center, once at the San Francisco Art Institute, once at the Corcoran Art Gallery in Washington, D.C., and once at the Visual Arts Gallery in New York. Though their primary interest in exhibiting together stemmed from the fact that they were all friends and colleagues, there are stylistic similarities in their artwork. All of these artists' work have tendencies towards a cartoon style or pop art; there is a high degree of visual resolution in their drawings and paintings and a sense of horror vacui fills their canvases.

=== 1970s ===
By the 1970s, Green had become increasingly interested in trompe-l'œil effects on his canvas. His paintings increasingly made use of a tape motif, which gave surface texture a pictorial representation; it's almost as if there is a picture within a picture in these paintings. An erotic nostalgia pervades his mixed up and overlapping still lifes, as he combines fragments of contemporary life into highly stylized and symmetric patterns. His paintings take on a prism-like appearance as he reinterpreted familiar images. Increasingly so, he turns away from the figure and focuses only on cropped views of fingernails and hands.

=== 1980s ===
In the mid-1980s, Green was interested in the Necker cube. He wrote, "I was intrigued by the possibilities of simultaneously representing all sides of a rotating cube. I incorporated tiling patterns of unfolded cubes along with the hypercube in my work." His interest in illusion extended off of the canvas and actually began affecting the shape of the canvas itself by the 1980s. The canvases, too, appeared to be constructed from individual pieces of polished glass; his paintings became monuments to a secular campy artificiality. Nothing was quite as it seemed in these canvases, where Green was more interested in disrupting the narrative via a manipulation of both form - i.e. he uses shaped canvas - and content - i.e. the scenes within his paintings appear cropped, giving only sensuous and flickering views of a hidden tale.

=== 1990s and 2000s ===
Of his more recent work, Green wrote, "I have been trying to make layered paintings that take a long time to "see". I want to encourage the viewer to be conscious of the (usually unconscious) process of the interpretation and construction of images in the mind." He continued making use of shaped canvas and a visual complexity of his handling of paint that closely resembles a kaleidoscope. To his dying day, he continued to use the same motifs of a flickering flame, wood paneling, ice cream cone, woman's fingernail, etc.

=== Noteworthy pieces ===
- Absolute Purity, 1967, Tastee-Freeze series
- Immoderate Abstention, 1969, Fire and scissors
- Saturated Fat, 1971, Tastee-Freeze series
- Blank Slate, 1978, oil on canvas. First painting of an extended series that involve images of mirrors.
- Risky Business, 1980, a fire-and-fingernail totem with a layered and shaped canvases
- Persons Unknown, 1985, layered and shaped canvases
- Double Crosser, 1991, imagery is secured, wired, lashed, tied-off, taped, and fastened with screws
- Circular Argument, 1994, layered and shaped canvases

== Collections ==
Green's paintings are in many public collections including:

- Akron Art Museum, Ohio
- Art Institute of Chicago
- Brauer Museum of Art, Valparaiso University, Indiana
- Canada Council Art Bank, Ottawa, Ontario
- Dalhousie University Art Gallery, Halifax, Nova Scotia
- David and Alfred Smart Museum of Art, University of Chicago
- Museum Moderner Kunst, Vienna
- Museum of Contemporary Art, Chicago
- National Gallery of Art, Washington, D.C.
- Pennsylvania Academy of the Fine Arts, Philadelphia
- Smithsonian American Art Museum, Washington, D.C.
- Yale University Art Gallery, New Haven, Connecticut

== Honors ==
- 1991, awarded the Distinguished Teacher Award at the University of Waterloo
- 1999, elected to Membership of the Royal Canadian Academy of Arts
- 2004, awarded the Waterloo Regional Arts Council Arts Award for Visual Art
- 2016, received an honorary doctorate of Fine Art from the School of the Art Institute of Chicago

[31]|

== See also ==
- List of University of Waterloo people

== Bibliography ==
- Heavy Weather: Art Green Retrospective. Kitchener: Kitchener-Waierloo Art Gallery. 2005.

== General references ==
- University of Waterloo Press Release- April 2004. Retrieved on November 28, 2006.
- Border Crossings- Issue 96. Retrieved on November 28, 2006.
- National mag features Stratford. Retrieved on June 29, 2007.
- Kitchener Waterloo Art Gallery- CV. Retrieved on October 1, 2007.
