= Paul Lamantia =

American visual artist (born 1938)

- Born: Paul Christopher Lamantia; 1938 (age 87–88); Chicago, Illinois, U.S.
- Education: School of the Art Institute of Chicago (attended)
- Style: Figurative, Chicago Imagism, art brut
- Website: Official website

Paul Christopher Lamantia (born 1938) is an American visual artist, known for paintings and drawings that explore dark psychosexual imagery. He studied at the School of the Art Institute of Chicago and emerged in the 1960s and 1970s as part of the larger group of artists known as the Chicago Imagists.

Lamantia often depicts surreal, distorted figures in transgressive scenarios, rendered in a formally structured, dizzying patterns, line and high-key color; he has been influenced by Expressionism, High Renaissance and Baroque art, and psychoanalytic theory. Art historian Robert Cozzolino suggests his work implies imply multiple levels of meaning: allegories of lust, confessional hallucinations about sexual anxiety, visions from an altered state. Critic Dennis Adrian called him "a Chicago maverick" whose work "challenges and wrenches" the limits of acceptability and taste, while Franz Schulze described him as one of the city's "most brutal and coldly expressionist" figurative artists.

Lamantia attracted early attention from artist Jean Dubuffet and has been recognized with retrospectives at the Koehnline Museum of Art (2016), Loyola University (2002) and the Hyde Park Art Center (1982), and reviews in national art publications and major newspapers. His work has been shown at the Art Institute of Chicago and Museum of Contemporary Art, Chicago and sits in their permanent collections, as well as those of the Smithsonian American Art Museum and Milwaukee Art Museum, among many. Lamantia lives and works in Chicago.

Paul Lamantia, Like Father Like Son, mixed media, 31 1/8"x 41 5/16", 1968, Pennsylvania Academy of Fine Arts collection.

== Life and career ==
Lamantia was born Walter Zombek in Chicago, Illinois in 1938, and adopted by Joseph and Nellie Lamantia at age two. His early visual education included underground comics, museum trips with his mother, his father's collection of 1940s soft-core porn and girlie culture novelties, and a 14-week scholarship he won to study drawing at the Art Institute of Chicago. As a teenager, he studied under advertising artist Jules Zinni, intending to become a commercial illustrator. Between 1957–9, he attended the American Academy of Art in Chicago, learning figure drawing from artist-illustrator William Mosby, and worked as an advertising graphic designer, before enlisting in the U.S. Army Reserves in 1960. In the service, his caricature skills came to light and he painted sixteen murals at Fort Leonard Wood, Missouri and Fort Riley, Kansas.

After his service, Lamantia took night classes at the School of the Art Institute of Chicago (SAIC) and resumed advertising work, but soon elected to pursue a fine art career. He studied at SAIC with professors Ray Yoshida, Whitney Halstead and Vera Burdick, and was a contemporary of the Chicago Imagists. Lamantia exhibited in shows at the city's key poles of artistic influence, the Art Institute of Chicago ("Chicago and Vicinity," 1962, 1964, 1965) and the Illinois Institute of Technology ("The Sunken City Rises," 1964; "Phalanx," 1965). In 1964, after taking additional education courses at the University of Chicago, he earned a BFA, followed by an MFA in 1968. During this time, he discovered and was inspired by Dr. Hans Prinzhorn's 1922 book, Artistry of the Mentally Ill—a key influence on Jean Dubuffet's Art Brut—which emphasized the unconscious, hallucinations, and interior reality.

Lamantia became known for his obsessive drawings through group exhibitions at the Hyde Park Art Center, Museum of Contemporary Art, Chicago (MCA), and Art Institute. In 1972, Jean Dubuffet took notice of Lamantia's work, eventually exchanging work with him and hosting him in Paris. In subsequent years, Lamantia showed in regular solo exhibitions at Zaks Gallery (1977–2000), and was featured in shows at the American Academy of Arts and Letters (1975), School of the Art Institute ("Visions", 1976), Crocker Art Museum ("The Chicago Connection", 1976–7, traveling), Smithsonian Institution ("Chicago Currents," 1979–80, traveling), Artists Space, New York ("Recent Art from Chicago," 1986), Figge Art Museum ("Chicago Imagism: A 25-Year Survey," 1994), and MCA Chicago ("Art in Chicago 1945–1995").

In addition to his art career, Lamantia taught art in Chicago Public Schools (CPS) from 1966 to 1993. After retiring from CPS, he continued to teach workshops and courses and lecture at institutions including SAIC, Columbia College, International Academy of Design and Technology, Loyola University, Harry S. Truman College, the Art Academy of Cincinnati, and Cincinnati Art Museum. His art is informed by travels he and his wife, Sheryl R. Johnson, have undertaken to thirty-four countries, including China, Egypt, Hong Kong, India, Mexico, Nepal, Russia, Thailand, Tibet, Turkey, and many throughout Europe.

== Work ==
Paul Lamantia, Cancellation, oil on canvas, 95" x 77", 1974–5.

Critical consensus on Lamantia's art centers around four aspects, its: 1) "high voltage" emotional impact; 2) pushing of form and subject matter to aesthetic and psychological extremes; 3) meticulous, expressive technique; and 4) outsider status beyond mainstream critical categories, which has led some to classify him as an Art brut artist. In 1972, Dennis Adrian described it as "harsh and hysterical" and "profoundly shocking"; four decades later, Margaret Hawkins called it "manic, roiling, chaotic, terrifying, and maybe terrified" work that "seethe[s] with sticky, undiluted id."

Lamantia's work reflects a wide consumption of art history, drawing inspiration from Expressionist and Surrealist "automatism", masters such as Titian and Rubens, Outsider art and Cubism, the Chicago "Monster Roster" school and Peter Saul, comic artists Robert Crumb and Basil Wolverton, as well as Freudian and Jungian theories of the unconscious. In terms of chronology and psychology, critics write that he "hovers at the edge" of the Chicago Imagists, sharing themes of sex, aggression, and psychological menace and a tendency towards vernacular expression. In the historical volume, Art in Chicago (2018), curator Robert Cozzolino suggests his peripherality—as with Chicagoans Linda Kramer and Robert Lostutter—results partly from not exhibiting under the "Hairy Who" or similar banners, but mainly, from his more thematically startling and ferocious depictions of socially transgressive sexuality. Critics Peter Frank and Hawkins concur, describing his work as rawer than the Imagists, with cartooniness a "wrapper for something scarier, less aesthetic and polite." Writer-gallerist John Corbett identified Lamantia as a "psychosexual outlaw, making utterly original work with one foot inside and one outside the Imagist camp."

=== Painting ===
Lamantia first gained notoriety in the 1960s for his unfiltered, high-energy drawings. By the early 1970s, critics suggested that his more controlled and deliberately composed paintings had caught up in terms of freedom of invention and integration of feeling and execution. In monumental works, he depicted surreal, ambiguously-sexed figures and groups—sirens, buxom temptresses, leather-clad dominatrixes, voyeurs, and mutant beasts—undergoing dizzying transformations into giant insects, plant-like forms and horrific organic conglomerations, while engaged in discomfiting, sometimes predatory sexual dramas. In these paintings, faces, skin, sinuous legs, torpedo breasts, muscles and organs blend or morph into invented anatomies of snapping jaws, sprouting eyes, bird beaks, claws, tentacles and machine, while skin, makeup, masking, tattooing, scarring and costuming become indistinguishable, rendering interpretation compellingly ambiguous, for many critics.

Paul Lamantia, Blood Love, oil on canvas, 60" x 48", 1993.

In works such as Cancellation (1974–5) and Night Language 2 (1977), Lamantia set his scenes in garish, compressed domestic interiors that recall the harrowing rooms of Francis Bacon and Max Beckmann. Critics described the work as a tangle of bewildering abstract patterns, high-key color, frenzied line and strong contour, with contradictory forms that lacked a focal point or orientation to distinguish figure from ground. Simultaneously, they noted a clear level of formal structural integrity deriving from what Franz Schulze called Lamantia's "controlled wildness" and his absorption of classical genre compositions of female nudes in interiors from Titian to Matisse.

Paul Lamantia, The Collector of Unfulfilled Dreams, oil on canvas, 55" x 49", 2010.

In the 1980s, critics observed that Lamantia's paintings, while thematically as unnerving as ever, became leaner, more painterly and open, and reminiscent of Willem de Kooning's savage "Woman" paintings. Works from Whisper (1980) to Blood Love (1993) featured a subdued, finessed palette of whites, light yellows, pastels and deep purples, that enhanced the rhythms of streamlined, Baroque compositions employing illusionistic, theatrical space. Alan Artner compared the technique to Bacon's appropriation of Monet-like painterliness in his disquieting works; Buzz Spector felt this joy in painting offset a potentially moralistic tone in the work. Lamantia's figuration also evolved towards an H.P. Lovecraftian, sci-fi-like "mechano-morphism," with "metallic musculature suggesting malevolent sexual machinery" merging with his existing re-grafted mutations.

Lamantia's paintings from the later 1990s onward returned to the more claustrophobic compositions of earlier work, incorporating the linear freedom of his drawings, but in a "less manic and tortured" form that critics described as "an amiable kind of chaos." James Yood called the work a "strangely hypnotic" catalogue of unmediated male desire "immersed in sheer pictorial thrill." He suggested that Lamantia's uncensored, possibly confessional frankness about contradictory aspects of desire in works such as Still Lives (1995) elevated what might seem retrograde or misogynist, much like Picasso's 1920s–1930s work. Late paintings, such as The Solution (2010) or The Collector of Unfulfilled Dreams (2012)—Lamantia's "unnerving reworking of the Garden of Eden story"—feature a greater emphasis on the materiality of paint, the expressive possibilities of gestural accident, and flirtation with abstraction.

=== Drawing ===
In the 1960s, Lamantia attracted notice for drawings packed with sprawling comic- and Miró-like forms and explosive energy, that some compared to the fantasy-scapes of Roberto Matta or Hieronymous Bosch. Working in ball-point and felt-tip pen, pastel, gouache, collage, color pencil and crayons, he produced frenzied, intricate work that was unstable in its emotion and forms, and suggested a spontaneity that critics said was belied by its technical richness and finesse. Robert Cozzolino called works of the time, such as Like Father Like Son (1968), "extraordinarily raw and vulnerable" treatments of family, identity and emotional states, that portrayed the angst of the period and its "the-personal-is-the-political" ethos.

Paul Lamantia, Peep Freak, mixed media, 35" x 45", 2001.

Critics hold that the drawings, while thematically similar, are neither tangential nor mere studies, but autonomous, open-ended works that explore oneiric, metaphysical and visionary pursuits with a searing, concentrated energy. Cozzolino, and others, consider the drawings to be among the least well-known, understudied bodies of work among artists of Lamantia's generation. John Corbett, nonetheless, suggests that this work built "a historical bridge between the rough-hewn feel of earlier Monster Roster artists and the sleek, cartoonish gleam of later Imagist work."

Lamantia's drawing has continued apace his painting in subsequent decades, including some monochromatic drawings in the 1970s, such as Your Favorite Sores Bronze Plated in Raw Meat and The Vendor of His Scars (Art Institute of Chicago collection), both from 1977. In the catalogue to Lamantia's 2016 retrospective, Margaret Hawkins described late drawings, such as Oddball Losers (2000) and Peep Freak (2001), as gorgeous explorations of "infinite inner space" that flow "directly from the subconscious" and teem with provocative sensory information Since 2014, Lamantia has started painting on frozen pizza boxes, leaving portions of the color food photography to peek through and morph into skin and eyes; these works share an affinity with 16th-century Mannerist Giuseppe Arcimboldo's "whimsically grotesque portraits." In addition to his drawings, Lamantia has also created prints at Anchor Press in Chicago and Lakeside Press in Michigan.

== Collections and recognition ==
Lamantia's work belongs to public collections, including those of the Smithsonian American Art Museum, Art Institute of Chicago, Museum of Contemporary Art, Chicago, Collection de l'art brut (Lausanne, Switzerland), Milwaukee Art Museum, Madison Museum of Contemporary Art, Cincinnati Art Museum, Elmhurst Art Museum, Figge Art Museum, Contemporary Museum, Honolulu, Pennsylvania Academy of Fine Arts, Brauer Museum of Art, Smart Museum of Art, Mary and Leigh Block Museum of Art, Minneapolis Institute of Art, The Playboy Collection, Illinois State Museum, DePaul Art Museum, Ukrainian Institute of Modern Art, and Wright Museum of Art, among others. In 1984, he was recognized with the Art Institute of Chicago's Logan Prize.
