= Ray Yoshida =

American artist (1930–2009)

- Born: Raymond Kakuo Yoshida; October 3, 1930; Kapaa, Hawaii, U.S.
- Died: January 10, 2009 (aged 78); Kauai, Hawaii, U.S.
- Education: University of Hawaii, Manoa (attended); School of the Art Institute of Chicago (BFA); Syracuse University (MFA)
- Movement: Chicago Imagists

Raymond "Ray" Kakuo Yoshida (October 3, 1930 – January 10, 2009) was an American artist known for his paintings and collages, and for his contributions as a teacher at the School of the Art Institute of Chicago from 1959 to 2005. He was an important mentor of the Chicago Imagists, a group in the 1960s and 1970s who specialized in distorted, emotional representational art.

Born in Hawaii, Yoshida returned there after 2005 when his health began to fail. He studied at the University of Hawaii, but was drafted into the army during the Korean War. Yoshida resumed his studies in Chicago, and received degrees from the School of the Art Institute of Chicago and Syracuse University.

Yoshida's paintings are strongly influenced by comics and his personal collection of folk art and found objects. His collages are strongly graphic, placing "tiny, oddly shaped details of architecture, fabric, hairdos and other unidentifiable elements" in ordered rows of fragments and tiers . Critic Ken Johnson called his collages "formally captivating, dreamily strange and comically absurd." Both he and his work are referred to as enigmatic, mysterious, and witty.

As a professor, Yoshida was an influential mentor to a great number of artists, including Jimmy Wright, and many of the Chicago Imagists, among them Barbara Grad, Paul Lamantia, David Sharpe, and Christina Ramberg.

== Works ==
Scamper by Ray Yoshida, 1997, oil on canvas, Honolulu Museum of Art

Yoshida created paintings in the early 1960s, and developed the "comic collage" in the later years of this decade. He also made paintings that incorporated elements from the comics. During the 1960s as well he began to build his personal collection of objects and images by self-taught and folk artists, installing these at his home. In the early 1970s, he created works which often featured abstracted objects; his work from the mid-1970s to 1980s incorporated a stronger figural sense. Yoshida returned to comic collage pieces in the 1990s and early 2000s, and produced a series of oil paintings in his late years. Scamper, in the collection of the Honolulu Museum of Art, is an example of the artist's comic collage paintings.

== Exhibitions ==
Yoshida had his first solo exhibition in 1960 at the Middle Hall Gallery in Rockford, Illinois. His work was shown along with the Imagists in the exhibition "Don Baum Sez ‘Chicago Needs Famous Artists" at the Museum of Contemporary Art in Chicago in 1969. From 1971 through the 1990s, his work was regularly shown at the Phyllis Kind Gallery in Chicago and New York City. A retrospective of Yoshida's art was held in 1998 at The Contemporary Museum, Honolulu (now the Honolulu Museum of Art Spalding House), the Chicago Cultural Center, and the Madison Art Center (now the Madison Museum of Contemporary Art) in Madison, Wisconsin. His last solo exhibition was in 1999 at the Adam Baumgold Gallery in New York.

After his death, a retrospective exhibition was held at the School of the Art Institute of Chicago's Sullivan Galleries ("Touch and Go: Ray Yoshida and His Spheres of Influence", which ran from Nov. 13, 2010 - Feb. 12, 2011). In 2013, the exhibition "Ray Yoshida's Museum of Extraordinary Values" at John Michael Kohler Art Center in Sheboygan Wisconsin, displayed Yoshida's personal collection of over 2600 objects and artworks which was donated to the Kohler Foundation after his death.

== Collections ==
The Art Institute of Chicago, Hawaii State Art Museum, Honolulu Museum of Art, Museum of Contemporary Art, Chicago, Smithsonian American Art Museum, and National Gallery of Art in Washington, DC, are among the public collections holding work by Ray Yoshida.

The papers of Ray Yoshida are now held at the Archives of American Art, part of the Smithsonian Institution.
