= Sarah Canright =

American painter

- Born: August 20, 1941 (age 84)
- Education: School of the Art Institute of Chicago (BFA)

Sarah Canright (born August 20, 1941) is an American painter.

Canright studied at the School of the Art Institute of Chicago, receiving a Bachelor's degree with a concentration in painting.

Her work is included in the collections of the Smithsonian American Art Museum, the Art Institute of Chicago, the Minneapolis Institute of Art and the Madison Museum of Contemporary Art.
