= Modern and Contemporary Art Research Initiative =

Art conservation research program

The Modern and Contemporary Art Research Initiative is a program started by the Getty Conservation Institute (GCI). It began in 2007 in response to the variety of new materials and technologies being used by contemporary artists in their work, and the lack of known conservation treatments for these new materials. This area was seen as a gap in the field of conservation, but also posed unique challenges when considering the intention of the artist and the physical aging that their materials might endure. According to Thomas F. Reese, "Conservators...must enter into the critical spirit of the works themselves if they are to save and transmit not merely decontextualized fragments but their essence to the future."

This program consists of various individual research projects that are looking to the conservation issue surrounding modern paints, plastics, and outdoor sculpture, among other areas as well. The Getty Conservation Institute works collaboratively with other cultural institutions and conservation institutes on these projects, and states its goal for the program as being to making "significant and lasting impact on the field in this area." The GCI is able to take on this project thanks to its role within the larger J. Paul Getty Trust - the Institute has access to its broader resources, and has the opportunity to choose projects that best serve its mission: "to advance conservation practice in the visual arts, including objects, collections, architecture and sites."

== Why research modern and contemporary art? ==
1. Because contemporary artists are now using a countless number of different materials, there is a need for research into how these materials will age and change with climate and temperature fluctuations. Since artists are constantly creating their work in new ways, research is required to keep up with determining treatment for all of these new materials.
2. Many artists today (and in the recent past) have used products that are commercially produced, and therefore, their formulas are carefully protected by the manufacturers. Conservators have a unique task in determining the nature of these materials, and also collecting samples to have available for when the product is no longer available. An example of this: house paint.
3. It has been determined that a number of modern materials are essentially unstable and show signs of deterioration much sooner than more traditional materials have. Some works have degraded so much that they are deemed worthy of storage only, and after a relatively short period of time. For this reason, there is a bit of a rush on figuring out how to best prevent this degradation, and to better track the changes that occur.
4. Time based media art: works of art that include electronics pose a particular challenge to conservators in that there is the impending threat that equipment or software will become obsolete. Conservators need to determine the best way to update the works of art to continue to make them viewable, while still maintaining the artist's intention for the work.
5. Many contemporary works of art are based more on a concept than on the physical object itself. Like the other challenges conservators are facing, this factor, more so than earlier works, forces the conservator to take the artist's intentions into account when determining the best course of treatment for a work.
6. Building off of the previous point, there is serious debate about whether or not the artist and/or the artist's estate should be included in conservation decisions. The issue poses ethical and legal implications, and the Getty has deemed this as a topic that needs further discussion and clarification.

== Main Goals of the Modern and Contemporary Art Research Initiative ==
According to the Getty Conservation Institute (GCI), those participating in this research initiative are intending to address the aforementioned concerns surrounding the conservation of modern and contemporary art in the following ways:

1. Conducting in-depth scientific studies into the synthetic materials being used today in an effort to better the understanding of how these modern materials behave.
2. Using a combination of scientific testing and critical assessment to develop and evaluate approaches to scientific conservation treatments.
3. Utilizing case studies that draw on collections of the collaborating institutions to gain a better understanding of the materials and methods of particular artists.
4. Organizing workshops for conservators to facilitate the transfer of scientific data into applicable conservation knowledge.
5. By organizing symposium meetings, debates, and publications, to continue the discussion on ethical and legal issues facing many conservators of contemporary art.
6. Using publications and web-based distribution, bettering the sharing of research ad information in this area with others in the field.

== Current major research projects ==
Though there are several challenges that face conservators with regard to modern and contemporary art, the CGI has focused its resources on three major areas that are in need of further research and information sharing. Because these materials and types of art objects are still rather new to the field, conservators have worked to identify the areas that require the most immediate attention. Currently, the three major projects focus on modern paints, plastics, and outdoor sculpture.

=== Modern Paints Project ===
The Modern Paints Project is a collaborative research project that began in response to the various new materials that contemporary artists are using in their work. Major collaborators include the Tate London, The National Gallery in Washington, DC, the Smithsonian Museum Conservation Institute, and several other international and domestic museums and cultural institutions. After 1920, cellulose nitrate was successfully converted into a form that could be used as a paint binder. Following this, the paints that artists were using were constantly changing and were composed of synthetic binders. While these various paints were utilized by several artists in the 20th century and up to the present day, the knowledge regarding how well any of these modern paints would withstand the passing of time is still extremely limited. Research is needed to determine the extent of the probable deterioration. In 2004, Thomas Learner, a senior conservation scientist at the Tate, London, published the findings of his research into the types of techniques currently being used to test and learn more about the synthetic resins and materials used in many modern commercial paints.

==== Goals ====
This project intends to increase in a significant and valuable way the amount of information available to conservators on modern paints, so that those working on objects of this sort are able to make informed decisions with regard to their treatments. This in-depth research will help conservators who study the techniques of modern painters. It also aims to assist them with determining the best storage and display conditions, and also contribute significantly to the development of safe and effective cleaning methods and other treatments. In order to do this, researchers monitor the behavior of actual art objects and conduct extensive analytical testing on materials.

==== Areas of focus ====
1. Assessment of analytical methods for modern paints: At the beginning of this project, there were very few methods established for identifying any of the components of modern paints, but by using several analytical techniques and scientific tests, conservators have been successful in being able to identify the binding agent, types of pigments, and additives in modern paints. Through this testing, the researchers have been able to select a number of testing techniques that are commonly used to make these identifications, giving them a better idea of how to move forward with future testing on objects.

2. Study of the physical and surface properties of modern paints: Because these paints are still being identified, their physical characteristics are still somewhat unknown. This area of the project intends to determine how the newer materials will respond to changes in temperature and relative humidity. The methods for measuring these properties in changing environments are thermal analysis, mechanical analysis, and surface characterization. The main challenge here, despite the fact that almost all of the materials used are completely new, is keeping track of the huge amount of variation between paints and their physical makeups.

3. Evaluation of cleaning methods for modern paintings: This main area of focus stems from the goal to develop an established method for cleaning modern paintings. Like the analysis of the environment responses, this area of focus consists of analytical testing to monitor any potential changes that could occur with cleaning treatments. The Tate London has worked closely with the Getty on each of these components of the project, but has played a leading role in this aspect in particular.

==== Preservation of Plastics Project ====
Like the Modern Paints Project, plastics are a new medium for conservators to deal with. The composition of the material is largely unknown, and the Preservation of Plastics project aims to help conservators understand why some plastics are more unstable than others. Research is required in this area because while degradation of plastics has been an ongoing issue in museums for several years, the main cause for concern is the rapid deterioration o the material with no obvious warning sign.

===== Goals =====
The main goal of this project is to develop strategies that improve the preservation and maintenance of objects in museum collections. Its aim is to coordinate scientific studies with the projects multiple collaborators to establish recommended practices for risks associated with handling these artifacts.

===== Areas of focus =====
The larger POPART project involves five steps:

1. Identification of polymer artifacts
2. Collection survey
3. Polymer degradation assessment
4. Conservation
5. Dissemination

The Getty Conservation Institute's project, the Preservation of Plastics, focuses specifically on coordinating the comparison of a wide range of analytical techniques for plastics identification and to participate in a details study into the physical and aging properties of a few key classes of polymer specifically. As with the Modern Paints project, if the conservators can learn more about these new materials being used, they can develop a procedure for how to treat them.

==== Outdoor Sculpture Research Project ====
This project stems from the recognition that outdoor sculpture is by nature particularly prone to damage but that research in this area was lacking. Conservation of outdoor painted sculpture works is especially challenging, given the uncontrolled, and often harsh, environments to which works are constantly exposed. Collaborators on the project took a step back and looked at current interests, needs, and practices in the conservation of modern and contemporary outdoor painted sculpture.

===== Goals =====
The goals of this project, according to the Getty Conservation Institute are as follows: • Facilitate dialogue between professionals involved in the conservation of outdoor painted sculpture (conservators, paint chemists, paint industry, artists' estates, foundations, and studios, curators, and caretakers). • Create guidelines for the production of paint swatches, for the documentation of paint surfaces (gloss, color and texture), and for the sharing of such information among those involved in the preservation of outdoor painted sculpture • Collaborate with artists', estates, foundations, and studios (EFS) to develop guidelines on original paint surfaces related to their respective artists and best practices for production of EFS-approved coupons. • Develop paints specifically formulated for the field, with improved durability and suitable working and optical properties in collaboration with the Army Research Laboratory and the paint industry, and in consultation with conservators and EFS • Explore the possibility of carrying out local retouching to increase the duration between costly and invasive stripping and repainting campaigns • Carry out a number of case studies on outdoor painted sculpture and sculpture parks to explore bridges between theory and practice

Over the long term the project seeks to build a repository of paint swatches documenting original paints and/or paints approved by EFS; to build bridges between industry and the conservation profession, and to disseminate the knowledge gained through courses and online publications.

===== Areas of Focus =====
1. Documenting original paint sources: Outdoor painted sculpture is unique in that the paint is an important visual element of the object itself, but the paint also serves as a protection to the metal substrate of the object. The paint layer can also work to prevent corrosion of the metal underneath. As a result, when the paint chips or peels off, the sculptures are often repainted to both improve their appearance and protect them from the elements that they are exposed to. This proves to be an issue when the sculpture is repainted an incorrect color or finish, whether intentionally or unintentionally, and the work is changed from its originally intended appearance. For this reason, documenting the original paint source for a contemporary outdoor sculpture is considered a main area of focus of this project - this would give the conservators something to refer back to before conducting any further treatments.

2. Analyzing and understanding paint composition: Much like the Modern Paints Project, the type of paints used on outdoor sculptures are mainly commercial produced automotive or industrial paints, meaning that the complete composition of the paint is usually unknown to the conservators. For this reason, conducting testing on the paints used has been deemed essential in figuring out how to best treat these types of works.

3. Developing new paint systems: Although good paints with excellent performance characteristics are commercially available, they may not match all the requirements necessary for conservation treatment. To address these issues the GCI has partnered with the Army Research Laboratory (ARL), which has been working to investigate new paint formulations suitable for conservation—the project builds off of previous work on matte black paints for Calder carried out by the ARL in collaboration with the National Gallery, Washington DC.

4. Collaborating with artists' estates, foundations, and studios: This area of focus is more of an ethical or philosophical discussion surrounding the involvement of artists' studios and estates in determining guidelines for repainting outdoor sculpture.

== Impact ==
From its launch, the Modern and Contemporary Art Research Initiative has taken an expansive approach to its research efforts regarding modern and contemporary works of art. While focusing on learning about the behaviors of new materials, specifically polymers, resins, plastics, modern paints, etc., the GCI has also considered how to best share its discoveries with conservators working in the field. Along with its several collaborators, the Getty Conservation Institute has organized several conferences to disseminate its findings and continue to discuss the questions and issues surrounding modern paints, plastics, and outdoor sculpture conservation. In addition to meetings such as the Modern Paints Uncovered Symposium, hosted by the Tate Modern in May 2006, and the Object in Transition Conference held in January 2008, those involved with each project publish their findings in the Getty Conservation Institute's newsletters, as well as other conservation publications.
