= Vera Berdich =

American printmaker

- Born: 1915; Cicero, Illinois, U.S.
- Died: October 12, 2003 (aged 87–88); Chicago, Illinois, U.S.
- Education: School of the Art Institute of Chicago (BFA)

Vera Berdich (1915 – October 12, 2003) was an American printmaker.

== Life ==
Berdich worked for the Works Progress Administration at Hull House. She graduated from the School of the Art Institute of Chicago with a B.A. in 1946 and taught etching there from 1947 to 1979. She was an influence on the Chicago Imagists group.

Berdich's papers are held at the Archives of American Art. She was also known under the names Veronica Berdich, Veronika Berdich and Veronica Berdick.

== Collections ==
Berdich's works are held in the collections of the Victoria and Albert Museum, the Seattle Art Museum, the Library of Congress, Smithsonian Institution, Museum of Modern Art, and the Art Institute of Chicago.

== Exhibitions ==
- 1995 "The Unquiet Eye: Vera Berdich, A Retrospective." Chicago Cultural Center
- 2008 "Twilight Shadows", Printworks Gallery
- 2010 "Chicago Stories: Prints and H. C. Westermann—See America First", Art Institute of Chicago
- 2010 "On & Of Paper: Selections from the Illinois State Museum Collection", Illinois State Museum Chicago Gallery
