= Jim Nutt =

American painter

- Born: November 28, 1938 (age 87); Chicago, Illinois, U.S.
- Education: School of the Art Institute of Chicago (BFA)

James T. Nutt (born November 28, 1938) is an American artist who was a founding member of the Chicago surrealist art movement known as the Chicago Imagists, or the Hairy Who. Though his work is inspired by the same pop culture that inspired Pop Art, journalist Web Behrens says Nutt's "paintings, particularly his later works, are more accomplished than those of the more celebrated Andy Warhol and Roy Lichtenstein." According to Museum of Contemporary Art curator Lynne Warren, Nutt is "the premier artist of his generation". Nutt attended the School of the Art Institute of Chicago, in Chicago, Illinois. He is married to fellow-artist and Hairy Who member Gladys Nilsson.

== Early life ==
I'm All A Twit, acrylic reverse painting on vinyl window shade with enamel on wood by Jim Nutt, 1969, Pennsylvania Academy of Fine Arts

Jim Nutt was born in 1938 in Pittsfield, Massachusetts. He attended college at the University of Kansas, then the University of Pennsylvania, then Washington University in St. Louis, then the School of the Art Institute of Chicago, where he met his future wife, fellow artist Gladys Nilsson.

== Art career ==
In 1963 Nilsson and Nutt were introduced to School of the Art Institute of Chicago art history professor Whitney Halstead, who became a teacher, mentor, and friend. He introduced them in turn to Don Baum, exhibition director at the Hyde Park Art Center in Chicago. In 1964 Nilsson and Nutt became youth instructors at the Hyde Park Art Center.

== Hairy Who ==
In 1964, Jim Nutt and Gladys Nilsson began to teach children's classes at the Hyde Park Art Center in Chicago. They and James Falconer approached the center's exhibitions director, Don Baum, with the idea of a group show consisting of the three of them and Art Green and Suellen Rocca. Baum agreed, and also suggested they include Karl Wirsum.

The name of the group show, "Hairy Who?", became the name of the group. It was coined by Karl Wirsum as a reference to WFMT art critic Harry Bouras. There were exhibitions at the Hyde Park Art Center in 1966, 1967, 1968, and 1969. The 1968 exhibition traveled to the San Francisco Art Institute, and the last show, in 1969, traveled to the Corcoran Gallery of Art in Washington, DC.

== Later career ==
In 1969, the influential Chicago gallery owner Phyllis Kind agreed to represent Nutt and Gladys Nilsson, giving both of them their first solo shows. In that same year Nutt and Nilsson moved to Sacramento, California, where he was an assistant professor of art at Sacramento State College.

In 1972 Walter Hopps, director of the Corcoran Gallery of Art, chose Nutt along with other artists to represent the United States at the 1972 Venice Biennial, and he was also included, along with a number of his Chicago colleagues, in the 1973 São Paulo Art Biennial.

In 1974 Nutt and his family returned to Chicago. They have lived in Wilmette since 1976.

Jim Nutt had his first solo show in 1974 at the Museum of Contemporary Art; it then traveled to the Walker Art Center and the Whitney Museum of American Art.

Nutt's current art dealer is the David Nolan Gallery, New York.

Jim Nutt exhibited a retrospective of his paintings, "Jim Nutt: Coming Into Character" at the Museum of Contemporary Art in Chicago from January 29 - May 29, 2011. In a catalogue essay accompanying this exhibition, painter Alexi Worth suggests that "what matters to Nutt are not real faces but our expectations of faces."

In 2022, Venus Over Manhattan exhibited "Jim Nutt: Portraits," showcasing rarely seen paintings and works on paper. This marked the first significant display of Nutt's work in New York in over a decade and his first solo gallery exhibition in the United States since the MCA Chicago's 2011 retrospective.

== Family life ==
In 1960, while attending the School of the Art Institute of Chicago, he met fellow student Gladys Nilsson. Nutt and Nilsson married in July 1961 in a chapel on the grounds of Northwestern University, and their son Claude was born in 1962.
