= Barbara Rossi (artist) =

American painter (1940–2023)

- Born: September 20, 1940; Chicago, Illinois, U.S.
- Died: August 24, 2023 (aged 82)
- Education: Saint Xavier University (BA); School of the Art Institute of Chicago (MFA)
- Style: Representational, cartoonish, meticulous
- Movement: Chicago Imagists
- Awards: National Endowment for the Arts Artist's Fellowship (1972)

Barbara Rossi (September 20, 1940 – August 24, 2023) was an American artist, one of the original Chicago Imagists, a group that in the 1960s and 1970s turned to representational art. She first exhibited with them at the Hyde Park Art Center in 1969. She is known for meticulously rendered drawings and cartoonish paintings, as well as a personal vernacular. She worked primarily by making reverse paintings on plexiglass that reference lowbrow and outsider art.

Rossi was a teacher at the School of the Art Institute of Chicago. Her works are exhibited in several permanent art museum collections.

== Life and career ==
Barbara Rossi was born in Chicago on September 20, 1940, and lived in Berwyn, Illinois. She received her Bachelor of Arts from St. Xavier College in 1964. Before pursuing her career as an artist, she spent several years as a Catholic nun.

Rossi's drawing style began to emerge in 1967, while she was taking a course at the School of the Art Institute of Chicago. She exhibited a drawing in the 1968 Annual Exhibition by Artists of Chicago and Vicinity at the Art Institute of Chicago, and later that year, she entered the Master of Fine Arts program at the School of the Art Institute of Chicago, graduating in 1970. While there, she met other Imagist artists, and was soon exhibiting her work alongside theirs. Rossi was awarded an artist's fellowship by the National Endowment for the Arts in 1972.

During the period of the mid-1960s to the mid-1970s, Rossi's art dealt with themes of abstracted and stylized inner bodily awareness, and the media she used included painting on plexiglass, small drawings in graphite and colored pencil, quilts and quilt pictures. This more internally-focused work shifted to a more external viewpoint in the late 1970s, when she began representing situational images and whole figures. By the late 1970s, she also employed other media, painting on masonite and occasionally canvas. In 1983, Rossi started traveling to India and making elaborate colored pencil drawings with Persian and Indian themes. Rossi curated a traveling exhibition about Indian art, From the Ocean of Painting: A Survey of India's Popular Painting Traditions, 1589 A.D. to the Present and wrote the accompanying catalog.

Rossi described her technique as "drawing without a predetermined end," intending her drawings to emerge one form at a time. Many people thought of Rossi's art as odd and grotesque, and most of her paintings appear to be body parts from the inside out, often looking like knobs or folds of skin. Ken Johnson calls her paintings "X-rays revealing subdermal viscera," which he suggests resemble "churning inner souls".

Rossi died on August 24, 2023, at the age of 82.

== Select exhibitions ==
- Barbara Rossi: Poor Traits. New Museum, New York (16 September 2015 - 3 January 2016)
- Meanwhile, in Lonesome Valley. Loudhailer Gallery, Los Angeles (20 June - 1 August 2015). Group exhibit.
- Barbara Rossi (21 April - 4 June 1995) Tarble Arts Center, Eastern Illinois University
- Barbara Rossi: Selected Works, 1967-1990 (13 January - 24 February 1991) Renaissance Society, University of Chicago
- Some Recent Art from Chicago. University of North Carolina at Chapel Hill (10 February - 2 March 1980). Group exhibit. Works exhibited: Viking Smoking (1970), Shep and Poor-Self Trait, (1970), Curls and Poor-Self Trait (1970), Quilt (Male of Sorrows) (1971), 3-D Do (1973)
- Who Chicago? an exhibition of contemporary imagists. London (10 December - 25 January 1981). Group exhibit. Works exhibited: Poor Self Trait 3 (Curls) Diptych (1970), 3-D Do (1973, Shep Step II (1973), Fishing Picture (1975), Quick-n-Quack (1975), A Bark Drawing (1976), Waveland (1977), De Risen (1978)
- XII Bienal de São Paulo: Made In Chicago (1973–74) Museu de Arte, São Paulo, Brazil
- Twenty-Fourth Illinois Invitational Exhibition (1971) Illinois State Museum, Springfield, IL
- Seventy-First Annual Exhibition by Artists of Chicago and Vicinity (30 March - 12 May 1968) Art Institute of Chicago

== Select permanent collections ==
- Art Institute of Chicago
- Madison Museum of Contemporary Art, Wisconsin
- Milwaukee Art Museum, Wisconsin
- Museum of Contemporary Art, Chicago
- Museum of Modern Art, Vienna
- David and Alfred Smart Museum, the University of Chicago
- Smithsonian American Art Museum, Washington, D.C.
