= Karl Wirsum =

American artist (1939–2021)

- Born: 1939; Chicago, Illinois, U.S.
- Died: May 6, 2021 (aged 81); Chicago, Illinois, U.S.
- Education: School of the Art Institute of Chicago (BFA)
- Spouse: Lorri Gunn (m. 1968)
- Children: 2

Karl Wirsum (1939 – May 6, 2021) was an American artist. He was a member of the Chicago artistic group The Hairy Who, and helped set the foundation for Chicago's art scene in the 1970s. Although he was primarily a painter, he also worked with prints, sculpture, and even digital art.

== Early life ==
Wirsum was born in Chicago in 1939. He took up drawing at the age of five, while he was recuperating in hospital over several weeks from a fractured skull. Both his parents died when he was nine years old, after their vehicle collided with a truck; Wirsum escaped unhurt. He attended the School of the Art Institute of Chicago (SAIC) on scholarship starting in 1957, obtaining a Bachelor of Fine Arts four years later. After graduating, he traveled to Mexico, where he met up with Ed Paschke and Bert Geer Phillips.

== Career ==
Wirsum was a member of The Hairy Who (along with James Falconer, Art Green, Gladys Nilsson, Jim Nutt, and Suellen Rocca). This group came to be known by the exhibition title of the same name, which was co-curated by Don Baum at the Hyde Park Art Center in 1966, and for which the group received national attention. Wirsum initially was not part of the group until Baum made him a part of the exhibition. He ultimately provided the group its name when he asked, "Harry who?" in response to Harry Bouras' name being brought up in a discussion. Subsequent shows followed in 1967 and in 1968, of which the latter went from the Hyde Park Art Center to the San Francisco Art Institute. During the winter of 1968–69, there was a Hairy Who drawing show at the School of Visual Arts in New York City. The final Hairy Who show took place the following spring at the Corcoran Gallery of Art, Dupont Center in Washington, D.C.

By the early 1970s, several Hairy Who artists came to be known as Chicago Imagists, a name for which critic Franz Schulze is credited for having developed. This "group" expanded to include Ed Paschke, Roger Brown and Barbara Rossi, among others. The group diverged from The Hairy Who in that they did not appropriate subject matter. Wirsum later recounted how he felt that "they were staying too close to the initial point of inspiration", adding how he preferred "things that were more inventive".

During the early 1970s, Wirsum taught at the Sacramento State College, the only time he resided outside of Chicago. In his later years, he worked as an adjunct professor and professor of painting and drawing at the SAIC (his alma mater). He was granted an honorary doctorate by the SAIC in 2016, along with the other members of The Hairy Who.

== Personal life ==
Wirsum was married to Lorri Gunn Wirsum for 53 years until his death. Together, they had two children: Zack and Ruby. He survived multiple strokes that compromised the mobility of his hand.

Wirsum died of cardiac arrest on May 6, 2021, at Advocate Illinois Masonic Medical Center in Lake View, Chicago, at the age of 81.

== Selected collections ==
- Art Institute of Chicago, Chicago, Illinois
- Chazen Museum of Art, Madison, Wisconsin
- The Illinois Collection for the State of Illinois Center, Chicago, Illinois
- Madison Museum of Contemporary Art
- Museum of Contemporary Art, Chicago, Illinois
- Museum des 20, Jahrhunderts, Vienna
- National Museum of American Art, Smithsonian Institution, Washington D.C.
- Northern Illinois University, Dekalb, Illinois
- David and Alfred Smart Gallery, University of Chicago, Chicago, Illinois
- Whitney Museum of American Art, New York, New York
- Union League Club of Chicago, Chicago, Illinois
