= Suellen Rocca =

American artist (1943–2020)

- Rocca in 1967
- Born: Suellen Krupp; October 2, 1943; Chicago, Illinois, U.S.
- Died: March 26, 2020 (aged 76); Naperville, Illinois, U.S.
- Education: School of the Art Institute of Chicago (BFA)
- Spouse: Dennis Rocca (m. 1962; div. 1975)

Suellen Rocca (née Krupp; October 2, 1943 – March 26, 2020) was an American artist, one of the original Chicago Imagists, a group in the 1960s and 1970s who turned to representational art. She exhibited with them at the Hyde Park Art Center from 1966 through 1969. She was curator of the art collection and director of exhibitions at Elmhurst College.

== Biography ==
Suellen Krupp was born in 1943 and grew up in a middle-class, Jewish family. She began attending classes at the Art Institute of Chicago when she was in elementary school and knew she wanted to be an artist from the age of eight. She married her husband, Dennis Rocca, in 1962. He brought home jewelry catalogues that informed Rocca's artistic style.

After her work with The Hairy Who starting in 1965, Rocca had two children and continued her work as an artist. In 1970, she took a decade away from making art. In 2015 she returned to the art world with her exhibition at the Matthew Marks Gallery in New York City.

Rocco was a professor of painting, design, and drawing at Elmhurst College for 18 years. She was the director of the Art Exhibition and Visiting Artist Program, and the curator and director of exhibitions.

Her image is included in the iconic 1972 poster Some Living American Women Artists by Mary Beth Edelson.

Rocca died on March 26, 2020, from pancreatic cancer.

== Education ==
In 1960, at age 16, she began college at the School of the Art Institute of Chicago. There, she was heavily influenced by Whitney Halsted and Ray Yoshida. In 1964, she received her BFA from SAIC with a major in painting and a minor in print-making.

== Work and exhibitions ==
Following graduation, she joined The Hairy Who, one of the groups of artists that made up the Chicago Imagists.

Rocca's work is a mix of media and is influenced by her life experiences and interests. In an article from the Art Institute of Chicago's website on the artist they describe her art with the Hairy Who and individually, "During the Hairy Who years, Rocca’s visual vocabulary expressed her personal taste as much as her experiences as a newlywed and young mother. She employed signs and symbols drawn from everything from the rebus-like pictograms in kindergarten reading primers to the jewelry trade catalogs in her husband’s family’s store. Often characterized as “picture writing,” Rocca's work maintains a sense of immediacy. In both its grid-like arrangements of repetitive glyphs punctuated by onomatopoeic words such as ohh, ahh, and eek, and the centrally located imagery framed by decorative borders, Rocca's intuitive and nebulous compositions stand apart from other Hairy Who work."

In 2015, Rocca's work was displayed in New York City at Matthew Marks Gallery, her first New York show in over 20 years. The show featured Rocca's works made between 1965 and 1969.

In 2018 the Art Institute of Chicago organized an exhibit entitled Hairy Who? 1966-1969 on the Hairy Who in which Suellen Rocca is included.

The exhibition Suellen Rocca Drawings at the Matthew Marks Gallery in New York City displayed drawings made from 1980 to 2018 and ran from September 14, to October 27, 2018.

Rocca was the curator for the exhibition The Figure and the Chicago Imagists: Selections from the Elmhurst College Art Collection at the Elmhurst Art Museum which ran September 8-January 13, 2019.

Rocca's work appeared in the Minneapolis Institute of Art, the Matthew Marks Gallery, The Art Institute of Chicago, and various traveling shows.
