= Whitney Halstead =

American art historian (1926–1979)

- Born: 1926
- Died: 1979 (aged 52–53)
- Education: School of the Art Institute of Chicago (BFA, MFA)

Whitney Halstead (1926 - 1979) was an American art historian, and artist.

He graduated from the School of the Art Institute of Chicago with a B.F.A and M.F.A. He taught art history at the School of the Art Institute of Chicago. His papers are held at the Archives of American Art.

Halstead was the primary supporter of the work of Joseph Yoakum and has been noted as an influential teacher by many of the Chicago Imagists and painters Barbara Grad, Paul Lamantia and David Sharpe. He had participated in the 1965 Art Institute's faculty strike. He became the Chairman of the Division of Fine Arts in 1967, and in 1970 he became the Graduate Advisor. He also wrote for Artforum and the Chicago Daily News.
