= Carole Harmel =

American artist and photographer

- Born: 1945 (age 80–81); Washington, D.C., U.S.
- Education: Smith College (attended); Antioch College (BA); School of the Art Institute of Chicago (MFA); Northwestern University (PhD)
- Style: Surrealism
- Spouse: Arthur Lerner
- Website: Official website

Carole Harmel (born 1945) is an American artist and photographer, who gained recognition for her provocative images of nudes in the 1970s and 1980s and still lifes combining photography with short narratives, wordplay and mixed media. Fundamental to Harmel's work is a questioning of reality and photographic conventions, a penchant for surrealism, and humor. The New Art Examiner described her nudes as having a "startling, queasy impact," "rich in ambiguity, discomforting in content." About her still lifes, critic Michael Weinstein wrote, "sophisticated academic criticism is fused with love of color and visual form to create images at once conceptually engaging and perceptually arresting."

Harmel played a key role in the development of the pioneering women's cooperative in Chicago, Artemisia Gallery, as an early member and co-founder of its influential photography gallery. Her work has been featured extensively in the New Art Examiner, Chicago Sun-Times, Chicago Tribune, Artforum, and Midwest Art, and is held in corporate and private collections, including the Art Institute of Chicago, the Museum of Contemporary Art, Chicago, the Mary and Leigh Block Museum of Art, Wellesley College, and the Illinois State Museum. In addition to her artistic practice, Harmel has worked as an art critic and educator.

Carole Harmel, Masks, original toned vintage gelatin print, 5" x 7", 1973. Prizewinner in 1973 Art Institute of Chicago "Chicago & Vicinity Show."

== Education and career ==
Carole Harmel was born in Washington, DC. She began college as an English literature major at Smith College, but gravitated to art and transferred to Antioch College in Ohio, for its freer atmosphere. After earning a BA in Art (1969), she continued on to graduate school at the School of the Art Institute of Chicago (SAIC), where she studied under renowned photographers Barbara Crane, Ken Josephson, Frank Barsotti, and Harold Allen. From the beginning, Harmel pushed against the traditional confines of the medium's aesthetics, materials and subject matter.

After earning an MFA in Photography from SAIC (1972), Harmel began teaching at City Colleges of Chicago and became active in Chicago's burgeoning art scene. She exhibited at the alternative N.A.M.E. Gallery, the Art Institute (AIC), and the women's cooperative Artemisia Gallery. Her work won a prize at the 1973 AIC "Chicago and Vicinity Show" (for Masks, 1973), appeared in Heresies, and drew both critical attention and controversy. At Artemisia, she co-founded its photography gallery with Carol Turchan and Jane Wenger, and helped spur the collective's rise to recognition with artists such as Margaret Wharton, Hollis Sigler, Barbara Grad and Vera Klement; in the 1974 "Chicago and Vicinity Show," gallery members (including Harmel) accounted for more than one-tenth of all the artists chosen.

In 1979, Harmel began film studies at Northwestern University with professors Paddy Whannel, Stuart Kaminsky and Chuck Kleinhans, completing a PhD in 1982. During that time, she wrote about photography for the publications New Art Examiner, Exposure, and Afterimage.

Over the past four-plus decades, Harmel has shown in solo exhibitions at Antioch College, Artemisia, Intuitive Eye Gallery (Washington, DC), FOTO (New York City), Zriny-Hayes, Stuart Wilbur (both Chicago), and Printworks Gallery (Chicago), which has represented her work since 1990. During much of that time (1972–2007), she has also been an educator at City Colleges of Chicago. Harmel continues to work and live in Chicago, with her husband, artist Arthur Lerner. Their daughter, Alexandra, is also an artist and art teacher.

Carole Harmel, Old Dresses series, silver gelatin print, 10" x 10", 1973.

== Work ==
Three things underlie much of Harmel's work: a desire to challenge photographic "reality" and logic, her interest in surrealism, and humor that varies from playful to disquieting. Her work divides into three major bodies: nudes (1972–1984); still lifes often involving narrative (1984–1998); and collaborative works (2009—).

=== Nudes ===
Harmel quickly gained recognition for her nudes, which were described as provocative, compelling and disturbing in their suggestion and psychological acuity, and deft in the use of color, texture and composition. In them, she sought to disrupt photography's status as a record of reality, in order to access "expression of an inner, more surreal existence." She incorporated masks, makeup, costumes and other props that confuse, contradict or obscure the human and sexual reality of her figures, as well as techniques like solarization and toning to further remove the images from objective reality. Writer Joanna Frueh described the work as both aggressively sexual and absurd, and observed that Harmel's compositions and eerie coloring seemed to trap subjects "in a twilight zone somewhere between everyday life and dreams—or nightmares—come true."

Critics such as Frueh and Dick Jeske found that Harmel's unexpected juxtapositions—of bodies, props, theatrical settings, and spatial or conceptual references (front/back, female/male)—multiplied the uncanny expressive possibilities in her images. Jeske suggested that her work revealed submerged psychological aspects in everyday subjects, evoking a "mythological but simultaneously contemporary world" or emergent "gods and goddesses" he found haunting or menacing. In her pastel-toned Old Dresses series (1980), objects came to the fore. Placing antique garments in ambiguous relationships to nude figures, she created antitheses—fabric/skin, fronts/backs, female garments/male nudes, sight/touch—that writer Candida Finkel said carried a surreal, erotic charge as the dresses, though disembodied, continued to conjure humanness.

Carole Harmel, Bird series, hand colored B&W silver gelatin print, 10" x 10", 1983.

In the Cocteau-influenced Bird series (1983), Harmel used framing to fragment and abstract her explorations of the "Leda and the Swan" myth in tightly cropped, voyeuristic images of a nude female and an undefinable birdlike creature hinting at intimacy. Critic Devonna Pieszak wrote that the images' simultaneous evocation of bestial/tender and fascinating/repulsive "reclaim for sexuality the mysterious anxieties and anticipations contemporary explicitness eliminates."

Reception of the work was not without controversy. Joanna Frueh wrote, "You can't view Carole Harmel's photographs with indifference. When gallery-goers walked into Artemisia for her 1974 show, they left immediately or lingered to let seep in what rattled the less voyeuristic." In 1978, Harmel and Liz Fruzyna presented their collaborative nude, frontal Portraits of Men. Finkel called them "the feminist answer to the male power trip which the female-nude-as-art-form has been," noting their classic form, composition and elegant tonality referenced historical nudes including Weston's and Bullock's photographs of women.

=== Still lifes and narrative works ===
In 1984, Harmel began creating still life series that retained a surrealist edge recalling Magritte and Duane Michals, but employed word and visual play, color (post—1986), and narrative, reflecting her film studies experience. She continued to question photographic reality through disassociations, unusual juxtapositions—and now puns—in works she called more "poetry than prose."

Carole Harmel, Not a Bed of Strawberries, archival ink jet, 5" x 7", 1994.

In her Natural Disasters series (1984–1993), Harmel created small stage sets where the relationship between the internal space of a photograph and the external world of its setting were fluid; in sequential images, the sets are invaded by elements such as flowers, fruit or stripes that escape a painting, photograph or still life in the set. These elements often allude to the relationship between art and reality, with nature no longer a passive subject, but an active agent. Train of Thought (1993), created for the Illinois State Museum, features a sequence that references Magritte's Time Transfixed, in which a photographed playground train leaves its picture on the wall, becomes three-dimensional, and enters the space of the room.

The Light Writings series (1991–1996) was Inspired by Harmel's PhD research. Here she juxtaposed the idea of photography as "writing" on film with light, actual writing on photographs, and wordplay such as homonyms, in sequences like Berried, in which a chair is gradually buried in strawberries. In this series, Michael Weinstein observed "Harmel is at her best when she is a not-so-merry prankster … acknowledging the slings and arrows of fate and redeeming them with wit," and cited the sequence, Not a bed of roses (1994) as a model.

=== Collaborative work ===
Carole Harmel and Lialia Kuchma, A Creature/Ecriture, archival ink jet and thread, 8.5 x 17.7, 2013.

In the 2000s, Harmel's work took an increasingly collaborative turn. She worked with her husband, painter Arthur Lerner, on her "Facing Modigliani" series (2009), to create portraits of Chicago artists which Lerner painted in the style of Modigliani over images that Harmel shot of each person. In "Chicago Odyssey" (2011), she reached back to her beginnings as an undergrad lit major to co-create What Weinstein called "boldly rollicking" works replete with pathos and wit, in which artists cast themselves as characters in Homer's classic and then worked into portraits Harmel took of them. She followed with "Another Iliad" (2016), which invited artists to paint, draw and collage over photographs she took on the site of Troy.

"Chicago Odyssey" instigated another collaboration, "Re-Woven" (2013), with Harmel's one-time Artemisia co-member Lialia Kuchma. Kuchma cast herself as Penelope in the "Odyssey" series, and put her weaving skills to use in her contribution. That inspired new works, incorporating French and English language puns (e.g., A Creature/Ecriture or Fin/Fin) and a larger narrative on the stations of life, in which Kuchma cut Harmel's prints into strips and re-wove them, drawing a "net" over the image. In 2018, Harmel created another collaborative series, "A Clowder of Cats," in which her cat, Mica, "enters" the works of 22 Chicago artists.

== Writing and teaching ==
From 1979 to 1982, Harmel wrote about photography and film as a contributing editor for the New Art Examiner and Exposure, and as Chicago correspondent for Afterimage. Her contributions included reviews on André Kertész, Wynn Bullock, contemporaries Keith Smith, Jane Wenger, Joseph Jachna and Harold Allen, and major exhibits. Her New Art Examiner essay "The Word vs. the Image – some thoughts on reading photography" was republished in The Essential New Art Examiner anthology (2011) and singled out in Donald Kuspit's review of the book as notable. The essay examined the word/image relationship through the lens of theoretician Minor White's work on reading photographs and the emerging field of semiology, which related to Harmel's PhD research.

Harmel's teaching career began in 1972 at Richard J. Daley College. The following year, she transferred to Harry S. Truman College, where she would teach film, photography, art history and other subjects, including ceramics, to a diverse student body until retiring in 2007. She received the Distinguished Professor Award there in 1999 and served as Chairperson of Department of Art and Foreign Languages (1992–2004).

== Collections and recognition ==
Harmel's work is held in numerous public and private collections, including those of: Museum of Contemporary Art in Chicago, Illinois State Museum, Mary and Leigh Block Museum of Art, State of Illinois Building, Taubman Museum of Art, Wellesley College, Kemper Insurance, Lake Shore Bank, Container Corporation, Muriel Newman, and Dennis Adrian. She has been awarded the Chicago Society of Artists' Prize (1973), a Polavision Grant (1977), an Illinois State Museum Purchase Prize (1985), and an Illinois Arts Council Grant (1986), among others.
