= Barbara Grad =

American artist and educator (born 1950)

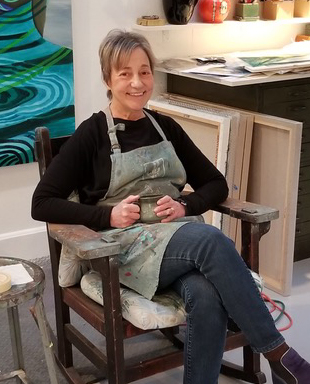
- Grad in 2017
- Born: 1950 (age 75–76); Chicago, Illinois, U.S.
- Education: School of the Art Institute of Chicago (BFA, MFA)
- Style: Organic abstraction
- Website: Official website

Barbara Grad (born 1950) is an American artist and educator, known for abstract, fractured landscape paintings, which combine organic and geometric forms, colliding planes and patterns, and multiple perspectives. Her work's themes include the instability of experience, the ephemerality of nature, and the complexity of navigating cultural environments in flux. While best known as a painter, Grad also produces drawings, prints, mixed-media works and artist books. She has exhibited in venues including the Art Institute of Chicago, Kemper Museum of Contemporary Art, Danforth Art, Rose Art Museum, Indianapolis Museum of Art and A.I.R., and been reviewed in publications, including Artforum, Arts Magazine and ARTnews. Grad co-founded Artemisia Gallery, one the country's first women-artist collectives, in Chicago in 1973. She has been an educator for over four decades, most notably at the Massachusetts College of Art and Design. Grad has been based in the Boston area since 1987.

Grad's work is noted for its loose, painterly invented spaces, lush color, and ability to conjure wide-ranging allusions to land and seascapes, urban sprawl, or ecological concerns. In 2018, critic John Yau wrote that Grad's "patterns and striations evoke watery reflections and geological strata, tilled land and strip mines, without shedding their identity as abstract, painterly marks. […] She evokes a world undergoing myriad changes, from the incremental and unavoidable to the deliberate and cataclysmic." Describing the 2016 Grad show "Off Road," The Boston Globe's Cate McQuaid observed, "Grad paints energy and movement, not things. [Her] stripes, colors, and crashing forms conveying urgency as she places us on the precipice of chaos."

== Life and career ==
Grad was born Barbara Janet Horwitz in Chicago, Illinois in 1950. She studied painting, as well as photography, drawing, printmaking and art history, at the School of the Art Institute of Chicago; artist and painter Ray Yoshida and art historian Whitney Halstead were strong influences. In 1972, she completed her BFA and married Sheldon Grad (divorced, 1973); she earned an MFA there in 1975. While in school, Grad exhibited at the Artemisia, Allan Frumkin and Nancy Lurie galleries, and in the Art Institute of Chicago's prestigious "Artists of Chicago and Vicinity" shows (1973, 1975). She also began teaching part-time at the Illinois Institute of Technology (1974).

Barbara Grad, Trails, oil on canvas, 72" x 48", 1978.

In 1976, Grad took a full-time teaching position at Ball State University in Muncie, Indiana. When she tired of small-town life in 1979, she moved into a cheap loft in the "flower district" on the outskirts of current-day Chelsea in New York City, continuing to exhibit in Chicago and nationally. In 1981, she joined the full-time faculty at the Massachusetts College of Art and Design, where she remained until retiring as professor emerita in 2015. She commuted from New York until 1987, when she moved to Boston and married Peter Allen; three years later their son, Samuel, was born. In subsequent decades, Grad has had notable solo exhibitions at the Kemper Museum of Contemporary Art, Danforth Art, the Bernard Toale, Howard Yezerski and Miller Yezerski galleries (Boston), and Findlay Galleries (New York and Palm Beach). Grad lives with her husband and works in Wayland, Massachusetts, outside of Boston.

== Work and reception ==
Grad emerged amid a period of intense artistic activity in Chicago in the early 1970s, alongside new gallery districts, critical voices, alternative art spaces, and the Chicago Imagists. She credits that time, and teachers like Yoshida, with sparking her interest in Outsider artists with a personal vision, such as Joseph Yoakum and Lee Godie, who continue to influence her. Grad incorporated those influences alongside modernists like Kandinsky, Paul Klee, Georges Braque, and Bay Area Painters such as David Park. She generally rejects explicit imagery in favor of invented spaces that she creates with paint and color, which serve as metaphors for the complexity and instability of experience, culture and the environment.

=== Early work ===
Grad is often highly influenced by her environment. For a three-year period in the late 1970s, she commuted from Indiana to Chicago in a small plane, drawing aerial views on the trips. The imagery found its way into her work—and continues to—in ribbon-like bands of modulated color and patterning that suggested landscapes and plant forms, which she sometimes combined with geometric shapes, as in the painting, Trails (1978). This work, which she exhibited at Artemisia and Jan Cicero Gallery, included paintings and mixed-media pieces that sometimes incorporated weaving. After moving to New York in 1979, Grad began explored imagery from her new surroundings—cityscapes, street life, pinball machines, the figure—in more representational paintings that she exhibited at 55 Mercer Gallery in New York and Jan Cicero in Chicago.

Barbara Grad, Fruit of the Vine, oil on linen, 48" x 72", 1996.

=== Abstractions of nature ===
In the 1980s and 1990s, Grad returned to nature, and eventually, abstraction, influenced by her commutes to Boston and move to more pastoral Wayland, Massachusetts in 1991. Art historian Bonnie Grad (no relation) wrote that this new work "transports viewers to a primordial natural world of incipient becoming." Her first solo exhibition in Boston (Bernard Toale, 1996) was a synthesis of her travel and nature experiences and her sophisticated integration of abstraction and referential imagery. These new paintings, such as Fruit of the Vine (1996), employed autumnal washes of loose, patchwork grids that formed fractured, Cubist pictorial spaces, onto which she layered lyrical, rhythmic plays of biomorphic shapes, resembling seeds, pods, ferns or branches about to blossom or fruit. She unified the compositions by overlaying heavy, map-like white and black line work suggesting tendrils, vessels and honeycombs, which brought the organic forms into focus.

Critics noted the work's lush depths and handling of paint, which appeared both spontaneous and controlled. Artforum's, Francine Koslow-Miller compared the "primitive stylizations and pictographic lines" to the work of Adolph Gottlieb. Nancy Stapen of ARTnews wrote that the work recalled the "circular, fertile forms" of Lee Krasner and "the lyricism of Arthur Dove and the impassioned vision of Marsden Hartley," but marked Grad's shift in emphasis from modernist essential forms to fleeting depictions of air, light, the passing of seasons, and "nature's ceaseless flux."

=== Drawings and mixed media series ===
Grad has produced drawings, prints and mixed media art throughout her career. Her drawing exhibition at Bernard Toale (2000) featured painterly watercolor and ink works on mylar and paper, that mixed text, abstract shapes and a detailed, "secret" visual language reminiscent of Klee or Miró. Cate McQuaid called it "meaty, satisfying work" that unpeeled like onion skins to reveal layers of subtle, translucent organic forms and ideas involving spirituality and consciousness; others described the pieces as challenging "koans" enacting an uneasy truce of nature and geometry. In the Boston Center for the Arts traveling group show "Standing on One Leg" (2005–8), Grad exhibited mixed-media works, such as Balancing Balls (2005), and incised etchings on plexiglass. The etchings, which featured diagrammatic drawings of human figures, architecture and hieroglyphics, were placed off the wall, creating a subtle play of ephemeral line and shadows. Critics and curators described the explorations of primal myths, belief systems and the body's relation to the cosmos as playful, clever and intriguing.

Grad has also produced more than seventy artist books. In 1996, she exhibited the "Origins" series, which features small "dreamscapes" that unfold in accordion formats, echoing the layered abstraction of her paintings. Between 2002 and 2004, she created a socially oriented series of books, including Random Data and Enemy Territory (made as America entered the Iraq War), that incorporated abstract heads and figures, text, numbers, and diverse forms and materials such as eggshells and boots.

Barbara Grad, Plan B, oil on linen, 94" x 60", 2011.

=== Abstract landscapes ===
Grad's later paintings have grown more dizzying, disorienting, dense, and expansive in their themes, which reference topography, maps, city grids and borders, the built environment, ecology, and the layering of cultures, one upon or next to another (e.g., Erosion, 2008; Greenspace, 2009; Re-Build, 2012). Critics describe works such as Plan B (2011) as "fabricated from a virtual reality high in the sky," "far outside reality," yet convincingly real. They situate them alongside cultural representations such as the Nazca Lines of Peru, Serpent Mound in Ohio, or crop circles reflecting the "ancestral need to take a bird's-eye view, the better to locate oneself on the planet."

Grad has described her later work (e.g., Salt Air, 2018) in terms of collisions—of colors, forms, patterns, perspectives and meanings—a notion reinforced in her multi-canvas works, which abut different-sized painted panels to create a sense of unstable, disjointed perimeters. John Yau relates Grad's carefully developed, "splintered pictorial space" and ability to maintain a continuous tension between defined sections and the overall image to the abstract landscapes of Richard Diebenkorn. Others cite the tangled abstractions of Terry Winters, but note in Grad's flitting between the tangible and evanescent, a greater emotional register that expresses the difficulty of navigating complex communication, geographic and psychological divides.

Barbara Grad, Salt Air, oil on linen, 108" x 60", 2018.

== Artemisia Gallery ==
In 1973, Grad was one of five women artists, including Joy Poe (her studio mate), Phyllis McDonald, Emily Pinkowski and Margaret Wharton, who started the women's collaborative Artemisia Gallery in Chicago, named after the pioneering 17th-century female artist Artemisia Gentileschi. It was one of the first in the U.S., after A.I.R. in New York. The idea for the collective, initially Poe's, took shape when the five women visited the studios of 150 women artists in Chicago, and then gathered a large group to select twenty founding members who would show in revolving, two-person exhibits. That larger group also included Carole Harmel, Vera Klement, Linda Kramer, Susan Michod, and Alice Shaddle. The gallery opened in September 1973, in the center of Chicago's art scene near the new Museum of Contemporary Art, and was joined by a second women's collective, ARC Gallery; together they sought to challenge the notion that women artists were dilettantes by offering a professional venue equal to the city's commercial galleries. The following year, the New Art Examiner described the Art Institute of Chicago "Chicago and Vicinity Show," as "a triumph" for Artemisia, as its members (including Grad) accounted for more than one-tenth of all the artists chosen. Grad was a member and regular exhibitor at Artemisia until 1977. Artemisia Gallery remained in operation for 30 years, showing innovative work from Chicago and the world, according to Museum of Contemporary Art curator Lynne Warren, before closing in 2003.

== Career in education ==
Grad began a four-decade career in education in 1974, while still in graduate school, teaching art part time at the Illinois Institute of Technology and Triton College. In 1976, she was a visiting artist and instructor at Carnegie Mellon University, before taking a tenured-track position in the fall at Ball State University in Muncie, Indiana. After moving to New York, Grad joined the full-time faculty as a professor at the Massachusetts College of Art and Design (MassArt) in 1981. She was the first woman to hold a tenure-track, full-time position teaching painting in MassArt's Fine Arts 2D Department. Grad taught advanced drawing, painting, and an "Art in Boston" course that took students to local galleries and artist studios. She also served as the department's Chairman (1997–2000) and Painting Coordinator (2011–2014). Grad retired as professor emerita in 2015.

== Collections and recognition ==
Grad's work has been acquired by numerous public and private collections, including those of the Art Institute of Chicago, Kemper Museum of Contemporary Art, Danforth Art, Ballinglen Foundation (Ireland), Polaroid 20x24 International Collection, Koehnline Museum of Art, and Massachusetts College of Art and Design, among others. Her work has been recognized with awards from the Artist's Resource Trust Fund of the Berkshire Taconic Community Foundation (2013, 2005), New England for the Arts (1996), Massachusetts Council on the Arts and Humanities Fellow (1985), National Endowment for the Arts (1975), and George D. & Isabella A. Brown Fellowship, Art Institute of Chicago (1975, 1972). She has been awarded artist residencies from Jentel Arts (2012), Ballinglen Arts Foundation (2011), and the Kalani Honua Artists Retreat Center (1987).
