= Corey Postiglione =

American painter (born 1942)

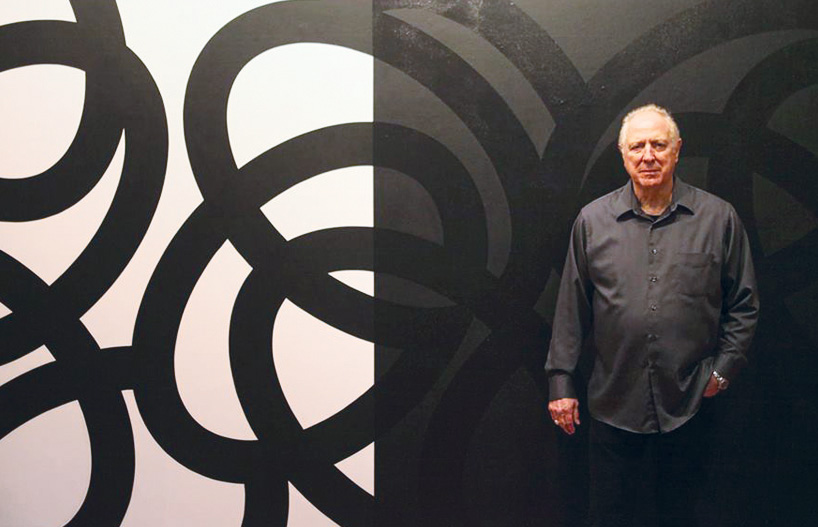
- Corey Postiglione, Population 5
- Born: 1942 (age 83–84); Chicago, Illinois, US
- Education: School of the Art Institute of Chicago, University of Illinois at Chicago
- Known for: Painting & Drawing
- Style: Abstraction, Minimalism
- Movement: Postmodernism, Modernism
- Spouse: Kathie Shaw
- Website: coreypostiglione.com

Corey Postiglione (born 1942) is an American artist, art critic and educator. He is a member of the American Abstract Artists in New York, and known for precise, often minimalist work that "both spans and explores the collective passage from modernism to postmodernism" in contemporary art practice and theory. New Art Examiner co-founder Jane Allen, writing in 1976, described him as "an important influence on the development of contemporary Chicago abstraction." In 2008, Chicago Tribune art critic Alan G. Artner wrote "Postiglione has created a strong, consistent body of work that developed in cycles, now edging closer to representation, now moving further away, but remaining rigorous in approach to form as well as seductive in mark-making and color."

Corey Postiglione, Tango Interlude #25, acrylic on canvas, 60 x 60 inches, 2016.

== Life ==
Born into a working-class, Italian-American family on the north side of Chicago, Postiglione first developed an interest in art at Lane Tech High School. After serving in the U.S. Marine Corps and working a series of blue-collar jobs, he attended the University of Illinois at Chicago, graduating with a BFA in studio arts in 1971. He became active in a burgeoning art scene in Chicago, first exhibiting his work at Richard Gray Gallery, N.A.M.E., and Jan Cicero Gallery, and writing articles and reviews for the newly formed New Art Examiner. In 1990, he earned an MA in 20th-century art history, theory and criticism from the School of the Art Institute of Chicago, studying under the postmodernist art critic Craig Owens, among others.

Postiglione has exhibited internationally, at colleges, universities, and venues such as The Art Institute of Chicago, Chicago Cultural Center, OK Harris Gallery and the Hyde Park Art Center. He received retrospective exhibitions at the Evanston Art Center in 2008 and Koehnline Museum of Art in 2010. His artwork has been reviewed in publications including Artforum, New Art Examiner, the Chicago Tribune, and Chicago Daily News, and is included in private and public collections, including the permanent collections of Purdue University Galleries and the Koehnline Museum of Art.

Postiglione is a founding member of the Chicago Art Critics Association and has taught at several Chicago institutions, including Columbia College Chicago, where he was a member of the art department faculty for over 30 years. He lives and works in Chicago with his wife, artist Kathie Shaw.

Corey Postiglione, 4 units orange, acrylic/canvas, 3 x 3 ft., 1973.

== Work ==
In the early 1970s, Postiglione began creating minimalist drawings and paintings that were "striking for their purity of intent and realization" and "spare simplicity." Influenced by artists such as Frank Stella, Brice Marden, and Robert Mangold, these works explored the nature of paintings as objects, and often coupled severe geometric abstraction with a sensual celebration of gesture and materials. However, Postiglione's sensibility ran counter to the narrative-driven, representational aesthetic of the Chicago Imagists and Hairy Who, which included artists such as Roger Brown and Ed Paschke, and whose work dominated the Chicago art scene from the late 1960s into the 1980s.

For a time, Postiglione—described by critic Alice Thorson as "a prime mover in the geometric abstractionists' battle for recognition" in Chicago—and like-minded artists struggled to find a home beyond a handful of galleries supportive of their work, such as Jan Cicero and Roy Boyd. In response, Postiglione and four other artists—Carol Diehl, Tony Giliberto, Mary Jo Marks, and Frank Pannier—banded together as the self-named "Artists Anonymous" to call attention to the plight of local abstractionists.

=== Semiotic abstraction ===
Although Postiglione has maintained an abstract aesthetic to the present day, by 1978 he had begun to refashion 1960s hard-edged abstraction through a postmodern filter, creating metaphoric work with a visual connection to the life world that dissolved the opposition between abstraction and referentiality. His Scape and Passage works (1979–1986) drew comparisons to the paintings of Robert Moskowitz, reducing Chicago cityscapes and iconic structures like the Sears Tower to archetypal forms and shapes that paid "homage to the city's built environment (Daniel Burnham's grid plan, Frank Lloyd Wright's horizontal planes, Mies van der Rohe's vertical modules) and to the utopic vision its soaring edifices once embodied."

Corey Postiglione, Utopian Dreams VI, acrylic, 20 x 26 inches, 1995.

Explaining his conceptual development, Postiglione wrote, "My works hold to the universality of abstraction. But this is a semiotic abstraction; that is, I use different categories of abstract art to signify a metaphoric content." He transformed the modernist grids of earlier work in the Labyrinth series (1990–1999), which was influenced by postmodern theorists Fredrick Jameson and Jean Baudrillard, and writer Jorge Luis Borges. In it, Postiglione probed personal themes of passage and sociocultural subjects such as decenteredness and progress within the formal motifs of the maze and labyrinth. Writing about works collectively entitled Utopian Dreams, critic Susan Snodgrass said, "the artist begins to question modernism's unwavering belief in modernity's (and art's) promise for social transformation."

In his subsequent Exponential (1998–2009) and Tango (2002–2015) works, Postiglione expanded his vocabulary to include nodules, intertwined ovals and coiled pathways that reference constellations, molecular biology and viruses. These works often "rely on elegant line and subtle coloration as bait to seduce the eye and draw the viewer close" in order to contemplate the entanglement of pandemic, mortality and interconnection in an increasingly globalized world as well as the "movement, precision and seduction" of the dance.

Postiglione has moved beyond canvas and paper in his five Population exhibitions (2004–2016), producing site-specific paintings and interactive and collaborative installations that address demographic growth and the attendant issues of interdependence, scarcity and conflict.

In a 2018 interview, Postiglione described his approach in workmanlike terms: "I enjoy process and material and hands-on work. I have always said in reference to the conceptual aspects of the medium: when you make a painting, you are making at times a thousand critical decisions. It gives me great pleasure to make something and make it with precision and difficulty." Postiglione works out of the Ravenswood, Chicago studio he shares with his wife, Kathie Shaw. He and Shaw were featured in two-person exhibitions at the Koehnline Museum of Art (2018), Ukrainian Institute of Modern Art (2021), Evanston Art Center (2022), and Harper College (2024).

Corey Postiglione, Tango Tres Blancos, acrylic on canvas, 48 x 66 inches, 2013.

== Art criticism ==
Postiglione has worked as an art critic for more than three decades, making contributions to the New Art Examiner, Artforum, Dialogue, and C Magazine. His written work includes features on Daniel Buren, Ed Paschke, Martin Puryear and Alexander Calder, and exhibit reviews of Julia Fish, Michiko Itatani, Susan Michod, Dan Peterman, and Frank Stella, among many. He has also written catalogue essays for numerous artists, including Tim Anderson, Alexandra Domowska, James Juszczyk, Terrence Karpowicz, Arthur Lerner, and John Phillips. In 2022, he contributed the New Art Examiner essay, "A Meditation on Art in the Time of Chaos," about creating art during a global pandemic.

Postiglione has been an active curator of painting, drawing and sculpture exhibitions, in Chicago and nationally. These exhibitions have focused on single artists as well as on themes such as abstraction, the postmodern nude, travel, and postmodern landscape. In 2018, he curated a retrospective at the Ukrainian Institute of Modern Art in Chicago for his former mentor at the University of Illinois in Chicago, abstract artist and educator Martin Hurtig. Postiglione has also appeared publicly in a wide range of art forums, lectures and symposia.

== Teaching ==
During a teaching career of over forty years, Postiglione has served as a mentor to many artists and art professionals. He first taught at the Evanston Art Center in 1971, where "he found himself leading a class of women at a time when the contemporary feminist movement was coming into its own and so were they." Many of these students went on to long art-world careers, including artists Barbara Blades, Carol Diehl, Bonnie Hartenstein, Ellen Kamerling, Elizabeth Langer, Fern Shaffer and Annette Turow, and gallery owner Jan Cicero. The center's 75th-anniversary exhibit, "A Moment in Time: Women Artists and the EAC School, 1971-1978" (2004), commemorated that period by featuring work by the above-mentioned artists and six others that Postiglione taught during that time.

Postiglione taught art at several higher learning institutions in Chicago in the 1970s, including the School of the Art Institute of Chicago, University of Illinois in Chicago and Illinois Institute of Technology. In 1979, he moved to Columbia College Chicago's Department of Art and Design, where he taught art history and criticism, graphic design, painting and studio practice, and create an "Art in Chicago" course. He was tenured in 1996 and retired as professor emeritus in 2014.
