= Artist cooperative =

Association jointly owned and controlled by its members

An artist cooperative (also co-operative or co-op) is an autonomous visual arts organization, enterprise, or association jointly owned and democratically controlled by its members. Artist cooperatives are legal entities organized as non-capital stock corporations, non-profit organizations, or unincorporated associations. Such cooperatives typically provide professional facilities and services for its artist-members, including studios, workshops, equipment, exhibition galleries, and educational resources. By design, all economic and non-economic benefits and liabilities of the cooperative are shared equally among its members. Cooperative members elect their board of directors from within the membership. Artist cooperatives have historically provided shared resources, exhibition opportunities, and professional support to artists outside of traditional gallery or institutional systems. In the 21st century, artist cooperatives are expanding beyond physical spaces and include digital platforms and online marketplaces that are run on cooperative principles.

== History ==
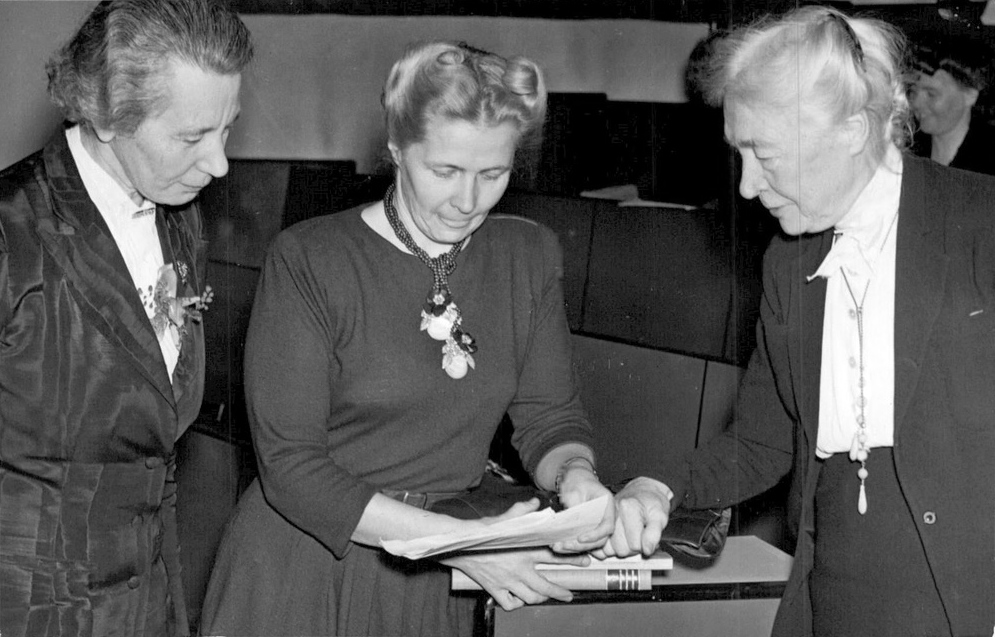

Artist cooperatives have existed since at least the mid-twentieth century. The Arts and Crafts Cooperative, Inc. (ACCI) Gallery was founded in Berkeley, California in 1939 and is one of the oldest artist cooperatives in the United States. Another example of note is Magnum Photos, a photographer-owned cooperative founded in 1947. It was established in order to give photographers more control over the ownership and distribution of their photos.

In the United States in the 1970s, artist cooperatives sought alternatives to traditional art institutions and commercial galleries. Protests were had over the limited representation of women and artists of color in museums and exhibitions. This led to a number of artist-run cooperatives being established to provide exhibition opportunities, professional support, and educational resources. Artemisia Gallery and ARC Gallery were both founded in Chicago in 1973. They operated as cooperative galleries as well as educational organizations that were dedicated to increasing the visibility of women artists, and provided professional development opportunities.

== Structure and purpose ==
Cooperative organization

Artist cooperatives are democratically owned and controlled by their members. Governance of artist cooperatives can include rotating leadership, joint decision-making, and shared responsibility for managing the organization. Members typically elect directors or other leaders from within the cooperative and they share in both the benefits and responsibilities of membership.

Unlike traditional commercial galleries, artist cooperatives are managed by their members collectively. On top of producing artwork, members contribute to administrative, marketing, exhibition, and governance activities needed to maintain the cooperative. Members of the cooperative may also contribute membership dues, volunteer labor, or other resources to support the organization and its operations.

Economic and professional support

Artist cooperatives give artists access to exhibition space, workshops, equipment, educational resources, and professional services that may be difficult to obtain on their own. Artist cooperatives can help emerging artists establish a professional reputation by providing access to markets, customers, and business support. Rural artists also may benefit from cooperative membership by gaining access to broader markets and audiences outside their local communities.

Artist cooperatives often function as an alternative to commercial galleries and traditional art institutions. By collectively managing exhibition spaces and other resources, members can maintain more control over the presentation and promotion of their work while sharing costs and responsibilities with other artists.

Community and education

Many artist cooperatives also provide educational and professional development. Artemisia Gallery, for instance, organized workshops, lectures, and public programs that addressed issues like professional development, economic structures inside the art world, and feminist art education. The cooperative also developed educational resources as well as public programming intended to support artists and to increase visibility for their work.

Artist cooperatives also might provide mentorships, networking opportunities, and collaboration among its members. As well as supporting artists professionally, cooperatives foster communities where artists share knowledge, resources, and experiences while participating in collective decision-making.

== Digital initiatives ==
=== Online artist cooperatives ===
Online artist cooperatives are a form of platform cooperative where artists use digital marketplaces which are owned and governed by their members as opposed to outside investors. The growth of online marketplaces provided opportunities for artists and crafters to sell work directly to consumers. After policy and fee changes at Etsy, some artists sought to create a cooperative online marketplace. After the Etsy artist strike in 2022, several artists and crafters organized an online cooperative marketplace. They received funds from Start.coop during their development.

=== Cooperative alternatives ===
Artisans Cooperative was created for artists and crafters to sell their artwork and crafts online. It is a multi-stakeholder cooperative allowing both sellers and buyers to become members. Three months after opening to the public, Artisans Cooperative reported nearly 300 members and around 150 shops. Stocksy United is another online platform cooperative that was formed by photographers after the sale of iStockphoto to Getty Images. The cooperative allows photographers to collectively set quality standards and participate in the governance of the company.

== See also ==
- ABC Artists' Books Cooperative
- Artist-run initiative
- Artist-run space
- National Cooperative Business Association
