= Arthur Lerner =

American painter

- Born: 1929 (age 96–97); Chicago, Illinois, U.S.
- Education: School of the Art Institute of Chicago (BFA, MFA); University of Chicago (attended); Roosevelt University (attended)
- Style: Representational
- Spouse: Carole Harmel
- Website: Official website

Arthur Lerner (born 1929) is an American artist, known for his atmospheric figurative paintings and drawings, landscapes, and still lifes. He is sometimes described as a realist, but most critics observe that his work is more subjective than descriptive or literal. Associated with Chicago's influential "Monster Roster" artists early in his career, he shared their enthusiasm for expressive figuration, fantasy and mythology, and their existential outlook, but diverged increasingly in his classical formal concerns and more detached temperament. Critics frequently note in Lerner's art a sense of light that evokes Impressionism, delicate color and modelling that "flirts with dematerialization," and the draftsmanship that serves as a foundation for all of his work. The Chicago Tribune's Alan Artner lamented Lerner's comparative lack of recognition in relation to the Chicago Imagists as the fate of "an aesthete in a town dominated by tenpenny fantasts." Lerner's work has been extensively covered in publications, featured in books such as Monster Roster: Existential Art in Postwar Chicago, and acquired by public and private collections, including those of the Smithsonian Institution, Art Institute of Chicago, Smart Museum of Art, and Mary and Leigh Block Museum of Art, among many.

== Life and education ==
Lerner was born and raised in the ethnic neighborhood of Humboldt Park on Chicago's west side. Interested in art as a child, he took classes at the School of the Art Institute of Chicago (SAIC) at age twelve, and won a scholarship there in 1946. He joined a student body composed largely of older G.I. Bill veterans, including Leon Golub, Cosmo Campoli and Seymour Rosofsky. Many of them would be collectively dubbed the "Monster Roster" by critic Franz Schulze in the late 1950s, for their expressionist figurative work, and regarded as forerunners to the more widely known and organized Imagists. Lerner studied under painters Louis Ritman and Boris Anisfeld, earning his BFA (1951) and MFA (1952) at SAIC. During this time, he exhibited in the seminal Momentum Exhibitions of 1948-1950, organized by SAIC and Institute of Design students in protest over their exclusion from the Art Institute's prestigious "Annual Exhibition by Artists of Chicago and Vicinity."

After graduating, Lerner won a foreign travel fellowship (1952) and a Fulbright grant (1957), which took him for a year to Rome and to Florence, respectively. The experience left an enduring mark; his studies of Renaissance and Baroque art, as well as classical literature like Dante, took his developing work in figurative, mythological and mystical directions, while solidifying his classically influenced aesthetics. Travel would exert a strong influence throughout his career, inspiring a decade-plus shift to landscape painting in the late 1970s, and a return to the figure in the mid-1990s.

In 1961, Lerner joined the art faculty at City Colleges of Chicago, where he would teach until retiring in 1996. Over the last five decades, he has been featured in solo exhibitions at the Jan Cicero, Walter Wickiser (New York), LIPA, and Printworks galleries, and shown at institutions including the Art Institute of Chicago, Smart Museum of Art, Hyde Park Art Center, Chicago Ukrainian Institute of Modern Art, and Chicago Cultural Center, which honored him with a solo show in 2000. Lerner continues to work and live, with his wife, artist Carole Harmel, in Chicago.

== Work ==
Lerner's work reflects both a deep connection to art history and a commitment to his own deeply personal path. Fusing his regard for Rembrandt, Renaissance and Baroque masters, Degas, expressionists like Soutine, and modernists like Francis Bacon and Giacometti, he developed an introspective, intuitive style that suggests but eludes labels like Expressionism, Impressionism, Surrealism, Fantasy, Classicism, or Realism. Hallmarks of his style are his atmospheric modelling, restrained palette, and intense, bleaching light, which often creates a diaphanous space in which subjects appear "inexplicably muted as if viewed through a mist or scrim" or seem to hover "somewhere between mirage and dream." Lerner's work can be classified into three main categories: figurative works, still lifes, and landscapes.

Arthur Lerner, Descent, oil on linen, 60" x 62", 2001.

=== Figurative work ===
Lerner has a longstanding affinity for the figure as a universal metaphor capable of expressing the full range of human experience. His early work, influenced by Expressionism, mythology, and the existentialism of Sartre and Camus, consisted of frontal paintings and conté drawings that featured isolated, fantastical creatures (Phoenix, 1955; Harpy, 1957), anguished heads (Screaming Head, 1962), or agonized, cadaver-like figures (the Torn series, 1960-2), often dissolving into painterly color-field backgrounds. In addition to their emotional charge, these works have been noted for their "fascination with surface and the interplay of light and shadow" and compared to the work of Moore, Baskin, and Bacon. Lerner exhibited extensively at the time, locally and abroad, notably in several Art Institute "Chicago and Vicinity" exhibits, shows at the Seattle Art Museum, Brooklyn Museum and Antioch College, and solo exhibitions at the John L. Hunt (1963) and Anna Werbe (Detroit, 1964) galleries, Elmhurst College (1972), and Alverno College (1973).

Over time, Giacometti's influence on Lerner grew and his work became more detached and ethereal, with "substantiality and concreteness displaced by diffusion of light" and color suppressed in favor of tonality and pale hue. The shift, glimpsed in portraits, such as Laura I (1975), continued into the 1990s when Lerner returned to the figure after abandoning it for roughly a decade. Inspired by a visit to The Museum of the Mummies in Guanajuato, Mexico, he began exploring the beauty of decay and the feelings evoked by death through depictions of mummified, skeletal or hanged figures, corpses, and mythological subjects. Reviews commented on the epic tone, muted horror, "delicate animation and expressive grace" of works like Descent (2001) that considered humanity "variously as puppets in the game of life, pure physical matter, or tortured souls." Artist Neil Goodman, who curated an Indiana University show of this work, described the paintings as "both troubling and enticing, yet beautiful in the way that only visual language can embrace a paradox."

Lerner has said about this work, "Mummies and mythical figures in my work are not intended to represent specific political or historical events in any way, but rather to act as symbols or metaphors for the terror, the anguish, the tragic, the comic—even the absurdity and the beauty of life as we experience it." In subsequent years, Lerner exhibited similar work in shows contemplating the effects of war, genocide, and the Holocaust.

Arthur Lerner, Bones, Gourd and Shells, oil on linen, 48" x 60", 1990.

=== Still lifes ===
In the late 1970s, Lerner made a major shift to still lifes and landscapes, prompted by a trip to the French maritime Alps, and later cemented after the purchase of a summer home in coastal Maine. Upon returning to Chicago, he began working on minimalist paintings of paper bags (1978) that, formally, recalled the mountains for him. He then turned to spare groupings of natural materials like rocks, shells, driftwood, leaves, bones and gourds that have been likened to Zen gardens in their "calculated casualness," careful arrangement, and spatial tension. Contrasting them to his other work, Lerner describes the still lifes as "a more direct approach to the pure pleasure of looking at things."

Like the landscapes that would follow, these new paintings were simultaneously more precise and concrete—sometimes suggesting the detachment of Philip Pearlstein—and yet more abstract. Critics attributed this to Lerner's "opalescent light," which gave his shadows palpable form and created the "effect of a hazy, delicately colored, and possibly mystical procession of shapes across the canvas" that suggested landscapes. This artistic fiction transformed what appeared to be simple paintings, such as Bones, Gourds and Shells (1990), into metaphysical works that evoked a mood of mystery and quietude critics likened to the work of Giorgio Morandi.

Arthur Lerner, Canyon Series V, oil on linen, 50" x 72", 1996.

=== Landscapes ===
Concurrent with the still lifes, Lerner began painting Maine coastscapes. Describing the contrast between Maine's "dramatic, almost brooding landscape" and Chicago's urban unruliness as "a kind of epiphany," he said, "I became drawn into the more spiritual, psychological and atmospheric qualities and the sense of oneness that pervades everything in nature."

Critics described these new paintings as "landscapes of wonderment" and "hard-headed poetry"; and compared them to the work of Hopper and Rothko, noting Lerner's use of light as an agent of transformation to harmonize what he sees in nature. In reviews covering four shows at Jan Cicero Gallery (1986-1997), Alan Artner observed that the light alternately gave "shadows the solidity of rock and rock the buoyancy of snow" or bleached out land and seascapes in its intensity, detaching them from their natural contexts. He wrote that paintings like Coastscape Series III (1985-6) revealed keen observation, yet diverged from reality to create a sense of feeling and atmosphere that became almost abstract. In later series, Lerner focused on the brighter reds, yellows and blues of Arizona's red rock country and the subtler palettes of the Grand Canyon, in works like Canyon Series V (1996).

== Teaching ==
Lerner began his teaching career at Ray-Vogue College, a commercial art school in Chicago, in 1955. He worked there until 1957, teaching fine arts, illustration and design. In 1961, he was hired at City Colleges of Chicago, where he would teach basic drawing, figure drawing, and painting until his retirement in 1996. He was named Distinguished Professor, Richard J. Daley College in 1986–7. Lerner modeled his approach on that of his own SAIC figure drawing teacher, Robert Lifvendahl, taking a highly structured approach to teaching foundational technique and methods to a broad spectrum of students that included college teens, blue-collar workers, and retirees. Lerner also taught at Ox-Bow School of Art, School of the Art Institute of Chicago in 1961.

== Collections and recognition ==
Lerner's art is represented in numerous public and private collections, including those of the: Smithsonian Institution, Art Institute of Chicago, Smart Museum of Art, Mary and Leigh Block Museum of Art, Farhat Cultural Center (Beirut, Lebanon), Ukrainian Institute of Modern Art, U.S. State Department Cultural Division, Harry S. Truman College, United Airlines, Continental Bank of Illinois (now Bank of America), Northern Trust Bank of Illinois, Kemper Insurance Companies, Jenner and Block, Inc., Hahn, Holland and Grossman, Joseph Shapiro, and David and Sarajean Ruttenberg, among many. He has been recognized with National Endowment for the Arts awards (1981, 1982), a Fulbright Grant (1957-8), and a James Nelson Raymond Foreign Travel Fellowship (1952–3).
