= Phyllis Bramson =

American artist

- Born: 1941 (age 84–85); Madison, Wisconsin, U.S.
- Education: University of Illinois, Urbana-Champaign (BFA); University of Wisconsin, Madison (MFA); School of the Art Institute of Chicago (MFA)
- Style: Figurative, postmodern
- Website: Phyllis Bramson

Phyllis Bramson (born 1941) is an American artist, based in Chicago and known for "richly ornamental, excessive and decadent" paintings described as walking a tightrope between "edginess and eroticism." She combines eclectic influences, such as kitsch culture, Rococo art and Orientalism, in juxtapositions of fantastical figures, decorative patterns and objects, and pastoral landscapes that affirm the pleasures and follies of romantic desire, imagination and looking. Bramson shares tendencies with the Chicago Imagists and broader Chicago tradition of surreal representation in her use of expressionist figuration, vernacular culture, bright color, and sexual imagery. Curator Lynne Warren wrote of her 30-year retrospective at the Chicago Cultural Center, "Bramson passionately paints from her center, so uniquely shaped in her formative years […] her lovely colors, fluttery, vignette compositions, and flowery and cartoony imagery create works that are really like no one else's. Writer Miranda McClintic said that Bramson's works "incorporate the passionate complexity of eastern mythology, the sexual innuendos of soap operas and sometimes the happy endings of cartoons."

Bramson's work has been exhibited in exhibitions and surveys at the Museum of Contemporary Art, Chicago (MCA), the Art Institute of Chicago, the Smithsonian Institution, and Corcoran Gallery of Art. In more than forty one-person exhibitions, she has shown at the New Museum, Fort Wayne Museum of Art, Boulder Art Museum, University of West Virginia Museum, and numerous galleries. She has been widely reviewed and recognized with John S. Guggenheim and Rockefeller foundation grants and the Anonymous Was A Woman Award, among others. She was one of the founding members of the early women's art collaborative Artemisia Gallery and a long-time professor at the School of Art and Design at the University of Illinois at Chicago, until retiring in 2007.

Phyllis Bramson, The Good Keeper of All Living Things, mixed media on canvas, 60" × 70", 2016.

== Life and career ==
Bramson was born in Madison, Wisconsin in 1941 to parents who ran an auto parts wholesale business. She earned a BFA in Drawing and Painting from the University of Illinois at Urbana-Champaign (1962) and an MA in painting at the University of Wisconsin (1964), where she created paintings influenced by the Bay Area Figurative Movement. After getting married, she and her husband settled in Glenview, Illinois in 1966; Bramson found work as a window designer, creating the highly visible, theatrical displays downtown at Marshall Field's, then Chicago's most prominent department store. In the late 1960s, she taught at the Chicago Academy of Art and Columbia College and enrolled at the School of the Art Institute of Chicago, where she earned an MFA in 1973. After graduating, she helped co-found Artemisia Gallery with artists including Margaret Wharton, Mary Stoppert, Joy Poe, Barbara Grad, Phyllis McDonald, and Vera Klement.

In the mid-1980s, Bramson gained recognition for her paintings through solo exhibitions at the New Museum and Monique Knowlton Gallery in New York City, the Marianne Deson and Dart galleries (Chicago), Gallerie Farideh Cadot (Paris), and a mid-career survey at Chicago's Renaissance Society (1986). She also appeared in major group shows at the MCA, Art Institute of Chicago, Madison Art Center, and Hyde Park Art Center. In 1985, Bramson joined the art faculty at the University of Illinois in Chicago, teaching until 2007, when she retired as professor emerita. Throughout that time, she exhibited regularly at Phyllis Kind, Carl Hammer, Printworks and Zolla/Lieberman in Chicago, and Littlejohn Contemporary and Claire Oliver in New York, among others. Since 2007, she has advised MFA students at the School of the Art Institute and continues to work in Chicago.

== Art work ==
Bramson has worked in painting, drawing, collage and assemblage. Her approach, influences and themes, however, have remained relatively consistent. She works intuitively, without plans or sketches, an organic process she describes as "wayward" and "free fall." "My studio is a place for bricolage. It's roiling with stuff in bins, on shelves, on the floor. The putting together of this stuff is basically is a mystery to me," she has said. Her work can be divided into three main bodies: sculptural and mixed media work (1970s); mixed-media paintings and bas reliefs (1980– ); and three-dimensional works (2006– ).

=== Influences ===
Bramson assimilates eccentric, diverse social and visual influences. She acknowledges the pull of 1950s conventions of duty, sacrifice and propriety, describing herself as a kind of tourist or voyeur "teetering" between the worlds of her free-spirited, "anything goes" studio life and straight, married suburban life. Those dichotomies inform the paradoxes noted in her work: sweetness and salaciousness, modesty and exhibitionism, kitsch and art, East and West, disappointment and hope, longing and pleasure. Aesthetically, she draws from richly visual, wide-ranging sources. Her attraction to pattern, beauty and sensuality was formed by youthful experiences in her home of Chinoiserie (the Western decorative imitation of East Asian artistic traditions), kitsch objects, and 1950s girlie magazines and calendars. Later inspirations range from Rococo art to the outsider paintings of Henry Darger to the historical tradition of Persian miniatures and pleasure gardens.

Bramson relates strongly to what she calls Chicago's "history of independent artmaking." Both she and critics have noted her shared interest in expressive figuration and theatrical spaces with the city's "Monster Roster" artists of the 1950s, such as Robert Barnes, Ellen Lanyon and Irving Petlin (sometimes called "Magic Realists"), Seymour Rosofsky, and June Leaf. Critics also note similarities to the more well-known Chicago Imagists, in her work's immediacy, vernacular references and unnerving poetics, but generally conclude that it differs in its more personal, lyrical, dream-like and inward orientation. Bramson describes herself as bridging the groups: "I have the humor and salaciousness of some of the Imagists, but I want my figure to have a certain reality to it. I don't take too many liberties."

Phyllis Bramson, Shipwrecked, oil on canvas, 72" x 96", 1987.

=== Themes ===
According to the late critic James Yood, "Bramson has pursued what seems an inexhaustible exploration of the inexhaustible wonder of human coupling, its forms, its rituals, its absurdities, its essential and revelatory nature, sometimes its wistfulness and hints of melancholy." While Bramson has remained remarkably consistent in her exploration of romantic love, her work—once described as "a riddle disguised as a love-letter"—leaves plenty of room for interpretation. Writer Joanna Frueh places Bramson in the "romantic Individualist" tradition of intense feeling, love-longing, alienation and morality, and considers artmaking and sex—including "the voluptuousness, risks, temptations and delights attendant on both themes"—as the implicit, twin subjects of her work. Dennis Adrian suggested that painting was a place for Bramson to explore states of feeling, dreams and fantasies that were otherwise risky, impossible, unacceptable or undesirable. Bramson seems to agree: "To me, making art is a difficult, intense activity where I can do a lot of things I wouldn't do out in the world. It's an area where I can function on a dangerous and erotic level. I'm sort of watching myself do it."

Lynne Warren suggests that while her work looks nostalgically to a time in which longing and desire were satisfied in a slow, tension-filled unfolding, it also contains social commentary and political critique "that fully inhabit today's reality." While Bramson has generally been uncomfortable with strict feminist readings of her work, considering them too confining, writers have identified challenges to the power dynamics of relationships and societal structure in her work. Artforum's Colin Westerbeck wrote that Bramson's straddling of her private, domestic life and public, artistic one provided insights into the balancing acts required of women that are reflected in her contorted figures acting out exaggerated roles and accommodations to traditional expectations. Art historian Lisa Wainwright suggests these insights are also embedded in her strategy of collage, which parallels the way women construct their lives out of many masks, roles and identities. In her essay, "Feminine Wiles: Modern Art's Fear of the Female," New Art Examiner editor Kathryn Hixson highlighted Bramson's unapologetic reassertion of the emotional and physical power of the feminine in the face of the fear that the article discusses.

=== Mixed media work (1970s) ===
Bramson has described herself as "an archetypal 1970s art-school graduate," who abandoned painting in the commonly held belief that it was a "dead" medium. She explored ceramic, pastel, objects, fans, beads, sequins, glitter and fabric, fashioning doll-like, sculptural portraits, mixed media drawings, and assemblages that some suggest were influenced by her window display work at Marshall Field's. Joanna Frueh observed that Bramson's use of feminine paraphernalia interwove "passion, conflict, and eroticism," heatedly spinning her own self-emergence as well as the concurrent cultural emergence of women.

Critics see in this early work a steady, if circuitous, search for her style through successive (and ultimately successful) experiments. Dennis Adrian later wrote that while this work never fully resolved the balance between its emblematic, fetishistic quality and three-dimensional "object-ness," it clarified Bramson's artistic persona and afforded her an "impressive freedom" she would use to powerful, unified effect in her mature work.

Phyllis Bramson, Picturing a Model World, mixed media and collage on canvas, 50" x 72", 2003.

=== Paintings and bas reliefs (1980– ) ===
In 1980, Bramson returned to painting, inspired by an influential exhibition of Phillip Guston's figurative work. Critics identify several formal qualities that define Bramson's mature painting. One is her absorption of the painterly lessons of Abstract Expressionism, which dates to her earliest training. She combines those effects with a decorative impulse using lively patterning, which connects and unifies disparate compositional elements, and creates the "rhythmic dynamism," musicality, and frenetic energy in her paintings. Another unifying factor is her notably high-keyed color palette, described variously as: hot, steamy, lush and raucous, brash, and vibrantly acidic. Bramson holds her generally packed, topsy-turvy scenes together with what has been described as an "astute sense of composition." Finally, critics note her Surrealist sense of juxtaposition and spatial ambiguity, including a freewheeling approach to reality where abstract and figurative are often interchangeable, creating a context of danger, disorientation and flux.

Bramson's early paintings often borrowed strategies from Japanese woodcut design, breaking compositions into rectilinear sections or diptychs, but in signature works like The Dance (1985) and Shipwrecked (1987), she began tackling larger-scale, panoramic compositions with deep landscape spaces. Within them, she would orchestrate a growing personal iconography, both familiar and bizarre: performer-exhibitionists, flamboyant costumes and accoutrements, theatrical objects (masks, globes, vases, swords, pillars) and exotic settings. Her dreamlike, emotionally charged vignettes implied archetypal, yet open-ended, relational scenarios, with contorted figures clinging to masts, bending over backwards, or paddling as waves swirled around sinking boats. While some critics wondered if the work contained too much, others praised it for just that quality, seeing in it "the richness and the adventure of living at the peak of desire."

Bramson worked in a more postmodern fashion in the 1990s, employing collage, appropriation, Rococo pictorial strategies and kitsch elements to a greater degree, and adding more social and cultural commentary to her work. She combined her own paintings with found fabric, bric-a-brac, lace, decorative moulding, and cut-up elements such as fruits, flowers and jewels from mass-produced shopping-mall paintings, balancing an enigmatic lexicon of collected and invented signs, stylistic and tonal shifts, and far-flung cultural references in increasingly complex, Bosch-like compositions, such as Picturing a Model World (2003).

Phyllis Bramson, Little Goody Two Shoes, mixed media on canvas, 49" x 64", 1996.

In works like Little Goody Two Shoes (1996), Bramson fractured and exploded the rectangular format with piled up, supplemental framed paintings and objects. Observing the myriad symbols of female sexuality—all out of reach of the male presences—critics suggested these densely-layered works created new types of pictorial space with their own internal logic beyond what seemed apparent. In these new configurations, Bramson re-coded banal or sweet imagery through juxtaposition and association in order to express, variously, female physicality, sensuous pleasure, a reclaiming of kitsch, and a sense of cultural apprehension. Against the notion that these paintings were "too over the top," Kathryn Hixson argued that they "offer sensuous pleasure fraught with heated desire and attest to the power of decoration to mesmerize." Critics contend that Bramson's paintings of the 2000s have become more excessive and peculiar, offering fantastical, gender-bending images and atmosphere that refuse easy interpretation. Art in America's Robert Berlind described them as a combination of "sensual allure and downright goofiness" that "shuttles viewers between pleasure, humor and puzzlement."

Phyllis Bramson, A Glimpse of Paradise, mixed media, sculpture/objects: 20" × 16" × 13", Scroll: 53" × 16", 2015.

=== Three-dimensional works (2006– ) ===
In the 2000s, Bramson increasingly realized the object-based qualities of her earlier bas relief paintings. These more sculptural works incorporate assemblage and arrangements of found objects, with shelves and other elements projected off of walls, as in her "scroll works" first begun in 2006 (e.g., A Glimpse of Paradise, 2015). In the scroll pieces, she combines characteristic romantic imagery and allusions—painted on long, flowing sectioned sheets—with souvenir-like objects that suggest desires and memories assigned to and re-packaged into icons. Together, the visual elements imply the unfolding and revealing of fantasies and histories of the eclectic cast of characters Bramson has borrowed from kitsch and other cultural sources.

== Curating ==
In 2019, Bramson organized the exhibition, "What Came After: Figurative Painting in Chicago 1978-1998" at the Elmhurst Art Museum, which focused on an informal collective of figurative artists alternately called third-generation or Post-Imagists, or the "Chicago School." The show included artists such as Nicholas Africano, Bramson herself, Susanne Doremus, Richard Hull, Michiko Itatani, Paul Lamantia, Jim Lutes, David Sharpe, Hollis Sigler, and Mary Lou Zelazny, among others. The late critic James Yood (in whose memory the exhibition was dedicated) was among those who championed this group, which both built on, and sought to break free from, the Imagist legacy through more emotionally immediate and introspective explorations of the human condition that in formal terms were more painterly, compositionally open, and spatially expansive. Curator Lynne Warren describes them as "a rich tradition of image-making" somewhat obscured by the Imagist label, while writer Deven Golden connects them to earlier post-World War II Chicago traditions through a shared emphasis on accessibility, psychology, individuality and intimacy. Bramson has also curated shows at the University of Illinois and the Rockford Art Museum, among others.

== Awards and collections ==
Bramson has been awarded fellowships and grants from the John S. Guggenheim (1993), Louis Comfort Tiffany (1980) and Rockefeller (1997) foundations, National Endowment for the Arts (1976, 1983, 1993), Fulbright Program (1988), Illinois Arts Council (1981, 1988), and Vermont Studio Center (1996), among many. She has been recognized with the Anonymous Was A Woman Award (2009), the School of Art + Design at University of Illinois at Urbana's Distinguished Alumni Award (2010), and the Distinguished Artist Award from the Union League Club of Chicago (2012). In 2014, she received the Women's Caucus for Art Lifetime Achievement Award for her "commitment to the erotic, affirmative representation of female agency and sexuality" in her art.

Bramson's art is represented in numerous private collections, including those of the Art Institute of Chicago, Corcoran Museum of Art, Library of Congress, New Museum, Brooklyn Museum, Museum of Contemporary Art Chicago, Hirshhorn Museum and Sculpture Garden, National Museum of American Art, Smart Museum of Art, Milwaukee Art Museum, Raclin Murphy Museum of Art, Pennsylvania Academy of the Fine Arts, Illinois State Museum, Mary and Leigh Block Museum of Art, and Madison Museum of Contemporary Art, as well as those of more than thirty universities and colleges, and many private organizations, including the JP Morgan Chase Collection.
