= Jane Wenger =

American artist (born 1944)

- Born: 1944 (age 81–82); New York City, New York, United States
- Education: University of Illinois, IIT Institute of Design, Alfred University
- Known for: Photography
- Awards: Illinois Arts Council
- Website: Jane Wenger Photography

Jane Wenger, 09-10-1976.3-3, from the "Self-Portrait" series, Gelatin silver print, 3" x 3.625", 1976.

Jane Wenger (born 1944) is an American artist known for black-and-white photography of abstracted human forms. Her work has been described as intense, visceral and enigmatic. It captures the body in intimate close-up, often during moments of extreme physical tension, in compressed compositions with minimal context. Wenger has exhibited at MoMA PS1, Museum of Contemporary Art, Chicago (MCA), Museum of Fine Arts, Houston, and the Milwaukee Art Museum. Her photographs belong to the collections of the Museum of Modern Art, MCA Chicago, Museum of Contemporary Photography and Indianapolis Museum of Art, among others.

== Life and career ==
Wenger was born in New York City in 1944. She attended Alfred University (SUNY), earning a BFA in ceramics (1966). There, she studied with John Wood and experimented with photography. In 1967, she relocated to Chicago, where she completed the course work for an MS in Photography at the Illinois Institute of Technology's Institute of Design (1969) developed by Harry Callahan, Aaron Siskind and others. She received an MFA in photography from the School of Art and Design, University of Illinois at Chicago (1980). Her early figurative work was influenced by modernists and surrealists such as Bill Brandt and Magritte, as well as by fashion photographers such as Hiro, Guy Bourdin and Chris von Wangenheim. From 1975 to 1986, Wenger taught photography at the University of Illinois at Chicago.

In 1976, Wenger became a member of and exhibited at the Photography Gallery within Artemisia, an early women's art cooperative. Between 1977 and 1983, Wenger had solo exhibitions at MCA Chicago, MoMA PS1, the Milwaukee Art Museum (a fifteen-year survey) and other venues, and was included in several group shows. She received four Illinois Arts Council grants during this period.

Wenger has described her working process as involving intense, concentrated activity during which she forms and articulates her ideas. In 1985, in a conceptual farewell to photography, she bronzed her camera and called it “The Decisive Moment” (a reference to Henri Cartier-Bresson).

== Work and reception ==
Wenger's black-and-white photographs depict the body in intimate, surreal, visceral detail. Working in series rather than individual photographs, each image contributes to a heightened sense of tension within a series. She uses a wide-angle lenses and unconventional lighting to create an unusual perspective and disorienting effects. The resulting images distill the body into abstract, iconic forms that suggest landscape, terrain, architecture and mythic themes. Wenger's denial of context extends to words—she has stated a preference that her work be viewed without explanatory information; her images are untitled, numbered and dated.

Darkroom processes (cropping, printing), editing and exhibition arrangement are prominent in Wenger's working method. Her series are highly intentional, sequential wholes, designed produce emotional discomfort. While her work is noted for its impact and sense of monumentality, many of her prints are small, often two or three inches by four inches.

=== Early nudes and self-portraits ===
Wenger's mid-1970s work focused on the male nude, often shot from behind, and at low angles with heads cropped out, against dark grounds and skies. The images emphasize the interplay of body and muscles, hands and arms pulling, wrestling and straining against one another. Reviews highlight the series' mythic and sculptural qualities, exploration of the male body's sensuality and strength, and play of forms across the individual images. An exhibition of this work at The Juniper Tree (Spokane, Washington, 1974) led to an early brush with censorship, an issue repeated with her next series.

Jane Wenger, 05-18-1977.5-1 from the "Bald Heads" series, Gelatin silver print, 17" x 14", 1977.

In her "Self-Portraits" (1976), Wenger took a reductive approach to the female nude. Small in measure, the dramatically foreshortened and cropped images transform the female body into abstract suggestions of landscape or monumental totem-like forms. In a 1979 Afterimage review, Carole Harmel contrasted Wenger's tension-filled, sexually ambiguous female forms with Romantic traditions of the nude in repose or harmony with nature.

In 1977, officials of the John Hancock Center—the site of an Artemisia show—censored five of Wenger's self-portraits over concerns about nudity, despite their previous exhibition without controversy at a suburban high school and several colleges. The incident was widely covered in Chicago newspapers, as well as nationally, as the gallery withdrew the entire show. Wenger contended that her work's abstraction transcended concerns about nudity and was less erotic or pornographic than publicly displayed magazines at the building's nearby newsstand.

Wenger in front of Jane Wenger Environmental Installation, PS1, New York, 1982.

=== "Bald Heads" and "Faces" series ===
"Bald Heads" (1977) feature an isolated head, its face generally concealed, in tight close-up against open panoramas and minimal interiors. Wenger shot the images using both strobe and natural light to create unnatural tonal and shadowing effects. The series emphasizes the sensuality of surfaces, with excruciatingly detailed depictions of pores, veins, beads of water and expanses of skin that read as abstract forms, textures and land masses. In a Village Voice review of Wenger's first solo show in New York (Foto, 1978), critic Fred McDarrah described them as surreal pictures with "a strange magnetism" that was "repulsive yet compelling."

For the "Faces" series (1978–9), Wenger shot bodybuilders lifting weights in extreme close-up, leaving only grimacing mouths, clenched teeth and straining mask-like features in flattened space. Critics identified it as her most forceful and shocking work yet, suggesting themes of pain, brutality, strain and age; the Chicago Sun-Times called the often grotesque images work of "extreme candor" and "disturbing impact."

Wenger used the "Faces" images in two installations—a form then rarely adopted by photographers—at MCA Chicago (1981) and PS1 (1982). They consisted of mural-sized prints, hung in a black, narrow, low-ceilinged room with lights pinpointing only the images, forcing viewers into tense, close proximity to the faces. Wenger furthered the sense of disorientation with an enigmatic soundtrack of the groaning, grunting body builders. Reaction to the MCA installation was divided between critics who felt the sound and environment distracted from the images' portrayal of human struggle and those who believed its mix of classically crafted images and unsettling environment broke new ground for photography.

== Later recognition ==
Wenger's photographs have been exhibited in surveys at the Yale University Art Gallery (2008), MCA Chicago ("Art in Chicago: 1945–1995"), Museum of Fine Arts, Houston (1994), and Kelmscott Gallery (Chicago, 1992).
