= Alternative exhibition space =

Art exhibition space

An alternative exhibition space is a space other than a traditional commercial venue used for the public exhibition of artwork. Often comprising a place converted from another use, such as a store front, warehouse, or factory loft, it is then made into a display or performance space for use by an individual or group of artists. According to art advisor Allan Schwartzman "alternative spaces were the center of American artistic life in the '70s."

== United States ==
=== 1970s ===
A prominent wave of alternative spaces in the United States occurred in the 1970s, with the first spaces established in 1969, including the Taller Boricua, founded by Puerto Rican artists in New York, Billy Apple's APPLE, and Robert Newman's Gain Ground, where Vito Acconci produced many important early works. Philadelphia's Painted Bride Art Center also opened in 1969. Some date the start of the tendency from 1970, when 112 Greene Street was founded in New York and with the early curatorial work of Alanna Heiss. The Basement Workshop, an Asian American alternative space for arts and community activism, opened in Chinatown, NYC, in 1970, and the alternative space A.I.R. Gallery opened in Soho in September 1972 as a women's co-op gallery. The Kitchen, an avant-garde performance space, was established in New York in 1971. Around the same time, And/Or Gallery opened in Seattle, Washington, the first alternative space of its kind in the Pacific Northwest. It was founded by Anne Focke. Bonnie Sherk's Crossroads Community (The Farm), another early alternative space, was established in San Francisco in 1974. Real Art Ways, in Hartford, Connecticut, was founded in 1975.

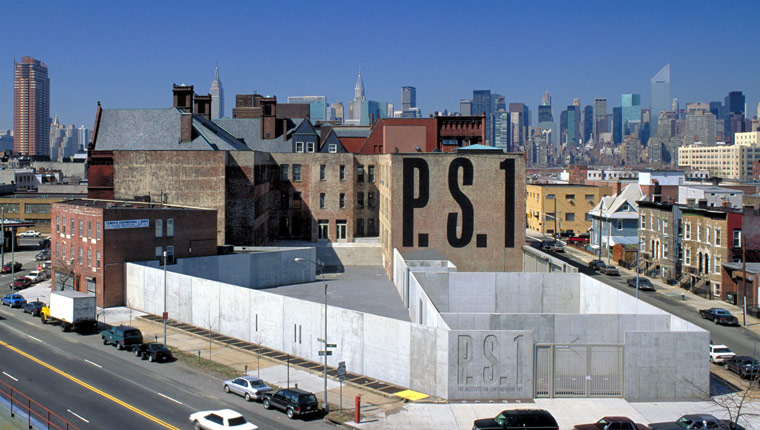
P.S.1 Contemporary Art Center in New York City

The wave of alternative spaces that emerged in the US through the mid-1970s were typically organized by collectives of artists whose interests were focused on conceptual art, mixed media, electronic media, diversity and performance art. For instance, Franklin Furnace Archive in New York was established in 1976 by Martha Wilson to exhibit performance work. LACE in Los Angeles and Washington Project for the Arts showed performance and video work. One of the most enduring alternative spaces in New York, P.S 1, was founded in 1976. Exit Art in Manhattan opened in 1982. In 1981 the New Museum staged the exhibition "Alternatives in Retrospect: An Historical Overview 1969–1975", guest curated by Jacki Apple. This exhibition looked at early New York alternative galleries, Gain Ground, Apple, 98 Greene Street, 112 Greene Street Workshop, 10 Blecker Street, Idea Warehouse and 3 Mercer. The exhibition was documented with a publication and video. Macdonald argues that such spaces emerged in the wake of art practices in the 1960s and 1970s that reacted against the presumed neutrality of the "white cube" gallery space.

=== Alternative Spaces exhibition ===
In Chicago, the exhibition Alternative Spaces curated by Lynne Warren at the Museum of Contemporary Art catalogued the scores of artists and artists' spaces to emerge during that period, including Artemisia Gallery (1973–2003), ARC Gallery (1973–), Gallery Bugs Bunny (1968–1972), N.A.M.E. Gallery (1973–1997), NAB Gallery (1974–1984), and Randolph Street Gallery (1979–1998). Earlier waves in Chicago produced the Hyde Park Art Center (1939–) and Contemporary Art Workshop (1950–2009), while later spaces included 1019 W. Lake St./Noise Factory (1981–1985), W.P.A. Gallery (1981-?) and Axe Street Arena (1985–1989). Hundreds of artists enacted those spaces, including Jim Nutt, H.C. Westermann, Ed Paschke (HPAC), Leon Golub, Nancy Spero (CAC), Hollis Sigler, Vera Klement (Artemisia), Phil Berkman and Gary Justis (N.A.M.E.).

=== Demise in the U.S. ===
Among the factors contributing to the demise of alternative spaces in the late 1980s in the USA was the reduction of public funding for artists and for the arts. With the election of Ronald Reagan as President came a restructuring of federal supports, such as an end to the Comprehensive Employment and Training Act (CETA) program, through which some artists found employment, and restrictions placed upon the National Endowment for the Arts. The net result of the rightward ideological movement in government – with its open hostility to non-traditional art – was that 'alternative artists' were not only de-funded, they and the galleries that featured them were prominently criminalized. By the 1990s, NEA funding was significantly reduced, and so was the number of non-profit galleries.

== Europe ==
In Europe the culture of alternative exhibition spaces differs somewhat from the situation in the United States and has a strong root in the squatting counterculture, which is not illegal in every European country. Also many countries have governmental art funding structures that support many off spaces. In the Netherlands there is OT301, W139 and ADM (evicted) (all in Amsterdam), Roodkapje (Rotterdam), Nest (The Hague), Sign (Groningen). In the UK there is the MK Gallery in Milton Keynes and formerly projects such as 491 Gallery and 121 Centre. Belgium has Het Bos in Antwerp. Liebig 12 is an alternative exhibition space in Berlin. In Vienna there is Moë. Ljubljana has Metelkova with many alternative art spaces, and Copenhagen has alternative spaces in Freetown Christiania. Grand Palais, Lokal-int or Kaskadenkondensator_Basel are an alternative art spaces in Switzerland. The website OFFOFF offers an overview of the swiss scene. Hirvitalo is in Tampere, Finland. In Moldova, coalition of independent cultural sector developed Casa Zemstvei as an alternative exhibition space in 2012.
