= Seymour Rosofsky =

American painter

- Born: 1924; Chicago, Illinois, U.S.
- Died: 1981 (aged 56–57); Chicago, Illinois, U.S.
- Education: School of the Art Institute of Chicago (BFA, MFA)
- Style: Expressionist, surrealist

Seymour Rosofsky (1924–1981) was an American artist, who has been described as one of the key figures in twentieth-century Chicago art. He emerged in the late 1940s at the School of the Art Institute of Chicago (BFA, 1949; MFA, 1951), one of several G.I. Bill veterans, including Leon Golub, Cosmo Campoli and H. C. Westermann, who would join Don Baum, Dominick Di Meo, June Leaf, and Nancy Spero to form the influential movement later dubbed the "Monster Roster" by critic Franz Schulze, which was a precursor to the more well-known Chicago Imagists. Like others in the group, Rosofsky was drawn to the unsettling, macabre side of Surrealism, initially creating gestural, expressionist renderings of grotesque, existentially angst-ridden figures in isolated or uncomfortable situations, that gave way in the 1960s to more fantastical, observational paintings that examined power, politics and domestic relationships in an unflinching way.

Seymour Rosofsky, Unemployment Agency, Oil on canvas, 51" x 72", 1957, Collection of the Art Institute of Chicago.

Rosofsky was recognized for his deftness as a painter, his interest in drawing as a process and medium, and as a caricaturist. His work was exhibited in numerous Art Institute of Chicago "Chicago and Vicinity" shows, the Museum of Contemporary Art Chicago survey "Art in Chicago: 1945–1995," the Whitney Museum of American Art, and a retrospective at the Krannert Art Museum (1984). He was also featured in the Franz Schulze's book Fantastic Images (1972) and Monster Roster: Existential Art in Postwar Chicago (2016). His work can be found in the public collections of the Museum of Modern Art, Smithsonian American Art Museum, Art Institute of Chicago, Los Angeles County Museum of Art, and Museum of Contemporary Art Chicago, among others.

== Life and career ==
Rosofsky was born to Russian and Polish Jewish immigrants on the West Side of Chicago in 1924. He painted from an young age and took weekend classes at the School of the Art Institute of Chicago (SAIC) as a young teen. After he enrolled there, his studies were interrupted by military service in the Army during World War II from 1943–6; he completed his BFA in 1949 and an MFA in 1951, while also taking humanities courses at the University of Chicago and Northwestern University. At SAIC, Rosofsky studied oil painting with the Russian–born artist Boris Anisfeld, a former student of Marc Chagall, whose disciplined, academic teaching instilled in him an appreciation for art history and classical painting skills. He exhibited in the seminal, student-driven Momentum Exhibitions of 1948-1950, organized in protest over the exclusion of students from the Art Institute's prestigious "Chicago and Vicinity" shows. He was also featured, along with Campoli, Golub, and Theodore Halkin in the Art Institute's "Veteran's Exhibition" of 1948. In 1958, he received a Fulbright Fellowship to go to Rome; in 1962, a Guggenheim Foundation grant took him and his family to Paris.

Rosofsky was part of the loose group of artists dubbed the "Monster Roster," which attracted a degree of international attention in the 1950s as a "Chicago School" He was part of a 1956 show at Beloit College curated by Allan Frumkin that brought the group into focus, and the later shows, "The New Chicago Decade: 1950–1960" (Lake Forest College, 1959) and "Haut artistes de Chicago" (Paris, 1962). Throughout his career, Rosofsky was associated with Chicago's more international galleries, such as Richard Feigen, Richard Gray, and B. C. Holland. Rosofsky's work has continued to be shown since his death in museums, galleries and public spaces. In 2011, Chicago Mayor Rahm Emanuel chose Rosofsky's striking but grim Unemployment Agency (1957–8) from the Art Institute's collection to hang on the wall behind his desk at City Hall.

Seymour Rosofsky, Homage to Spain, Thalidomide Children and Others, Oil on canvas, 63" x 49", 1965, Collection of the Art Institute of Chicago.

Rosofsky taught at Chicago Loop College (later Harold Washington College) from 1964 until his death from a heart attack in 1981. He has been cited by many artists, including Phyllis Bramson and William Conger, as an influence.

== Style and themes ==
Rosofsky wrestled with his experiences through intensely personal, penetrating, often brutal, imagery created in a staunchly figurative, gestural style that critics likened to June Leaf's, and described as a mix of expressionism and "surrealist hysteria." Unlike most of the Monster Roster artists, however, his work was more grounded in realism, due to his studies with Boris Anisfeld. Critic Franz Schulze applauded his "rich color, carefully interwoven tonalities and assured drawing." The Chicago Tribune's Alan Artner called his sense of composition masterly, his palette subtle, and his way with the figure strong, but noted a tendency to overload his works that sometimes made them difficult to understand.

Rosofsky was drawn to doleful and withering themes, such as the individual's loss of power in modern life, fraught male-female relationships, the abuse of power and the absurdity of war, often borne out in battered, distorted, sometimes grotesquely comic figures in haunting, fantastical interiors and cityscapes. A lifelong Chicagoan, Rosofsky is considered the post-war artist for whom Chicago—the lake, people, buildings, and abrasive character—was most integral, his bizarre figures and settings often bearing a specificity to the city's locales and conditions. Critic Alan Artner described him as a "poet of exhaustion" depicting an urban carnival of malaise, "disappointment and dejection, of things passing away without proper eulogy, of winter and fading light."

Seymour Rosofsky, The Couple, Color lithograph on white wove paper, 27.75" x 19.75", 1973. Collection of the Art Institute of Chicago.

== Works ==
In the 1950s and early 1960s, Rosofsky often focused on nightmarish modern narratives that featured faceless men, often in hospitals, wheelchairs, and other uncomfortable, vulnerable situations or empty spaces, which he depicted in agitated lines that some critics liken to Alberto Giacometti's graphic work and Francis Bacon's tortured interiors (e.g., Patient in a Dentist Chair, 1961). Unemployment Agency (1957) features several rows of identical men in hats, sitting in severe, tall-backed chairs, facing rows of boxes that recede into a foreboding, bureaucratic infinity. he depicts a funhouse mirror-laden carnival scene in similar fashion in Tilt-a-Whirl (1957).

Time spent in Paris on a fellowship led to a greater surrealist turn in Rosofsky's work, realized in a fantastical, frightening vocabulary of clowns, menacing faces, and bizarre scenarios urgency and a more intense color palette. He often employed these figures in works examining power (e.g., his sardonic depiction of Chicago politics, Daley Machine, 1968) and social issues (Homage to Spain, Thalidomide Children and Others, 1965) that in their focus on generalized dehumanization shared more with New York artist George Tooker, than with Rosofsky's former classmate, Leon Golub's more political work. By the 1970s, Rosofsky turned to caustic depictions of fraught male-female relationships and roles that portrayed cardboard cutouts or stage puppet-like men and women, enacting disturbing scenes in theatrical domestic scenes, such as The Couple (1973) or The Love Fountain (1967). Rosofsky's last works were lighter and more detached, and included "commedia dell'arte" drawings commissioned for the 1982 Venice Biennale's Carnevale del Teatro.

In 2024, his work The Inspector was featured as the cover art for Blake Butler's novel Void Corporation.

== Collections ==
Rosofsky's work is held in the following permanent collections:

- Museum of Modern Art
- Smithsonian American Art Museum
- Art Institute of Chicago
- Los Angeles County Museum of Art
- Museum of Contemporary Art, Chicago
- National Gallery of Art
- Fine Arts Museums of San Francisco
- Hirshhorn Museum and Sculpture Garden
- Pennsylvania Academy of Fine Arts
- Smart Museum of Art
- Block Museum of Art

== Awards ==
- Fulbright fellowship (1958)
- Guggenheim Foundation fellowship (1962)
