= Alice Shaddle =

American sculptor and art teacher (1928–2017)

Alice Shaddle Baum
- Born: Alice Shaddle; December 21, 1928; Hinsdale, Illinois, US
- Died: November 27, 2017 (aged 88)
- Known for: papier-mâché and collage

Alice Shaddle Baum (1928 – 2017) was an American sculptor, collage artist, and founding member of the Artemisia Gallery in Chicago.

== Biography ==
Shaddle was born on December 21, 1928, in Hinsdale, Illinois. She attended Oberlin College for a short while before transferring to the School of the Art Institute of Chicago where she received her BFA in 1954 and her MFA in 1972.

In 1954, Shaddle married artist and curator Don Baum, with whom she had two children. The couple lived in the Hyde Park neighborhood of Chicago, where they purchased the George Blossom House, designed by Frank Lloyd Wright, in 1956. Shaddle and Baum separated in 1970.

Shaddle taught at Hyde Park Art Center for over 50 years (1956–2007) and was an instructor in printmaking and drawing at Roosevelt University, Chicago (1964–1967). She also taught at Old Town Art Center (1978–1985) and the Triangle Art Center (1978–1979).

Shaddle died on November 27, 2017.

== Art ==
Shaddle worked in many media, creating sculpture, floor installations, paintings, prints, drawings, reliefs and cut paper mosaics, boxed objects, magazines, and collages. Her work was exhibited was exhibited widely in Chicago and the vicinity, including at Hyde Park Art Center, Artemisia Gallery, the Art Institute of Chicago, Elmhurst University, the Museum of Contemporary Art, Chicago, and Dell Gallery. Shaddle was a founding member of the Artemisia Gallery in 1973. Her image is included in the iconic 1972 poster Some Living American Women Artists by Mary Beth Edelson.

Her work is in the Smithsonian American Art Museum, the Museum of Contemporary Art, Chicago, and the Illinois State Museum.
