= Susan Michod =

American feminist painter (born 1945)

Susan Michod (January 3, 1945 - August 8, 2026) is an American feminist painter who has been at the forefront of the Pattern and Decoration movement since 1969. Her work "consists of monumental paintings [which are] thickly painted, torn, collaged, spattered, sponged, sprinkled with glitter and infused with a spirit of love of nature and art," the art critic Sue Taylor has written.

After graduating with a Master of Fine Arts degree from Pratt Institute in Brooklyn, Michod moved to Chicago in 1969 and joined a tight-knit community of artists which included Judy Chicago, Vera Klement, Phyllis Bramson, Margaret Wharton, Richard Loving, Robert Kushner and Nancy Spero. She taught art at the Chicago Academy of Fine Arts.

In 1973, Michod co-founded the non-profit women artists' collaborative Artemisia Gallery. Like the groundbreaking A.I.R. Gallery in New York which opened just a year earlier, Artemisia was a forum for women to exhibit their art away from the male-dominated gallery scene. Judy Chicago, Miriam Schapiro, Joyce Kozloff and Nancy Spero were among the artists who exhibited their early work at Artemisia.

Michod's work has been exhibited at institutions including the Art Institute of Chicago, the Renaissance Society at the University of Chicago, the Queens Museum, the Bronx Museum of the Arts and the National Academy in New York City, and it is in the collection of Museum of Contemporary Art, Chicago, and the Illinois State Museum. In addition to Artemisia, her work was also exhibited by the Jan Cicero and Jean Albano galleries in Chicago and the Andre Zarre Gallery in New York.

== Work ==
During the 1970s, Michod began to travel extensively to Yucatán Peninsula, Mexico City and Tucson, Arizona, studying indigenous art and pottery. Her paintings incorporated the designs found in Navajo weaving and Mayan ceramics, but her work was also influenced by the bright colors and bold visual movement of work produced by Henri Matisse and Josef Albers, among others.

In 1977, John Perreault championed Michod's work when he selected it for inclusion in a groundbreaking "Pattern and Decoration" show which he curated at PS1 (now MoMAPS1) in Long Island City.

In the 1980s, Michod branched away from pattern painting toward a more surrealistic style of painting incorporating found objects like toy Tonka tractors, farming equipment (plows, etc.), hair dryers, squeegees and paneled household doors. Writing in the March 1983 issue of Artforum, the critic Judith Russi Kirshner wrote that Michod's "orchestration of two and three-dimensional fauna objects that extend the painted characters into our space recalls the mood of Walt Disney’s Fantasia"; "fueled by [...] the accoutrements of domesticity and motherhood", the paintings are "populated by children's playthings and animated by a child's spirit of fantasy."

In 1997, Michod exhibited a series of paintings at the Chicago Cultural Center called "Fragile Landscapes". The paintings were based on the artist's experience living through a rare brain tumor called an oligodendroglioma that she suffered in 1992. The paintings, landscapes "dominated by a forest motif in neo-expressionist style", were hailed by the Chicago Tribune as being "repositories of feelings" in which "each of the forest pictures has a spectator who reacts in various ways to Michod's maelstrom of strokes and blaze of light. The figure is a stand-in for actual viewers, that is, a member of the audience; but it is also the artist herself serving us as Virgil did Dante in the forest of the Inferno, as a guide."
