= ARC Gallery =

Artists' cooperative in Chicago, IL, US

Coordinates: 41.89599°N 87.66487°W

ARC Gallery is an alternative exhibition space in Chicago, Illinois. Opening in 1973, it was one of the first women artists’ cooperatives in the Midwest along with Artemisia Gallery (another venerable Chicago women’s cooperative that opened on the same block that month). ARC stands for Artists, Residents, Chicago and is one of the longest running women’s cooperative galleries in the country. The original members, recent art school graduates, banded together because they found few female mentors and exhibition opportunities. Through ARC, the members were able to promote their own artwork, feature solo and group exhibitions by many artists from across the county, and create discourse around feminism, art, theory, and practice. In 1979, ARC founded RAWspace, a raw part of the gallery dedicated to exhibiting installation work by visiting artists, selected by ARC members. RAWspace was one of the pioneering spaces in Chicago for the exhibition of installation work.

The founding members of the ARC Gallery were Dalia Alekna, Jan Arnow, Gerda Meyer Bernstein, Judy Lerner Brice, Ellen Ferar, Imfriede Hogan Lagerkvist, Maxine Lowe, Mary Min, Kay Rosen, Civia Rosenberg, Gina Rosenblum, Sara Skolnik Rosenbluth, Laurel Ross, Myra Toth, and Monika Wulfers.
