= Margaret Wharton =

Margaret Wharton (1943-2014) was an American artist, known for her sculptures of deconstructed chairs. She deconstructed, reconstructed and reimagined everyday objects to make works of art that could be whimsical, witty or simply thought-provoking in reflecting her vision of the world.

A longtime Chicago-based artist, Wharton had a prolific and celebrated career. Her work is included in a number of national museums and collections, and she has had lasting impact on multiple generations of artists. She died in her house at the age of 70 on January 20, 2014, in Riverside because of 'complications related to chronic obstructive pulmonary disease'.

== Biography ==
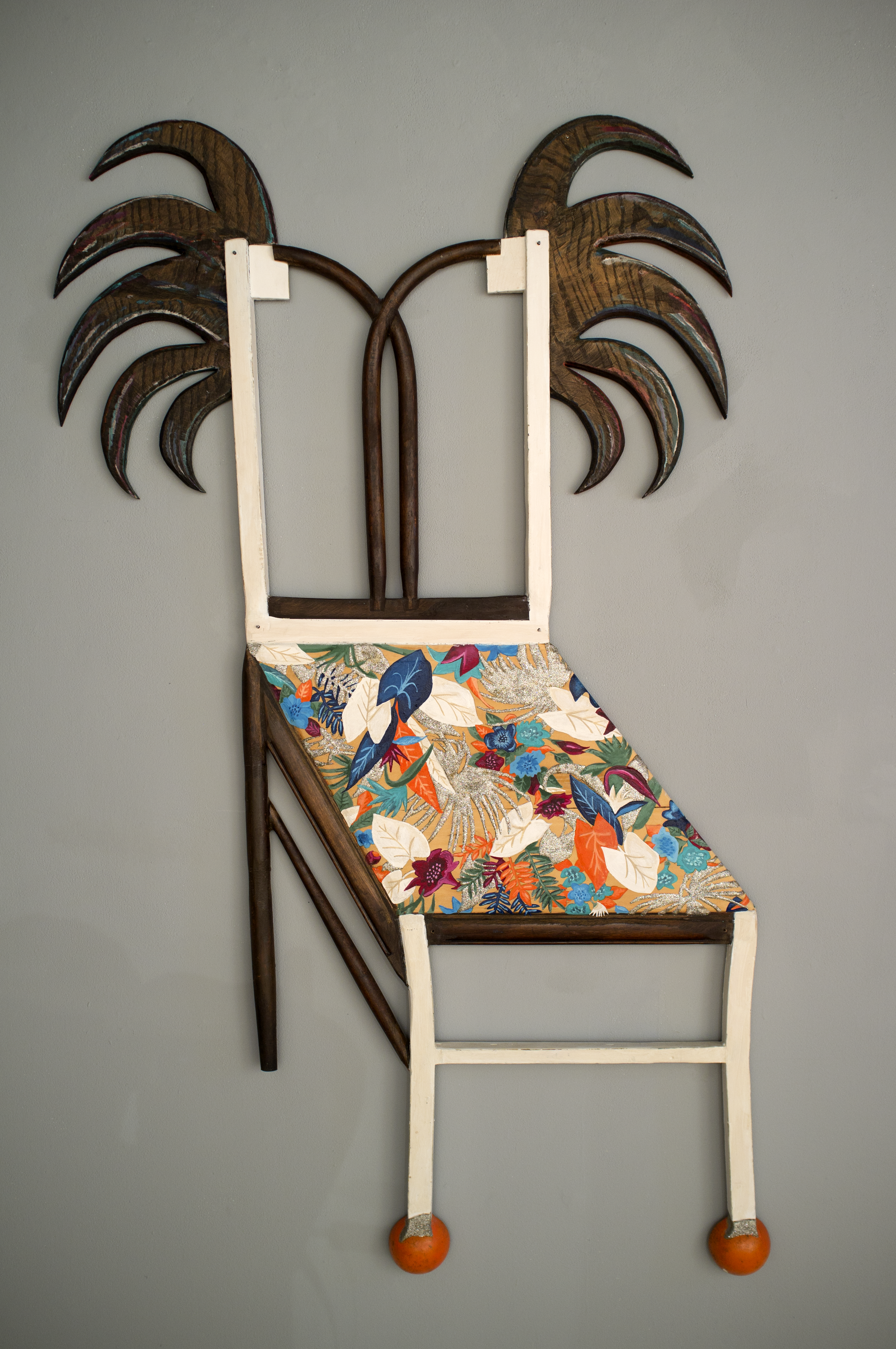
"Essence of Chippendale"

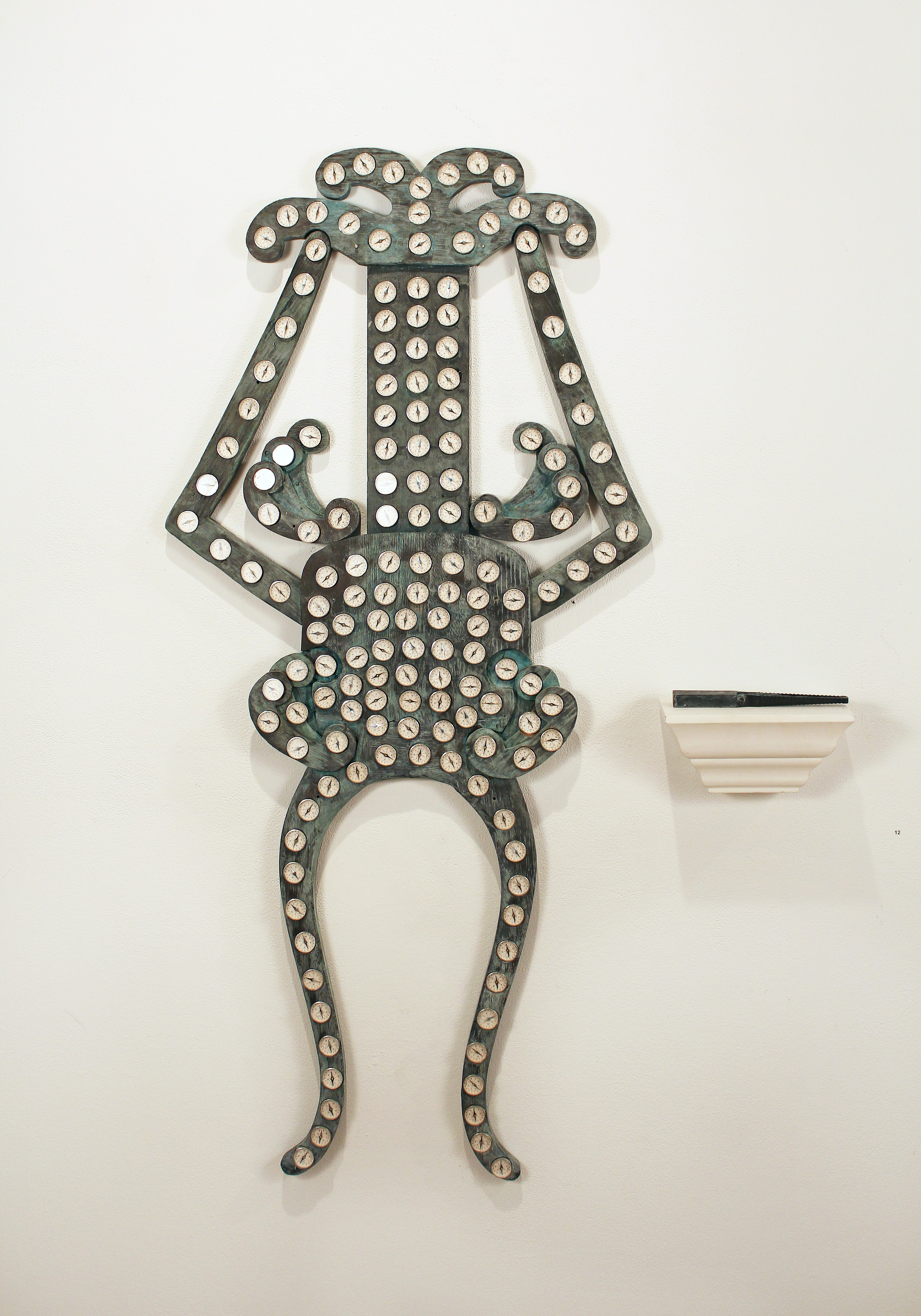
"Bipolar"

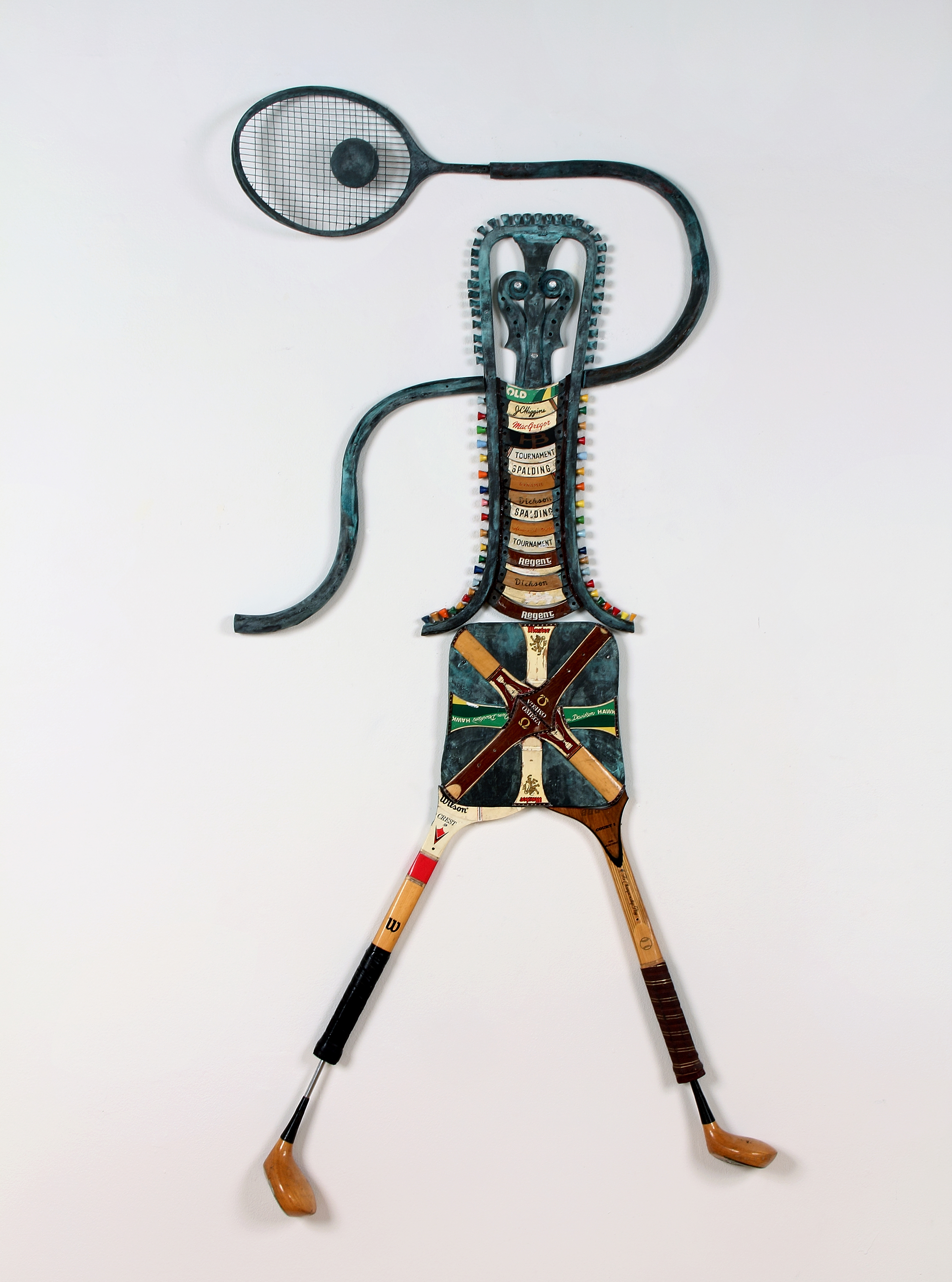
"Different Strokes"

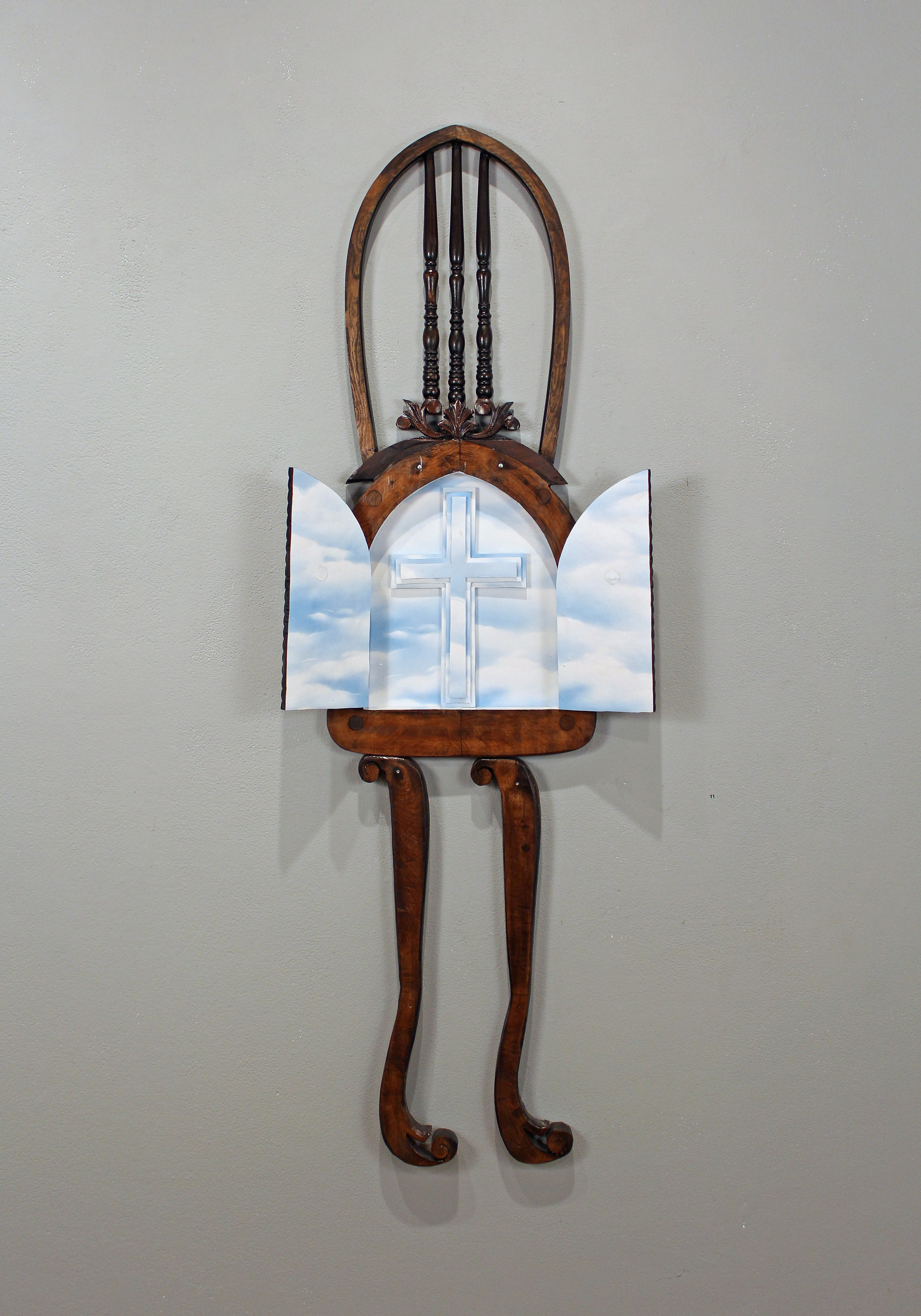
"Chapel Temple"

Margaret Wharton was born in Portsmouth, Virginia in 1943.

She received a degree from the University of Maryland in College Park and worked briefly in advertising before marrying and moving to Bethlehem, Pennsylvania where her husband began working at Bethlehem Steel. After starting a family Wharton became interested in working with steel. She took her first welding course at Moravian College in 1967.

She took classes at the School of the Art Institute, graduating with a B.F.A. in 1975 in sculpture. Wharton is also known for her part in founding Artemesia Gallery in 1972, Chicago’s first all-female art gallery. Featured artists included Hollis Sigler, Phyllis Bramson, Vera Klement, Carole Harmel and Claire Prussian. While Wharton was primarily a welder, she also created sculpture in wood, found objects, and non-traditional materials. Chairs feature prominently in her work.

== Works ==
Wharton's first solo exhibition took place at the Phyllis Kind Gallery in Chicago in 1976. She had eleven more solo shows at the Kind Galleries in Chicago and New York City between 1977 and 1991. In 1981-82 another solo exhibition by Wharton, sponsored by the Museum of Contemporary Art, Chicago, traveled to Texas, Florida, and South Carolina. This exhibition was reviewed in Artforum in January 1982. Her work has been invited to many group exhibitions in the United States and the United Kingdom.

Wharton won the Anna Louise Raymond award in the "Fellowship Show" at the Art Institute of Chicago (1975), and the Logan Prize (1974) in the "Chicago and Vicinity Show" at the same institution. She completed commissions for the Museum of Contemporary Art in Chicago (1985), and the Chicago Public Library, West Lawn Branch (1986). Wharton also has been awarded grants from the National Endowment for the Arts (1980, 1988).

Her work is in major private and permanent collections, including the Art Institute of Chicago and the Museum of Contemporary Art, both in Chicago; the Corcoran Gallery of Art, Washington, DC; the Dallas Museum, Texas; the Madison Art Center, Wisconsin; Seattle Art Museum, Washington; and the Whitney Museum of American Art, New York City.

== Honors, grants, and awards ==
2013	The Adolph and Esther Gottlieb Foundation Individual Support Grant
1999	Illinois Arts Council Grant
1993	National Endowment for the Arts Grant
1988	National Endowment for the Arts Grant
1984	Award in the Visual Arts
1979	National Endowment for the Arts Grant
1972	Founding Member, Artemisia Cooperative Gallery, Chicago, IL

== Solo exhibitions ==
2016	The Magic of Margaret Wharton, Jean Albano Gallery, Chicago, IL
2014	In Memoriam, Jean Albano Gallery, Chicago, IL
2012	Wharton’s World, Jean Albano Gallery, Chicago, IL
2011	Constructions, Jean Albano Gallery, Chicago, IL
2010	Some Assembly Required: A Margaret Wharton Retrospective, South Shore Arts, Munster, IN
2008	The Baseball Show, Jean Albano Gallery, Chicago, IL SOFA Chicago, Jean Albano Gallery, Chicago, IL
2003	Slicing it Thin, Montalvo, Saratoga, CA
2000	Jean Albano Gallery, Chicago, IL; Rockford College Art Gallery, Rockford, IL
1997	Jean Albano Gallery, Chicago, IL
1996	Discordant Voices, Jean Albano Gallery, Chicago, IL
1996	Mixed Media Sculpture, Western Michigan University, Kalamazoo, MI
1995	Margaret Wharton: Potent Objects/A Survey of Work
1994	Experimental Journey, Zolla-Lieberman Gallery, Chicago, IL
1992	Slicing It Thin, Zolla-Lieberman Gallery, Chicago, IL
1991, 88, 85, 80, 76	Phyllis Kind Gallery, Chicago, IL
1990, 87, 83, 81, 79, 78, 77	Phyllis Kind Gallery, New York, NY
1985	Evanston Art Center, IL (through 1995)
1981-82	Margaret Wharton, Museum of Contemporary Art, Chicago, IL; Laguna Gloria Art Museum, Austin, TX; University of South Florida Art Galleries, Tampa, FL; Gibbs Art Gallery, Charleston

== Selected collections ==
- American Medical Association, Chicago, IL
- The Art Institute of Chicago, Chicago, IL
- Arthur Andersen Company, Chicago, IL
- AT&T, Chicago, IL
- Corcoran Gallery of Art, Washington, D.C.
- Dallas Museum, Dallas, TX
- First National Bank, Chicago, IL
- Madison Art Center, Madison, WI
- Milwaukee Art Museum, Milwaukee, WI
- Museum of Contemporary Art, Chicago, IL
- Pennsylvania Academy of the Fine Arts
- Seattle Art Museum, Seattle, WA
- State of Illinois Collection, Chicago, IL
- Union League Club, Chicago, IL
- Whitney Museum of American Art, New York, NY
- Yale University Art Museum
