= Leon Golub =

American painter (1922–2004)

- Born: January 23, 1922; Chicago, Illinois, U.S.
- Died: August 8, 2004 (aged 82)
- Education: University of Chicago (BA); School of the Art Institute of Chicago (BFA, MFA)
- Movement: Monster Roster
- Spouse: Nancy Spero

Leon Golub (January 23, 1922 – August 8, 2004) was an American painter. He was born in Chicago, Illinois, where he also studied, receiving his BA at the University of Chicago in 1942, and his BFA and MFA at the School of the Art Institute of Chicago in 1949 and 1950, respectively.

He was married to and collaborated with the artist Nancy Spero (August 24, 1926 – October 18, 2009). Their son Stephen Golub was an economics professor at Swarthmore College. Their son Philip Golub is Professor of International and Comparative Politics at the American University of Paris and was a longstanding contributing editor of the influential journal Le Monde diplomatique. Their youngest son Paul Golub is a theater director and acting teacher working in France.

== Early life ==
Born in Chicago in 1922, Golub received his B.A. in Art History from the University of Chicago in 1942. Then he was enlisted in the army. From 1947 to 1949, he studied under the G.I. Bill at the School of the Art Institute of Chicago (SAIC). The student body included a large number of vets, including Golub’s one-time flatmate Cosmo Campoli, George Cohen, Theodore Halkin and Seymour Rosofsky, whose work often reflected the horrors of war, as well as the uncertainties of the Cold War and Nuclear age. It was at SAIC that he met the artist Nancy Spero, to whom he was married for nearly fifty years. Golub helped organize and showed in the seminal Momentum Exhibitions of 1948–1949, put together by SAIC and Institute of Design students in protest over their exclusion from the Art Institute’s prestigious "Annual Exhibition by Artists of Chicago and Vicinity." He was also featured, along with Campoli, Halkin and Rosofsky, in the Art Institute’s "Veteran's Exhibition" of 1948. The group included, in addition to Golub’s aforementioned classmates, June Leaf, H.C. Westermann, Irving Petlin, Evelyn Statsinger, Don Baum, and Arthur Lerner.

In Chicago, Golub became involved with other artists collectively dubbed the "Monster Roster" by critic Franz Schulze in the late 1950s, based on their affinity for sometimes gruesome, expressive figuration, fantasy and mythology, and existential thought. They believed that an observable connection to the external world and to actual events was essential if art was to have any relevance to the viewer or society. This is a view that informed Golub's work throughout his career.

Golub, and the group, gained notice in the 1950s, when art historian and curator Peter Selz featured him, Campoli and Cohen in a 1955, ARTnews article, "Is There a New Chicago School?", and included him, Campoli and Westermann in the 1959 Museum of Modern Art (MoMA) exhibition, New Images of Man, as examples of vanguard expressive figurative work in Europe and the United States. In later years, the Monster Roster would be regarded as forerunners to the more widely known Chicago Imagists.

'Interrogation III', acrylic on linen painting by Leon Golub, 1981

'White Squad V', acrylic on linen painting by Leon Golub, 1984

== Career ==
Golub, who always painted in a figural style, drew upon diverse representations of the body from ancient Greek and Roman sculpture, to photographs of athletic competitions, to gay pornography; often pulled directly from a huge database he assembled of journalistic images from the mass media. He likened his painting process to sculptural technique and employed a method of layering and scraping away paint, sometimes using a meat cleaver, leaving varying amounts of canvas untouched, a violently expressionistic style that Golub dubbed 'barbaric realism".

From 1959 through 1964, Golub and his wife, artist Nancy Spero opted to live in Paris, a move occasioned in part by the belief that Europe would be more receptive to their work dealing overtly with issues of power, sexual and political. During this period Golub's work increased in size because of larger available studio space and the inspiration of the French tradition of large-scale history painting. He also switched from using lacquer to acrylics, left more of the surface unpainted, and began to grind the paint directly into the canvas. While in Italy for the year of 1956, both Golub and Spero were profoundly influenced by the figurative works of Etruscan and Roman art, whose narratives addressed ancient themes of power and violence.

When Golub returned to New York from Paris in 1964, the Vietnam War was escalating, and he responded with his two series: Napalm and Vietnam, works that show the vulnerability of the body while also demonstrating the power of modern weapons. Golub's work for his Vietnam paintings were at first titled Assassins, eventually being changed to not attribute the intention of the soldiers. One of his longest works would include that of Vietnam II, with it stretching over twelve meters. He and Spero became active with Artists and Writers Protest, "the first such group to take a public stand against the war". This group would be centered around the organization of anti war activities. In 1967, as part of the group's Angry Arts Week, Golub organized The Collage of Indignation, a collaborative work by over 150 artists which he described as "not political art, but rather an expression of popular revulsion."

Golub had a career breakthrough that same year when he was selected to exhibit five paintings at the Museum of Modern Art's "New Images of Man" show in New York City. His work was included alongside that of such established and rising artists as Willem de Kooning, Francis Bacon and Jackson Pollock.

In the mid-1970s, Golub was beset with self-doubt caused by a lack of interest in his work. Between the years of 1974 to 1976, Golub would cut up and destroy many works he produced up to this period and nearly abandoned painting. In the late seventies, however, over the course of three years he would produce more than a hundred portraits of public figures, with sixty of those portraits having been completed between February and September 1976. His interest in creating these portraits would stem from a resemblance between a young Gerald Ford and a soldier from one of his works, Vietnam III. Among the portraits were political and military leaders, dictators, and religious figures. Leon Golub: Paintings, 1950-2000 includes several portraits of Nelson Rockefeller and Ho Chi Minh, along with images of Fidel Castro, Francisco Franco, Richard Nixon, and Henry Kissinger. Some of these portraits were included in the display 'Leon Golub: Political Portraits' (2016) at the National Portrait Gallery, London.

In the 1980s, Golub turned his attention to terrorism in a variety of forms, from the subversive operations of governments to urban street violence. Killing fields, torture chambers, bars, and brothels became inspiration and subject for work that dealt with such themes as violent aggression, racial inequality, gender ambiguity, oppression, and exclusion. Among the work produced in this period are the series Mercenaries, Interrogation, Riot, and Horsing Around. His Interrogation II (1981; Art Institute of Chicago) is representative of the subject from this period and Golub's technique, "the canvas painted, scraped and repainted many times to create a tense, skinlike surface."

From the nineties to his death, Golub's work shifted toward the illusionistic, with forms semi-visible, and appropriated graphic styles from ancient carvings, medieval manuscripts, and contemporary graffiti. As an older man he began to consider his own mortality, and moved toward themes of separation, loss, and death. Text appeared in many of the paintings combined with a series of symbolic references, including dogs, lions, skulls, and skeletons.

Golub's work was seen in solo exhibitions throughout the world, among them World Wide (1991), a Grand Lobby project at the Brooklyn Museum of Art. For World Wide the artist created a process, repeated in exhibitions at several other museums, by which he enlarged images and details from his paintings and screened them on transparent sheets of vinyl, hung so that they surround the viewer. He was represented in many group exhibitions and was one of the few white artists included in Black Male: Representations of Masculinity in Contemporary American Art at the Whitney Museum of American Art in 1994.

In 1996, Golub was given a commission to design a set of stained glass windows for Temple Sholom in Chicago, the four windows depict the life of Joseph. These would be the only stained glass windows Leon Golub ever did. They were fabricated in New York by Victor Rothman and Gene Mallard.

== 2001: renaissance ==
While Leon Golub's later works from the 1990s offer more fragmented (in his words "left-over") reincarnations of his early messages, it is his larger, carved works, vividly depicting power relations that have re-gained attention with the U.S.'s involvement in Iraq and Afghanistan.

In 2003, Golub revisited his 1959 painting, Reclining Youth, part of a series of paintings inspired by friezes at the Great Altar of Zeus in Pergamon. Working with Magnolia Editions, the artist translated the painting into a large-scale [14-foot-wide (4.3 m)] Jacquard tapestry, his first and only textile work.

== Retrospectives ==
From March to May 2015, the Serpentine Gallery in London held a career retrospective which was "spun off" and presented as a three-floor career retrospective at the Manhattan Hauser & Wirth in June 2015. In 2018, the Metropolitan Museum of Art presented Leon Golub: Raw Nerve featuring his painting Gigantomachy II, as well as paintings from his series, including Pylon, White Squad, Riot, and Horsing Around. In 2022, the Hall Art Foundation, in Reading, Vermont presented a major survey of approximately 70 Golub works from the Hall and Meyer Collections spanning Golub’s career from 1947 to 2003, which traveled to Kunstmuseum Schloss Derneburg in 2023. In 2024, the post-conceptual Black American artist Rashid Johnson curated the survey show Et in Arcadia ego: Leon Golub at Hauser & Wirth in New York City.

== Collections, selected ==
=== Selected public collections ===
- Amon Carter Museum, Fort Worth, Texas
- Art Gallery of Western Australia, Perth, Australia
- Art Institute of Chicago, Illinois
- Baltimore Museum of Art, Maryland
- Bibliothèque nationale de France, Paris
- Blanton Museum of Art, Austin, Texas
- Brooklyn Museum, New York
- Carnegie Museum of Art, Pittsburgh, Pennsylvania
- Cincinnati Art Museum, Ohio
- Des Moines Art Center, Iowa
- Fogg Art Museum, Harvard University, Cambridge, Massachusetts
- Galleria degli Uffizi, Florence
- Hiroshima City Museum of Contemporary Art, Hiroshima, Japan
- Honolulu Museum of Art, Hawaii
- Indiana University Art Museum, Bloomington, Indiana
- Indianapolis Museum of Art, Indiana
- Israel Museum, Jerusalem
- Jewish Museum, New York
- Kent State University, Ohio
- Krannert Art Museum, University of Illinois, Champaign-Urbana
- Los Angeles County Museum of Art, California
- Madison Art Center, Madison, Wisconsin
- Metropolitan Museum of Art, New York
- Miami Art Museum, Florida
- Montreal Museum of Fine Arts, Canada
- Musei Civici di Udine, Friuli, Italy
- Museum of Contemporary Art, Chicago, Illinois
- Museum of Fine Arts, Houston, Texas
- Museum of Modern Art, New York
- National Gallery of Art, Washington, D.C.
- National Gallery of Australia, Canberra
- National Gallery of Victoria, Melbourne, Australia
- Nelson-Atkins Museum of Art, Kansas City, Missouri
- Norton Simon Museum of Art, Pasadena, California
- Smart Museum of Art, University of Chicago, Illinois
- Smithsonian American Art Museum, Washington, D.C.
- Spertus Institute for Jewish Learning and Leadership, Illinois
- Tate Gallery, London, United Kingdom
- Tel Aviv Museum of Art, Tel Aviv, Israel
- Tennessee State Museum, Nashville, Tennessee
- Toledo Museum of Art, Ohio
- University of California, Berkeley, California
- University of Massachusetts Amherst, Massachusetts
- University of North Carolina at Chapel Hill, North Carolina
- Vancouver Art Gallery, British Columbia, Canada
- Vietnam National Museum of Fine Arts, Hanoi
- Whitney Museum of American Art, New York

=== Selected private foundations ===
- Eli Broad Family Foundation, Los Angeles, California
- Hall Collection

=== Selected private collections ===
- Saatchi Collection, London
- Gene R. Summers, Chicago
- Ulrich Meyer and Harriet Horwitz, Chicago
- T.C. Williams II, Santa Fe, New Mexico

== Films and videos ==
- Golub / Spero, DVD from Kartemquin Films, Chicago, Illinois, 2006 (which includes Golub: Late Works are the Catastrophes; Woman As Protagonist: The Art of Nancy Spero; Artemis, Acrobats, Divas and Dancers: Nancy Spero in the New York City Subway)
- Golub: The Late Works Are the Catastrophes, a film by Kartemquin Films, Chicago, Illinois, 2004
- Golub, a film by Kartemquin Films, Chicago, Illinois, 1988 (previewed New York Film Festival, 1988)
- State of the Art: Ideas & Images of the 1980s, Program 5, TV Film Channel Four, London, England, 1987
- Victims, Media Environment with Nancy Spero and Werner Wada, Rod Rodgers Dance Company
- The Mercenary Game, a documentary film by Alain d'Aix et al., The RadioTelevision du Quebec, 1983

== Bibliography ==
- Bird, Jon, “Leon Golub: Echoes of the Real”, London, Reaktion Books, 2000.
- Bird, Jon, “Leon Golub Powerplay: The Political Portraits”, London, Reaktion Books, 2016.
- Golub, Leon, “Leon Golub: Bite your Tongue”, London, Serpentine Gallery, 2015.
- Marzorati, Gerald, "A painter of darkness: Leon Golub and our times", New York, Viking, 1990.
- Murphy, Patrick T., "paintings, 1987-1992, curated by Patrick T. Murphy; with an essay by Carrie Rickey", Philadelphia: Institute of Contemporary Art, University of Pennsylvania, 1992.
- Obalk, Hector, "Leon Golub: heads and portraits", Kyoto, Kyoto Shoin, 1990.
