= Artemisia Gallery =

Chicagoan alternative exhibition space and women's cooperative

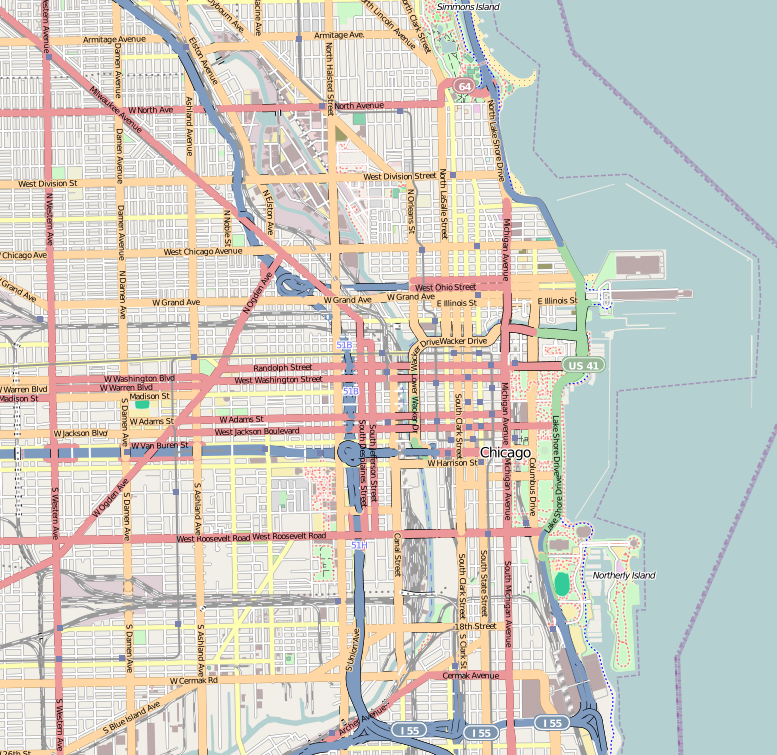
- Location of Artemisia Gallery in Central Chicago Artemisia Gallery (Illinois) Artemisia Gallery (the United States)
- Established: 1973
- Dissolved: 2003
- Location: 700 N. Carpenter St. Chicago, IL 60642
- Coordinates: 41°53′40.6″N 87°39′13.3″W
- Type: Alternative exhibition space

Artemisia Gallery was an alternative exhibition space in Chicago, Illinois, United States, that operated from 1973 until its closure in 2003.

== History ==
The gallery was a cooperative, one of the Midwest's first feminist Cooperative Galleries located in Chicago, Illinois. It was started by 20 women who were frustrated by the lack of opportunities for female artists in Chicago, and opened in the same month as the ARC Gallery, another Chicago women's cooperative. Artmesia was named after Artemisia Gentileschi, an Italian 17th-century artist and painter whose best work was first attributed to her father.

From 1973 to 2003, Artemisia exhibited local, national, and international artists, supporting the careers of over 150 women artists and their mentees. The gallery was an active site for exhibitions, lectures, discussions, artist exchanges, and meetings.

In 1975, the gallery was home to the first meeting of what would later become the Chicago Artist Coalition.

The gallery closed in 2003. Lynne Warren, a curator at the Museum of Contemporary Art, suggested that women had become less drawn to a women's cooperative.

== Programs ==
As due-paying members of the cooperative, each member was granted a show annually in the gallery's exhibition space, and participated in monthly meetings to plan and execute the program.

Members and applicants, guest artists, and educational programs were selected by the gallery's membership, which ranged from 10 to 20 members.

Artemisia Gallery created a video library of interviews from female artists and critics, and established a learning resource center which made information about the role of women in contemporary art available to the public through periodicals, slides, and videotapes. In addition, the gallery also provided a speaker's bureau which offered a mentorship program, and launched a public education pilot program to both promote the role of women in art, and to strengthen links between art and education.

One such program was the "Critical Messages Show", co-curated by Nicole Ferentz and Anita David, displayed featured political posters, recordings, and videos on a range of contemporary issues from women around the country along Chicago train and bus lines.

== Notable members ==
Founders: Barbara Grad, Phyllis MacDonald, Emily Pinkowski, Joy Poe, and Margaret (Harper) Wharton

First Members: Phyllis Bramson, Adrienne Drapkin, Shirley Federow, Sandra Gierke, Carole Harmel, Vera Klement, Linda Kramer, Susan Michod, Sandra Perlow, Claire Prussian, Nancy Redmond, Christine Rojek, Heidi Seidelhuber, Alice Shaddle, Mary Stoppert, and Carol Turchan.
