= Cosmo Campoli =

American sculptor (1922–1997)

- Born: March 21, 1922
- Died: December 15, 1997 (aged 75); Chireno, Texas, U.S.
- Education: School of the Art Institute of Chicago (BFA)

Cosmo Campoli (March 21, 1922 – December 15, 1997) was a Chicago-based sculptor, known for his figurative work centered on the themes of birth and death, and for his use of bold, surreal bird and egg imagery. He was a member of a group of School of the Art Institute of Chicago artists collectively dubbed the "Monster Roster" by critic Franz Schulze in the late 1950s, based on their affinity for sometimes gruesome, expressive figuration, fantasy and mythology, and existential thought. That group included, among others, Leon Golub, George Cohen, June Leaf, H.C. Westermann, Seymour Rosofsky, and Theodore Halkin. Campoli rose to prominence in the 1950s locally and nationally when art historian and curator Peter Selz featured him, Golub and Cohen in a 1955 ARTnews article, "Is There a New Chicago School?", and included him, Golub and Westermann in the 1959 Museum of Modern Art (MoMA) exhibition, New Images of Man, as examples of vanguard expressive figurative work in Europe and the United States. Campoli's work was also shown at the Art Institute of Chicago, the Smart Museum of Art, Beloit College, the Hyde Park Art Center, and in a career retrospective at Chicago's Museum of Contemporary Art in 1971. Campoli was hampered in later years by bipolar disorder.

== Biography ==
Campoli grew up on an Indiana farm near the Illinois border and was from an early age what would later be called an "action" sculptor, infusing energy and life into each piece, mainly in clay, from an early age. He served in World War II, and afterwards, joined a student body at the School of the Art Institute of Chicago composed largely of G.I. Bill vets, including his one-time flatmate Leon Golub, George Cohen, Theodore Halkin and Seymour Rosofsky. Later grouped as the "Monster Roster," they created expressionist, surreal figurative work that often reflected the horrors of war, as well as the uncertainties of the Cold War and Nuclear age. In later years, they would be regarded as forerunners to the more widely known Chicago Imagists.

In 1950, after graduating, Campoli, John Kearney and Golub co-founded Contemporary Art Workshop, a collaborative exhibition space on Chicago's Rush Street that nurtured young talent. Described as "universally adored," Campoli was remembered by Halkin as "a very special kind of person, full of energy and intuition and insight. I think I was jealous of his continuous flow of creativity, and I thought, well, I could catch the disease perhaps." Key figures in promoting Campoli's work at this time included Chicago art dealer Allan Frumkin, University of Chicago alumni, art critic and curator Peter Selz, and Chicago art critic Franz Schulze.

Campoli also taught at the Institute of Design at the Illinois Institute of Technology, where he influenced many subsequent artists and was instrumental in introducing casting techniques to Chicago. His interest was in creating organic, nurturing, rounded "yen" forms, particularly portraying the spirit of birds, other animals, and eggs in bronze, clay, stone, or mixed-media objects such as abstracted birdbaths that became increasingly surreal. Most of his extant works are now in public and private collections, including those of MoMA, the Museum of Contemporary Art in Chicago, and the Smart Museum of Art. In later years, his bipolar disorder manifested and he was unable to keep up a steady pace of work, but continued to teach and exhibit his work.

Campoli was popular in his home neighborhood of Hyde Park, even having a dish, "Pasta Campoli" named after him at a local Thai restaurant. His bronze sculpture, Bird of Peace, which was included in the Carnegie International Exhibition in Pittsburgh (1964), can be seen near the Murray School in Nichols Park in Hyde Park. Although he was recognized with a retrospective survey at the Museum of Contemporary Art, Chicago, and featured prominently in a Smart Museum of Art exhibit and book, Monster Roster: Existential Art in Postwar Chicago, some believe Campoli's has been under-appreciated and largely forgotten.

== Exhibits and career ==
Campoli exhibited actively in the late 1940s and 1950s. He participated in the seminal Momentum Exhibitions of 1948-1950, organized by SAIC and Institute of Design students in protest over their exclusion from the Art Institute's prestigious "Annual Exhibition by Artists of Chicago and Vicinity." He was also featured, along with Golub, Halkin and Rosofsky, in the Art Institute's "Veteran's Exhibition" of 1948. In the early 1950s, he began to show at Allan Frumkin's downtown Chicago gallery, and was part of Frumkin's 1956 show, "Chicago Imagist Painters and Sculptures," organized at Beloit College. In the 1959 show, "Images of Man" show at MoMA in New York, he exhibited his well-known and representative work, The Birth of Death, among other notable artists such as Karel Appel, Alberto Giacometti and Golub. Critics have described the sculpture as a merging of Campoli's twin themes of birth and death into a singular unity. Critic Franz Schulze characterizes Campoli's work displaying a "consistent lyricism," "ambition and technical command," that consciously combined 20th-century influences with "archetypal imagistic ideas."

In later decades, Campoli would be exhibited with the Chicago Imagists, for example at the Hyde Park Art Center's "The Chicago School: 1948-1954 (1964). He also appeared in group shows at the Museum of Contemporary Art in Chicago, including its "Art in Chicago: 1945-1995" survey, and was given a major career retrospective there in 1971.

Later, Compoli and Dutch artist Sonja Weber Gilkey originated and curated (with other associates) a groundbreaking exhibit called "Spumoni Village" in the Chicago gallery 1134.

== As instructor ==
John M. Grzywacz said this about Campoli: "He was a really remarkable man if you were open to a vital life. I took a class with him at the ID in 1955... I remember a project we were to make something sculptural out of found materials... I went searching the streets and came back with pocketfulls of broken glass. I melted the glass in a ladle with an acetalyn torch... after much experimentation I managed to salvage a piece after improvising a cooling system... still the piece was in the ladle... Cosmo looked into my little set up often... In frustration I tried to tap the sculpture out of the ladle. Unfortunately it broke... Cosmo didn't say anything until I got into the class room for the crit... he explained to the class what a dummy I was... not accepting the ladle as part of the piece. It was an important lesson for an 18-year-old. I also remember his edible sculpture process which I discovered when I visited the school in 1972."

A. Beardsley said this about Campoli "Cosmo was always the teacher despite how young you were. When I was a child in the late 1970s I would go to Cosmo's house and he would give me glitter, glue, paint, and other interesting objects to adorn his front yard. As a child I felt it was a magical place, and his involvement in my life lead me to the arts. He was always the teacher!"
