= Hollis Sigler =

American painter (1948–2001)

- Born: Suzanne Hollis Sigler; March 2, 1948; Gary, Indiana, U.S.
- Died: March 29, 2001 (aged 53); Prairie View, Illinois, U.S.
- Education: Moore College of Art and Design (BFA); School of the Art Institute of Chicago (MFA)

Hollis Sigler (March 2, 1948 – March 29, 2001) was an American artist. She received several Arts Lifetime Achievement awards as both an artist and an educator, including the Distinguished Artist Award for Lifetime Achievement from the College Art Association in 2001.

== Early life and education ==
Sigler was born Suzanne Hollis Sigler in Gary, Indiana to Philip Sigler and Marilyn Ryan Sigler. Her family moved to Cranbury, New Jersey when she was eleven. She completed grade school and high school there, receiving her diploma from Hightstown High School in 1966.

Sigler was interested in art as a child and began painting in elementary school. She went on to study art at Moore College of Art in Philadelphia, where she was awarded the Bachelor of Arts in 1970; she completed graduate studies at the School of the Art Institute of Chicago, where she received the Master of Fine Arts in 1973. She had early success with a series of photo realist paintings that depicted underwater swimmers but by 1976, in a gesture meant to repudiate what she considered a male-dominated style, she abandoned realism entirely in favor of a faux-naïve approach. Her subject matter, presented in a way that suggested the work of an untutored or naïve artist, focused on a woman's world-view. A tendency toward autobiographical content was evident even at the early stages of what would become her signature style.

== Artistic career ==
Sigler's mature artistic style was faux-naïve, featuring paintings whose subjects, furniture, and clothing set in doll-house type interiors and suburban landscapes were stand-ins for the implicitly female figure. You Can't Always Get What You Want (1978), in the collection of the Honolulu Museum of Art, is an example of the artist's doll-house interiors painted in a faux-naïve style. She always names her works with a weighty title, like She Always Thought She Was Wrong (1982) and Good Times Just Passing Through (1983).

=== Feminist Art ===
In the late 1970s to the early 80s, Sigler's early works were focused on the personal struggle of a woman, and works focused on her lesbian identity. Then in 1985, after Sigler was diagnosed with breast cancer, the subject matter began to change. She began to reflect on what was happening in her life by including quotations or phrases on the painting, showing her emotions and some facts about her disease. Her faux-naïve style remained the same; the bright-colored illustrations framed by her script seem to be pleasant, but looking up close to the paintings, there are houses ablaze, angels ascending to heaven, things that reflected her life experience living with cancer.

Sigler received several Arts Lifetime Achievement awards.

=== Let Me Love You in Fleshy Colors ===
Sigler's paintings from the 1970s reflect the prominence of Chicago Imagist figuration, which influenced by Expressionism, Surrealism, Pop Art, and California Funk. Like many other feminist artists, Sigler creates works that explored the female bodies, sexualities, and identities. Let Me Love You in Fleshy Colors painted in 1977 is the domestic scene of a bathroom with two ambiguous figures in a shower. It is illustrated with bright colors, and the sex ambiguous figures embrace in the warmth created by the colors that represents their love. The painting provides a new reference to create art from the female artist's perspective, and not by the white, heterosexual male gaze. Sigler often identifies the obscure figures as "She" and "The Lady" in the titles of her paintings and drawings.

=== Breast Cancer Journal ===
In 1999 Sigler published Breast Cancer Journal, a pictorial journal with a series of sixty paintings tracing her struggles with breast cancer. The brightly colored interiors and vividly imaged natural scenes seldom contain human figures. The paintings represent illness through the depiction of rooms, houses, and landscapes that are almost always unoccupied. Elements like fire and flood are common in her paintings as the metaphor for her pains. For example, in Maybe It Was in Something I Ate?, a chair is placed in the center of an empty room, and the wall is charred by flames. Sigler incorporated the facts she had learned about breast cancer, as well as a range of emotions from women experience diagnosis, treatment, surgery, and recovery, into her art.

Many works in this series had been shown in exhibits across the country, and some reproductions have been hung on numerous hospital walls through a program sponsored by the Society for the Arts in Healthcare.

== Effect of cancer diagnosis and illness on art ==
In August 1985, Sigler diagnosed with breast cancer at 37 and the cancer returned in 1991. The artist underwent a mastectomy and chemotherapy, but by 1993 the cancer had spread to her bones, pelvis and spine. Breast cancer ran in Sigler's family; her great-grandmother, Sarah Anna Truitt Ryan, died of the disease and Sigler's own mother, diagnosed with breast cancer in 1983, succumbed to it in April 1995.

After her cancer diagnosis, Sigler produced a series of five vitreograph prints in the fall of 1985 at Littleton Studios in North Carolina, as the first art works dealing with her illness. The prints titled When Choice isn't Possible, Forever Unobtainable, Needing to Make a Change, She still Dreams of Flying, and There is Healing to be Done, introduced a darker side to the artist's woman-oriented works. Almost a decade after those works were produced, Sigler noted in a 1994 interview that she thought the images in her paintings would change as she changed; instead, while the content of her work changed, her imagery remained the same.

In an interview published in Chicago's New Art Examiner, Sigler said that she realized that she would eventually die of breast cancer, and this knowledge had changed the way she approached her art. In 1992 she began her series of paintings Breast Cancer Journal: Walking with the Ghosts of My Grandmothers. Intensely personal, the vividly colored works portray unpeopled scenes where women's clothing (dresses, aprons, corsets, gloves and stockings), furniture (including chairs, beds and vanities) and antique sculptures (including the Nike of Samothrace and the Venus de Milo) are surrogates for the artist. Embued with a life of their own, they enact the emotional responses of the artist to her illness. These paintings could be shockingly forthright. In a review of the 1993 exhibition "The Breast Cancer Journal: Walking with the Ghosts of my Grandmothers" at the National Museum of Women in the Arts, journalist Lee Fleming wrote of the content of one painting in particular:

The glorious Nike of Samothrace, "Winged Victory," stands in armless profile atop a shallow fiery-hued tumulus not unlike a breast. Red rain falls; a bloodied, paving-stone path encirles the mound like a scar. The ground inside and outside this red-gray line is littered with discarded contemporary and antique clothes, all of which share a bleeding cutout where one breast would be...

The paintings could also embody the artist's vision of the spiritual human being triumphing over the ordeal of breast cancer. Lee Fleming cites To Kiss the Spirits: Now this is What it is Really Like, as an example of a painting that "sums up Sigler's struggle in a glorious apotheosis... ."

The lower part of the composition shows a night time village of small houses with glowing windows. A description from the National Museum of Women in the Arts notes that:

the upper two thirds of the canvas pay homage to Vincent Van Gogh's Starry Night. At the center of the picture, bathed in celestial light the silhouetted "Lady" rises effortlessly along a fluted staircase, changing color from purple through rose to white as her arms slowly lift upward to become an angel's wings.

Sigler's companion of 21 years was the jewelry designer Patricia Locke.

== Teaching career ==
You Can't Always Get What You Want by Hollis Sigler, Honolulu Museum of Art

In 1978, Sigler became a member of the Columbia College Chicago faculty in the department of Art and Design. As a teacher, she was up to date on issues in contemporary art and had a talent for communicating this knowledge to her students. She was also fond of taking her students on field trips to learn first hand about influences in art from the European-based collections at the Art Institute of Chicago to the anthropologically-based exhibits at the Field Museum.

Sigler's teaching awards included the College Art Association's Artist Award for Lifetime Achievement in early 2001.

Among the public collections holding work by Hollis Sigler are the American Academy of Arts and Letters (New York), the Art Institute of Chicago, the Baltimore Museum of Art, the Contemporary Arts Center (Cincinnati, Ohio), the High Museum of Art (Atlanta, Georgia), the Honolulu Museum of Art, the Indianapolis Museum of Art, the National Gallery of Art (Washington, DC); the National Museum of Women in the Arts (Washington, DC), the Madison Museum of Contemporary Art, the Museum of Contemporary Art, Chicago, the Seattle Art Museum and the Spencer Museum of Art (University of Kansas).

== Exhibitions ==
- Seattle Art Museum, Washington
- Whitney Museum of American Art, New York
- National Museum of Women in the Arts, Washington, DC
- Museum of Contemporary Art, Chicago, Illinois
- Steven Scott Gallery, Baltimore, Marylabd
- Barbara Gladstone Gallery, New York
- Andrew Kreps Gallery, New York
- Carl Hammer Gallery, Chicago, Illinois
- David Barnett Gallery, Milwaukee, Wisconsin
- Madison Museum of Contemporary Art, Madison, Wisconsin
- American Academy of Arts and Letters, New York
- Art Institute of Chicago, Chicago, Illinois
- Bates College, Lewiston, Maine
- Pennsylvania Academy of the Fine Arts, Philadelphia, Pennsylvania
- Goshen College, Goshen, Indiana
- Smithsonian American Art, Washington, DC
- Maurine Littleton Gallery, Washington, DC
- Spraightwood Galleries, Upton, Maine
- University of Wisconsin, Madison, Wisconsin
- Stair Galleries, Hudson, New York
- Minneapolis Institute of Art Collection, Minneapolis, Minnesota
- Indiana University, Bloomington, Indiana
- University of Saint James, Anguilla and St. Vincent
- Whitney Museum of American Art, New York

== Personal life and death ==
Sigler was openly lesbian.

She died of breast cancer on March 29, 2001, at the age of 53, at her home in Prairie View, Illinois.
