= Vera Klement =

American artist (1929–2023)

Vera Klement (December 14, 1929 – October 20, 2023) was an American artist, and Professor Emerita at the University of Chicago. She was a 1981 Guggenheim Fellow.

== Education and career ==
Klement graduated from Cooper Union in 1950. She taught at the University of Chicago from 1969 to 1995.

In 1973, Klement was a founding member of Artemisia Gallery, one of the Midwest's first feminist Cooperative Galleries located in Chicago, Illinois.

She was a 1981 Guggenheim Fellow.

In 1987, she showed art at the Renaissance Society. She was the 2003 visiting artist at Goshen College, and 2007 artist in residence at Indiana State University.

There is an eleven-minute American documentary film about her, titled Vera Klement: Blunt Edge (2010).

Her work is in the collection of the state of Illinois, the Kentucky Center for the Performing Arts, and the Krannert Art Museum.

The Archives of American Art in Washington, D.C. holds the Vera Klement papers.

== Personal life ==
Born Vera Klementovna Shapiro in Danzig, Klement was a Holocaust survivor.

She later lived in Chicago. She was married twice, first to Werner Torkanowsky, an Israeli violinist, and later to composer and conductor Ralph Shapey.

Klement died on October 20, 2023, of complications from cancer and COVID-19 in Evanston, Illinois.
