= Christina Saj =

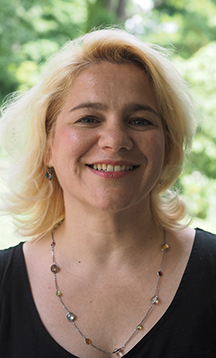
- Born: 1967 (age 58–59); Syracuse, New York, U.S.
- Education: Sarah Lawrence College, BA, 1988, Bard College, MFA, 1992
- Known for: Contemporary spiritual and religious icons
- Website: christinasaj.com

Christina Saj (/saɪ/; Ukrainian: Христина Сай; born 1967) is a Ukrainian American artist living and working in New Jersey. She is known for her paintings bridging traditional Byzantine iconography and contemporary art. She has created icons in the modern vernacular.

== Biography ==
Christina Saj is a first generation American, whose family immigrated to the US after World War II from Ternopil, Ukraine. Saj was born in Syracuse, New York and grew up in Montclair, New Jersey, where she returned after completing her undergraduate and graduate studies.

== Education and early career ==
Saj earned a BA in Fine Art in 1988 from Sarah Lawrence College in Bronxville NY, followed by an MFA in Painting from the Milton Avery Graduate School of the Arts at Bard College, Annandale on Hudson in 1992; she also studied Byzantine Art History at Wadham College, Oxford University, and spent time at SACI in Florence, Italy. Early in her career she learned traditional techniques of icon painting using egg tempera (a medium that employs pure pigment ground with an emulsion of egg and water) on a ground of levkas, while studying precepts of Byzantine Iconography with Petro Cholodny the Younger, whose icons can be found in Lourdes, Rome and in NY.

Despite traditional training, Saj has often used found or unconventional materials in her work such as wood, metal, glass, collage elements and mixed media. Her works are often based on traditional prototypes and recognisable objects of worship.

== Style and technique ==
Saj is a prolific artist who produces intimate work and large scale paintings for architectural projects. In her 1997 solo exhibition “Remembering Myth” Saj explored the realization that all cultures search for spiritual meaning and began to pursue universal symbols with broad spiritual concepts.

Saj's work features strong compositions, and a palette that suits decorative effects and ornamentation. Her two-dimensional works merge representation with abstraction to create mystical spaces. She imbues the work with influences from traditional folk art, Ukrainian embroidery patterns, pysanka designs, and traditional religious iconography. A 1991 series made with industrial metal screens reduced her subjects to the purest geometric forms using subtle changes in texture and color to achieve definition. When exhibiting these works, Saj sometimes offered a traditional illustration and/or a biblical reference alongside it.

Some of Saj's early explorations were collage paintings that incorporated human x-rays she collected from a medical office. The use of puzzle-pieced skeletons referenced reliquaries, bones, and living beings in real time. This use of x-rays addresses the figure inside and out thus capturing the essence of the human spirit. Saj's work links the modern with the ancient.

== Exhibitions and collections ==
Saj's work has been exhibited at venues such as the Ukrainian Museum, Union Theological Seminary, the Marian Library at University of Dayton, Museum of Biblical Art (NYC), the Washington National Cathedral, the Cathedral of St. John the Divine, The Museum of Cultural Heritage (Kiev, Ukraine), Andrey Sheptytsky National Museum in (Lviv, Ukraine), and the Ukrainian Institute of Modern Art in Chicago.

The Arts and Embassies Program selected her Tree of Life series for the Qatar Embassy in Doha, Qatar.

In 2019, the Ukrainian Museum in NYC invited Saj to do a public engagement installation project for them. REcreate, an installation consisting of 12 large panels with moveable parts invited museum goers to co-create works by reassembling removable pieces with the artist. The magnetized paintings turned passive viewers into co-creators, encouraging them to think about composition the way artists do. Participants posted their creations with the hashtag #RecreateAtUM which turned their artworks into an online exhibition on Instagram.

In 2021, The Ukrainian Museum exhibited the Saj's response to COVID-19 titled “Finding Sanctuary During the Pandemic,” a collection of paintings on vinyl records that lined a wall in the lobby and an adjacent gallery to dramatic effect: The circular forms provided a sacred space at a stressful time to demonstrate that even amid the chaos, there is beauty, and there is art.

== Publications ==
Saj's work has been published in the New England Review, WovenTale Press, Our Life Magazine, The Christian Century, Literature and Medicine, and Civa: Voices, and Liturgical Press.

In 2015 Augsburg Fortress of 1517 Media, the official publishing house of the Evangelical Lutheran Church in America (ELCA) commissioned Saj to create a Tree of Life Series for their Sundays and Seasons collection.

== Curatorial work ==
Saj was the founder and director of ARTspace 129 a gallery in Montclair NJ (2004–2007). She curated and presented 6 exhibitions of regional artists annually.

== Residencies ==
In 2022, she was awarded a residency at the Elizabeth Foundation for the Arts in New York City.

In 2008, as part of a residency Saj created an installation of the Six Days of Creation at New Brunswick Theological Seminary which was installed in the sanctuary on the New Brunswick campus.

== Selected solo exhibitions ==
Lucky Charms, Talisman of a former life 81 Leonard Gallery, NYC 2023

Finding Sanctuary: Painting thru the Pandemic, Ukrainian Museum, NYC 2022

Sacred Space: Art as Sanctuary, First Presbyterian Church, Ann Arbor MI 2022

Longing For What Belongs to Us FreshAirMontclair, 73 See Gallery, Montclair NJ 2020

RE:create – Christina Saj's Transformative Paintings, Ukrainian Museum, NYC 2019

Cruciform, Central Presbyterian Church, Atlanta GA 2014

Let the Angels Sing! 5th Avenue Presbyterian, New York, NY 2012

Chorus of Angels, Christ Church Episcopal, Glen Ridge NJ 2011

Angels, Shepherds and Kings Central Presbyterian Church, Atlanta GA 2011

On a Wing and A Prayer, Columbia Theological Seminary, Decatur, GA 2011

Images of Faith, Grantham Church, Grantham, PA 2010

Form Seeking Expression, Marian Library, University of Dayton, Dayton OH 2010

The Six Days of Creation, New Brunswick Theological Seminary, Rutgers University, NJ 2008

Visions and Imaginings, artpsace 129, Montclair, NJ 2006

Lisova Pisnia, Ukrainian Education Cultural Center Gallery, Philadelphia PA 2004

The Tree of Life, American Embassy, Doha, Qatar thru 2006

Words and Images, works on paper The Rosalind & Alfred Lippman Gallery, Temple B’nai Jeshurun Short Hills, NJ 2003

Indomitable Spirit: Paintings of Faith, Hope and Remembrance The Interchurch Center NY, NY 2001

The Guiding Spirit, The Bible Technologies Conference, Chantilly, VA 2000

The Corporate Landscape, Brodsky Gallery, Chauncey Conference Center, Princeton, NJ 2000

Painted Prayers, St. James Chapel, Union Theological Seminary, Columbia University, NY, NY 2000

Drawing on Inspiration, Midland Gallery; Montclair, NJ 1999

Music as Art/Art as Music, Central Presbyterian Church, Montclair, NJ 1999

Celebration of Faith, Central Presbyterian Church, Montclair, NJ 1997

Remembering Myth, Midland Gallery; Montclair, NJ 1997

Allegories, The Lobby Gallery, Deutsche Bank, New York, NY 1995

Saints, Kings and Prophets, The Lobby Gallery, Deutsche Bank, New York, NY 1995

Contemporary Icons, Norbert Considine Gallery, Stuart Country Day School, Princeton, NJ 1994(8)

New Painting, Ukrainian Canadian Art Foundation, Toronto, Canada 1993
