= Central Presbyterian Church =

Central Presbyterian Church may refer to:

in Canada

- Central Presbyterian Church (Hamilton)

in the United States

- Central Presbyterian Church (Little Rock, Arkansas), listed on the NRHP in Arkansas
- Central Presbyterian Church (Denver, Colorado), listed on the NRHP in Denver, Colorado
- Central Presbyterian Church (Atlanta, Georgia), listed on the NRHP in Georgia
- Central Presbyterian Church (Anneslie, Towson, Maryland)
- Central Presbyterian Church (St. Paul, Minnesota), listed on the NRHP in Minnesota
- Central Presbyterian Church (Montclair, New Jersey), listed on the NRHP in New Jersey
- Central Presbyterian Church (New York City)
- Central Presbyterian Church (Chambersburg, Pennsylvania)
- Central Presbyterian Church (Amarillo, Texas), listed on the NRHP in Texas
- Central Presbyterian Church (Austin, Texas)
- Central Presbyterian Church (Waxahachie, Texas), listed on the NRHP in Texas
- Second Presbyterian Church (Columbus, Ohio), also known as Central Presbyterian Church
