= Kostiantyn Milonadis =

Ukrainian-American sculptor (1926–2012)

- Костянтин Мілонадіс
- Born: 5 June 1926; Kremenchuk, now Poltava Oblast, Ukraine
- Died: 13 March 2012 (aged 85); Niles, Michigan, U.S.
- Education: Art Institute in Chicago, Tulane University in New Orleans
- Occupation: Sculptor

Kostiantyn Milonadis (Ukrainian: Костянтин Мілонадіс; 5 June 1926 – 13 March 2012) was a Ukrainian-American sculptor.

== Biography ==
Konstantyn Milonadis was born on 5 June 1926, in Kremenchuk (now Poltava Oblast).

In 1951, he emigrated to the U.S. In 1957, he graduated from the Art Institute in Chicago, and in 1959, from Tulane University in New Orleans (with J. Ricky as his professor). From 1960 to 1974, he worked as a professor at the University of Notre Dame in South Bend. He was one of the initiators of the establishment of the Ukrainian Institute of Modern Art in Chicago.

He died on 13 March 2012, in Niles, Michigan.

== Creativity ==
From the 1960s, he has presented his works at American exhibitions. He is the author of kinetic wire sculptures, including "Kvitka" (1959), "Khvylya" (1964), "Maiatnyk" (1980s), and "Korabel" (1997). For his works, Milonadis used bronze, wood, and stone. Some of his works are held in the collections of the Museum of Contemporary Art in Chicago.

== Bibliography ==
- Костянтин Мілонадіс: Мистець повинен розвивати себе по горизонталі та по вертикалі // Образотворче мистецтво. — 2005. — № 3.
- Мілонадіс Костянтин: каталог виставки / текст В. Качуровського. Чикаго: Укр. Ін-т модерного мистецтва, 1973. — 12 с.
