= Colette Bangert =

American computer and visual artist (born 1934)

Colette Stuebe Bangert (born 1934, Columbus, Ohio) is an American artist and new media artist who has created both computer-generated and traditional artworks. Her computer-generated artworks are the product of a decades-long collaboration with her husband, Charles Jeffries "Jeff" Bangert (1938–2019), a mathematician and computer graphics programmer. Bangert's work in traditional media includes painting, drawing, watercolor and textiles.

== Early life and education ==
Colette Bangert attended Shortridge High School in Indianapolis, Indiana, from 1948 to 1952. In 1952 she enrolled at the Herron School of Art and Design in Indianapolis, where she majored in painting and lithography and graduated with a BFA in 1957. She earned an MFA in Painting and Drawing from Boston University (1958). In Boston she met Charles Bangert, then a student in Mathematics at Harvard University. They married in 1959.

== Career ==
=== Work in traditional media ===
Early in her career, before her work in digital media, Bangert's paintings and drawings received critical attention. Her work in drawing, watercolor, painting and textile has continued throughout her life. The algorithmic methods she and her husband developed for creating digital prints arose from her practice of drawing and in turn influenced her work in traditional art media. The midwestern landscape of North America permeates her work, though it may simply be evoked by the treatment of lines and the organization of space. Lines and space can be analyzed, described, and generated by programming code: In her collaboration with Jeff, the computer extended their understanding of "what a drawing about landscape can be." Throughout her career Bangert has continued to exhibit both streams of work.

=== Computer-generated work ===
Beginning in 1967, Bangert's collaboration with her husband produced a series of "algorithmic drawings", which have been extensively documented and collected. The earliest work was created at the University of Kansas Computer Center in Lawrence, Kansas, and output to a plotter, the Draft-O-Matic. Colette's signature "CB" signaled the collaborative nature of their work. Seeking out the Bangerts at the University of Kansas in 1968, sculptor Robert Mallary described their collaboration as a process whereby Jeff as a programmer "enabled the computer to plot endless simulations of the kinds of drawings and paintings that Colette was creating by hand in her studio." Software allowed them "to explore the relationships between algorithmically defined numerical functions and the drawing."

The Bangerts viewed the computer both as tool for research into the nature of the world and as a collaborator in the production of art. An artist made a drawing by laying down lines on paper, impelled by the mind's insight into visual form. A plotter made a drawing by laying down lines on paper, impelled by the mind's insight into mathematical form. If the algorithmic form was modeling the artist's drawn line and, like the artist, creating series of images, suites of variations, then it too was engaged in finding "what the making of a drawing is about regardless of its medium." If the artist was engaged in discovering and recreating the forms of the natural world, then the computer was also engaged in discovering and recreating them—or as the Bangerts declared, "Computer grass is natural grass."

In the 1970s and 1980s the Bangerts actively participated in a burgeoning culture of digital art presented in museum shows and traveling art shows and published and discussed in scholarly conferences and journals. Their computer-based methods and attitude towards their medium emerged within and were shared by a new generation of digital artists. Computer scientist Frank Dietrich's essay "Visual Intelligence: The First Decade of Computer Art (1965–1975)" locates the Bangerts' work within the cross-pollinating conversations and art production of this early period. If the earliest "computer art" was marked by geometric precision and pattern-making, created largely by artists without formal training—many were scientists or engineers, not a few were anonymous programmers—the following generation developed more "natural" forms and were frequently trained as artists. As art historian Grant Taylor has noted, "The symmetry and precision that gave 1960s computer art a mechanistic appearance shifted toward inexactness and disorder." Colette's studies of grass, transformed into algorithmic functions, became fields and prairies of computer-generated grass in the Land Lines series of the 1970s. In works like Large Landscape: Ochre & Black (1970), Grass Series (1979–1983), Circe's Window (1985) and Katie Series (1986–1987), modular elements such as lines, curves, and shapes were modified by affine transforms and blending algorithms and arranged by chance operations and spatial-ordering algorithms to produce abstract landscapes and naturalistic patterns. Art historian and artist Ruth Leavitt noted the influence of this approach on her own work.

The early algorithmic drawings were primarily concerned with the drawn line and its location in the space of the drawing. In the early works, modeling and transforming of modular lines and their location in a recursively subdivided space often result in dense textures of lines throughout the pictorial space. Later works such as Dawn Study (1989) and Dawn's Leaf (1989) present empty space and areas of flat color as essential compositional elements. Recursive spatial division returns as a theme in the "mud crack" series Three A, Three B, and Three C of 2004, and the related print On the Ground (2005). Images such as AC2923 IAM=4 (2008) turn in a new direction, concerned with reduction of composition to basic elements, arrayed vertically. This compositional simplicity enters a new phase, a return to the horizontal lines of landscapes coupled with a diaphanous veils of color, in the prints from The Plains Series II (2012), the last digital works produced by the Bangerts.

=== Reception ===
Her first New York City solo show, of work in traditional media, took place at the Krasner Gallery in 1963 and was reviewed in ARTnews and Arts Magazine—in the latter, notably, by Donald Judd—and mentioned in Time magazine and the New York Times. By the 1970s the Bangert's work was appearing in numerous art shows of computer-generated art, including the 1970 art show the Association for Computing Machinery (ACM), presented in New York City for its 25th annual conference. There the Bangert's work was awarded first prize. Times art critic John Canaday found the work "appealing" in its "sensitivity," but dismissed the attempt to model the artist's hand drawn line as facile and lacking the essential qualities of Bangert's work in other media.

During the 1970s, several museum shows included Colette and Jeff Bangert's work. It also figured in traveling art shows sponsored by professional organizations such as ACM and IEEE, and in scholarly conferences. The second edition of the art gallery in the ACM's Special Interest Group on Graphics, SIGGRAPH, in 1981 in Dallas, Texas, included their work, as did SIGGRAPH's 25th year anniversary show in 1998. Herbert Franke, a pioneer of computer graphics and digital art in Europe, published a gallery of the Bangerts' work in Angewandte Informatik, a scholarly journal of applied informatics.

Bangert's role as a woman new media artist allied her with other women in field such as Lillian Schwartz, Vera Molnar, and Joan Truckenbrod. She was active in the Women's Caucus for Art in Kansas City, and exhibited work in Womanhouse.

Though images of her collaborative work with her husband are now the best documented aspect of her work, her drawing, painting and textile work were also widely exhibited throughout her career. Much of the work in "old media" reveals the same procedural approach as the algorithmic work—and in the Bangerts' telling, only the choice of tools separated them, not their philosophical underpinnings.

== Work ==
=== Selected solo exhibitions ===
1963, Krasner Gallery, New York City. Recent paintings.

1966, Mulvane Art Museum, Topeka, Kansas. Recent paintings.

1971, Mulvane Art Museum, Topeka, Kansas. Computer drawings.

1982, Lawrence Gallery, Kansas City, Missouri. Grass and other computer drawings, 1967–1982.

1984, Albrecht-Kemper Museum, St. Joseph, Missouri. Between Earth and Sky: A twenty-year painting survey.

2002, Lawrence Art Center. Lawrence, Kansas. From The Garden Series: Work on Paper and Thread Pieces.

2016, Kansas City Artists Coalition, Kansas City, Missouri. Alone and Together: Colette And Jeff Bangert A Retrospective.

=== Selected group exhibitions ===
1970, Nelson-Atkins Museum, Kansas City, Missouri. New Directions in Media: Computer and Laser Art.

1970, Association for Computing Machinery, New York City. National Exhibition of Computer Art. First Prize. Cover of ACM Journal.

1974, Montreal Museum of Contemporary Art, Montreal, Canada. Le Musée Cybernétique, international exhibition.

1974, The Kitchen, New York City. Second International Computer Art Festival Exhibition.

1977, Lowe Art Gallery, Syracuse University, Syracuse, New York. Computer Genesis: A Vision of the 70's.

1977, Womanhouse, Women's Caucus for Art, Los Angeles, California. Contemporary Issues: Works by Women on Paper.

1977, Sony Hall, Ginza, Tokyo, Japan. International Computer Art Exhibition.

1980, Ukrainian Institute of Modern Art, Chicago, Illinois. Art In-Art Out: Computer-Aided Graphics.

1980, Traveling Artmobile, Bucks County Community College, Newton, Pennsylvania. Computer Art Exhibition.

1981, Second SIGGRAPH Art Exhibition, Dallas, Texas. Traveled to Flavio Belli Gallery and Ontario College of Art.

1986, SIGGRAPH '86, Dallas, Texas. A Twenty Year Retrospective of Computer Art and traveling exhibition.

1987, Everson Museum of Art, Syracuse, New York. Computers and Art, with book/catalog Digital Visions by curator Cynthia Goodman. Digital Visions: Computers and Art

1998, SIGGRAPH '98, Orlando, Florida. 25 Year Art Exhibition Celebration, invited artist.

2004, Spencer Museum of Art, University of Kansas, Lawrence, Kansas. Women/Modern Art.

2008, Block Museum of Art, Northwestern University, Evanston, Illinois. Imaging by Numbers: A Historical View of the Computer Print.

2012, Spencer Museum of Art, University of Kansas, Lawrence, Kansas. Cryptograph: An Exhibition for Alan Turing.

2013, Spencer Museum of Art, University of Kansas, Lawrence, Kansas. Then and Now: Women Artists in the Spencer Museum of Art.

2015, Ukrainian Institute of Modern Art, Chicago, Illinois. all.go.rhythm, four person exhibition of algorithmic art. ALL.GO.RHYTHM

2017, Art House, Santa Fe, New Mexico. 50 Years of Women and Systems Art.

2017, RCM Galerie, Paris, France. Pioneers in Computer Art: Digital Art from the 1960s and 1970s.

2018, Victoria and Albert Museum, London, England. Chance and Control.

2019, Amon Carter Museum of American Art, Fort Worth, Texas. Traces: Women and Abstraction in the 20th Century.

=== Collections ===
- Kunsthalle Bremen, Bremen, Germany
- Mary and Leigh Block Museum of Art, Northwestern University, Evanston, Illinois
- Mulvane Art Museum, Washburn University, Topeka, Kansas
- Museum of Modern Art, New York City
- Spencer Museum of Art, Lawrence, Kansas
- Victoria and Albert Museum, London, England
- Carl & Marilynn Thoma Art Foundation, Chicago, Illinois and Santa Fe, New Mexico

== See also ==
- Visual arts of the United States
- Colette Bangert Works at the Block Museum
