= Truckenbrod =

Truckenbrod is a surname. Notable people with the surname include:

- Jens Truckenbrod (born 1980), German footballer
- Joan Truckenbrod (born 1945), American artist
