= Aka Pereyma =

Ukrainian-American artist (1927–2013)

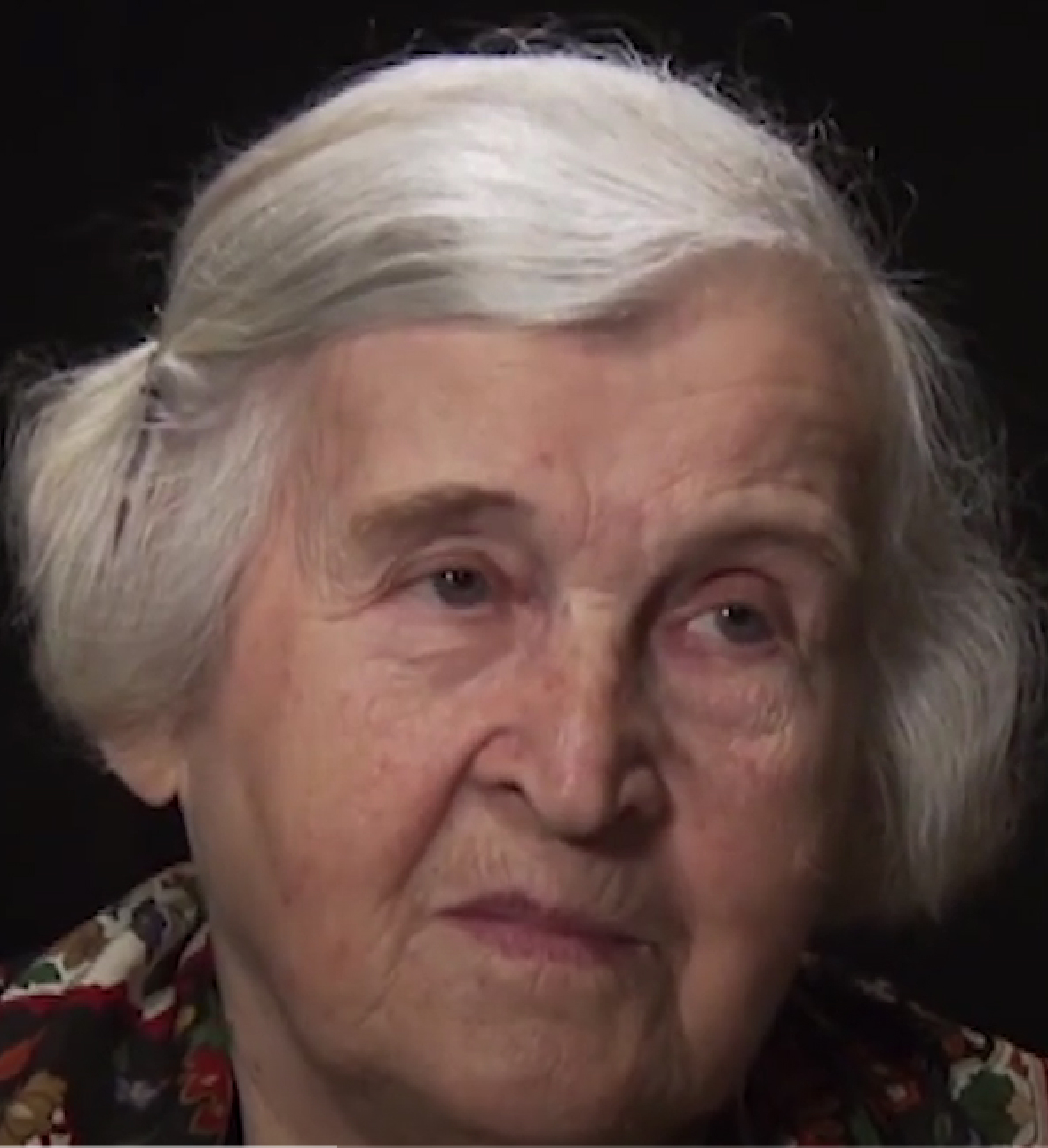
- Born: September 30, 1927
- Died: December 9, 2013 (aged 86)
- Style: modernist folkloric art

Armenia "Aka" Bohumyla Pereyma (Ukrainian: Ака Перейма) was a Ukrainian-American artist working in Ohio, (1927–2013) who incorporated modern style and folk imagery tied to her Ukrainian roots in her painting and sculpture as well as being a master of the art of pysanky.

== Biography ==
Pereyma was born in Siedlce, Poland, the daughter of Ukrainian school teachers, Andrij and Paulina (Elijiw) Klym. In 1940 they moved back to Ukraine and until 1944 lived in Kholm and Sokal, Ukraine, later emigrating to Austria and Germany. She met her husband Dr. Constantine Pereyma in Germany, where both were students. Early in their marriage, when her children were small she was living in Brooklyn, she began visiting museums In 1959, she and her husband relocated to Troy, Ohio. From 1960 to 1963, attended the School of the Dayton Art Institute, studying painting; in 1963–1964 focused on ceramics at the School of the Art Institute of Chicago. She received her BFA (sculpture) from the Dayton Art Institute in 1966.

She began painting after moving to Troy in 1959. From 1970 to 1980, she was the artist coordinator for the Welding for Artists Program at the Hobart School for Welding Technology in Troy.

== Exhibitions ==
Peremya's work has been exhibited at the Ukrainian Museum, The Marian Library, Cincinnati Contemporary Arts Center, Troy-Hayner Cultural Center and the Ukrainian Institute of Modern Art in Chicago. Her ceramic works are in the collections of the Kopychyntsi and Poltava (Ukraine) cultural centers.

In 2024 The Dayton Art Institute mounted a posthumous survey exhibition The Artistic Life of Aka Pereyma exploring her career from the early 1960s into the 21st century. It included over 160 works in a wide variety of media: paintings, drawings, wood and metal sculptures, needlework, woodblock prints, ceramics and pysanky eggs. Pereyma's themes included Ukrainian folk images, depictions of birds, Adam and Eve (along with leaves and eggs) to symbolize men and women. Pereyma's works tell stories, through visually dense compositions, rich in color and ornament.

== Awards and honors ==
In 2001, Pereyma was awarded the “Outstanding Ukrainian Artist” medal from the Ukrainian government in 2001 for her contribution to Ukrainian culture.

In 2003 she was awarded an Ohio Heritage Fellowship for Material Culture for work significant in Ohio and Midwestern Ukrainian communities and her work in the Ukrainian pysanky, decorated egg tradition.
