= The New York Group of Poets =

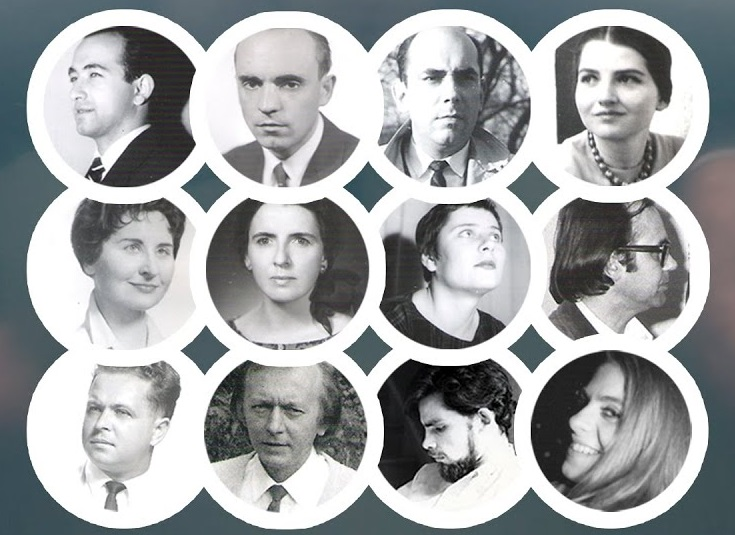
Collage of the New York Group

The New York Group of Poets (also: The New York Group of Ukrainian Poets, or The New York Group; Ukrainian: Нью-Йоркська група; N'iu-Iorks'ka hrupa) was a literary movement of Ukrainian refugee modernist poets (and artists) that first gathered in New York City during the mid-1950s, imbuing Contemporary Ukrainian literature with avant-garde ideas and with new poetic forms. The poets eagerly experimented and embraced fashionable artistic and philosophical trends as surrealism, magic realism, and existentialism. While the label "New York Group" commonly refers to seven founding members, namely Bohdan Boychuk, Yuriy Tarnawsky, Bohdan Rubchak, Zhenia Vasylkivska, Emma Andijewska, Patrytsiia Kylyna (a pen name of Patricia Nell Warren), and Vira Vovk, it also includes five poets who joined the founders of the group more than a decade later: George Kolomyiets, Oleh Kowerko, Marco Carynnyk, Roman Babowal, and Maria Rewakowicz. These latter poets betrayed the same inclination toward metrical experimentation and display continuity in themes.

The New York Group's most active period spans approximately fifteen years, from the mid-1950s until the early 1970s and coincides with the publication of its annual poetry almanac Novi poezii (New Poetry). In 1990 Boychuk and Rewakowicz, in cooperation with the Writers' Union of Ukraine, founded a literary magazine Svito-vyd in Kyiv, which continued publishing until 1999. The most iconic thematic innovations introduced by the New York Group Drew inspiration both from recent Spanish poetry and from the Latin American boom while incorporating play elements, urban motifs, and erotica.

The phenomenon of the New York Group provides an interesting study for exploring cultural and aesthetic ramifications of writers in exile. Having settled mostly in the United States, the poets welcomed their émigré condition, which freed them from the constraints of both Socialist Realism and Censorship in the Soviet Union, while also nurturing their links with their homeland by continuing to write poetry in their mother tongue. They sought to pay tribute to the literary history of their language, while also incorporating the formal and thematic innovations of literature within the Free World. In fact, some critics drew parallels between the poets of the New York Group and the poets of the Beat Generation, although, arguably, the New York Group displays more affinity with the European modernist tradition, New Formalism, and the New Narrative movements than with other American post-World War II literary movements.

== Membership ==
The group was created by Bohdan Boychuk and Yuriy Tarnawsky, with Bohdan Rubchak joining soon after.

=== Poets ===
- Zhenia Vasylkivska
- Emma Andijewska
- Patricia Kylyna (Patricia Nell Warren)
- Vira Vovk
- Maria Rewakowicz
- Georges Kolomyiets
- Oleh Kowerko
- Marco Carynnyk
- Roman Babowal

=== Artists ===
- Bohdan Pevny
- Slava Gerulak
- Jurij Solovij
