= Oleh Koverko =

Ukrainian and American poet (born 1937)

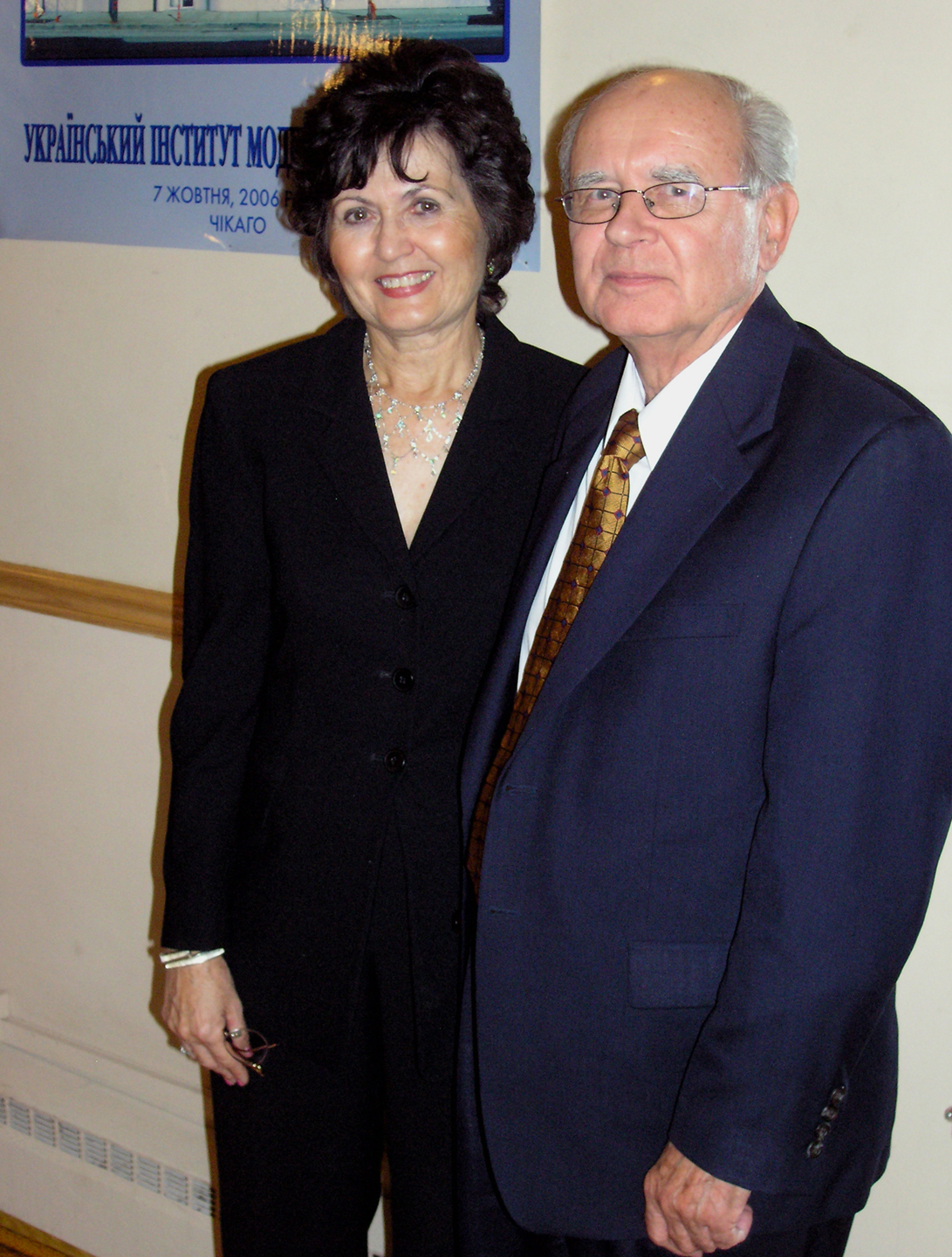

Oleh Kowerko (Ukrainian: Олег Коверко; born May 7, 1937) is a Ukrainian and American poet. He is a member of the New York Group of Poets. He served as a President of the Ukrainian Institute of Modern Art (UIMA).

== Life and career ==
He was born in Vaha, a village near Pidhaitsi, Ternopil region. He completed secondary education in New York City and a college degree at the University of Chicago in general literature. In 1971 he was one of the founders of the Ukrainian Institute of Modern Art (UIMA). He served in multiple positions: 1971–1974, treasurer; 1974–1992 and 1995-200 president; 2007– secretary. He left the literary scene in the 1970s. He lives in Chicago, Illinois.

== Poetry ==
His first poems were published in the mid-1960s, in the second poetry collection Slovo from the Ukrainian Writers Association, Modernity (Suchasnist) and New Poetry journals in 1965. Oleh Kowerko is an author of two books of poetry in Ukrainian:

- Eskizy nad viddallyu (Sketches over Distance) in 1966,
- Vtecha (Escape) in 1969.
