= Thomas H. Kapsalis =

American artist (1925–2022)

- Born: May 31, 1925; Chicago
- Died: July 14, 2022 (aged 97)
- Resting place: Elmwood Cemetery
- Occupation: Painter, sculptor, university teacher (1954–1975)
- Employer: School of the Art Institute of Chicago
- Works: Eleven or K
- Position held: instructional staff (1954–1961), assistant professor (1961–1975), professor emeritus (1975–2022)

Thomas Harry Kapsalis (May 31, 1925 – July 14, 2022) was a professor at the School of the Art Institute of Chicago and a leading American abstract painter and sculptor.

== Personal life ==
Thomas Harry Kapsalis was born to Adamantia and Harry Kapsalis on May 31, 1925 in Chicago, Illinois. He married Stella (née Manos) Kapsalis around 1956. They had two children together. Kapsalis was drafted into the United States Army during World War II in 1944, where he fought at the Battle of the Bulge and was captured as a prisoner of war. Prior to being conscripted into the Army, he was halfway through pursuing his Bachelor's degree from the School of the Art Institute of Chicago.

== Career ==
After returning from the war, Kapsalis returned to the School of the Art Institute of Chicago to earn a Bachelor's degree in 1949 and Master's degree in 1957 utilizing the G.I. Bill. In 1956 he was an active member of the American Association of University Professors. He received a Fulbright-Hays Fellowship to study with Willi Baumeister in Stuttgart from 1953-1954. He worked as an instructor in painting and drawing at the School of the Art Institute of Chicago starting in 1954, was promoted to Assistant Professor in 1961, and retired in 1975. He later became a Professor Emeritus.

His art work was featured in "Chicago and Vicinity" - an annual exhibition that featured work from Artists in Chicago - in 1956, 1960, 1969, and 2016. In the early 1970s, Kapsalis' work was in a two-year exhibit sponsored by the Illinois Arts Council, which consisted of 4 paintings from 24 different Illinois based painters.

Some have called his work that of Modernism. He appreciated the work of Kathleen Blackshear and Katherine Kuh. Kapsalis described the style of his work as moving from expressionistic realism to figurative abstraction and finally to non-objective abstraction. He said "I never explain my work in literal terms because I am creating something visual." His abstract paintings are often quite colorful, but for a period he painted without color and only in black and white to protest the Vietnam War. He continued to paint and exhibit into his 90s.

In 2009, Kapsalis appeared as the main subject of the documentary tryphon: three sounds, produced by the CUENTOS Foundation and premiered at the Brauer Museum. In that same year, he published a book titled Thomas H. Kapsalis : Artist's House : Paintings & Sculpture 1947-2008.

In 2011, Kapsalis' work - along with that of Ralph Arnold, Vera Klement, Ellen Lanyon and others - was displayed in the Illinois State Museum's exhibit Luminous Ground: Artists With Histories, which was open until January 2013. In 2013, his work was on display at the Ukrainian Institute of Modern Art. In 2015, his work was again exhibited at the Ukrainian Institute of Modern Art in the exhibit Chicago Connection: Artists from the Post-War Period alongside Seymour Rosofsky, Eleanor Coen, and Arthur Lerner. From January - March 2018, Kapsalis' work put on display by Art Design Chicago in an exhibit titled Thomas H. Kapsalis: Black + White, etc. From May to June 2020, Kapsalis' work was displayed on an online exhibit titled Thomas H. Kapsalis: Eight Decades sponsored by Corbett vs. Dempsey in honor of Kapsalis' 95th birthday.

== Death ==
Thomas H. Kapsalis died on July 14, 2022. He is buried in Elmwood Cemetery.

== Collections ==
Kapsalis' work is held in the permanent collections of the National Gallery of Art, the Minneapolis Institute of Art, the Art Institute of Chicago, the Illinois State Museum, and the Ukrainian Institute of Modern Art.
