= The Front Runner (novel) =

Novel by Patricia Nell Warren

- First edition front cover
- Author: Patricia Nell Warren
- Cover artist: Bill Tinker
- Language: English
- Genre: Novel
- Publisher: William Morrow & Company, Inc., New York (First edition)
- Publication date: 1974
- Publication place: United States
- Media type: Print
- Pages: 346
- ISBN: 0-688-00235-8
- Followed by: Harlan's Race (1994)

The Front Runner is a 1974 novel by Patricia Nell Warren. A love story between a running coach and his star athlete, The Front Runner is noted for being the first contemporary gay novel to achieve mainstream commercial and critical success.

== Synopsis ==
Harlan Brown is the athletic director at the fictitious Prescott College, a progressive, experiential, private liberal arts college in New York. (Note: The nearest community is said to be Sayville, which is the correct distance and would locate the college on Long Island. However, the direction to New York City is consistently said to be "down" ("I jumped into my Vega and drove like a madman down to Manhattan," p 210), and NYC is not typically considered "down" from Long Island, which lies east and south of Manhattan. Also, the trips to Fire Island are treated as if they are major excursions, not ordinary events; Sayville is the embarking point for some of the primary ferries to Fire Island, so going there for someone living near Sayville would be almost like going to the corner store. Other elements - significant hills, heavy snow at Thanksgiving, etc. - also imply an Upstate New York location rather than Long Island, which has a more temperate climate than the upstate exurbs of NYC; and Sayville is on the South Shore, which gets even less snow than the rest of the island. See the Sayville and Long Island articles for further information.) A closeted ex-marine, Harlan has left a prestigious coaching position at Pennsylvania State University following false accusations of sexual misconduct from a male student. Fearing exposure, Harlan has buried himself at the obscure college, and given up his dream of coaching Olympic athletes.

As the novel opens in 1974, three star runners — Vince Matti, Jacques LaFont, and Billy Sive — have been expelled from the elite track program at the University of Oregon because they are gay, and wish to transfer to Prescott to train with Brown. Though wary after his experience at Penn State, Harlan agrees to train the athletes, but quickly finds himself falling in love with Billy. Though they manage to suppress their attraction for a few anguished months, the two soon become lovers. When the runners graduate and take teaching positions at Prescott, Billy and Harlan move in together, and later have a commitment ceremony.

Throughout the novel, Harlan's past is revealed in the form of flashbacks. Though attracted only to men all of his life, Harlan marries a girl he impregnated while in college, living a wholly straight life with only occasional furtive, traumatic excursions into the gay underground of pre-Stonewall New York City. After the incident at Penn State, his marriage ends and he is unable to find employment as a coach, and ultimately begins work as a high-priced hustler in Greenwich Village. When Joe Prescott, the founder and president of Prescott College, offers Harlan a position as the college's athletic director, he enthusiastically accepts. Returning to the closet, Harlan devotes himself entirely to coaching.

Harlan's coming out, and Harlan and Billy's coming out as a couple, proves difficult in the intensely homophobic world of amateur sports. Overcoming practically insurmountable opposition and hostility, Billy is able to qualify to race in the 1976 Olympics in Montreal. He wins the gold medal in the 10,000 meter race, and is within meters of winning the 5000 meter race, when he is shot and killed by an anti-gay radical.

Though devastated by Billy's death, Harlan reflects that he spent his entire life wishing that he could one day let himself love someone openly, and was able to find happiness, however briefly, with Billy. Using samples he and Billy had stored in a sperm bank, Billy's close lesbian friend Betsy Heden bears Billy's child, whom she and Harlan raise together.

In an epilogue set in 1978, Harlan has returned to compete in amateur sports as an athlete, competing in and winning the Amateur Athletic Union masters championship at Madison Square Garden.

== Reception ==
The Front Runner was a critical and commercial success upon its release, becoming the first book of contemporary gay fiction to reach the New York Times Best Seller List. In their review, The New York Times called the novel "the most moving, monumental love story ever written about gay life." To date, The Front Runner has sold more than 10 million copies and has been translated into at least nine languages, including Japanese, German, French, Danish, Swedish, Dutch, and Italian; it was the best-selling gay novel published in Spain, and the first gay novel ever published in Latvia.

== Film adaptation ==
Soon after its publication, The Front Runner became a subject of interest for adaptation as a motion picture. The subsequent decades saw a series of producers and directors involved in adapting the film, most notably Paul Newman, as well as Frank Perry, Arthur Allan Seidelman, and Jeremy Larner. None of these efforts resulted in a motion picture. At the time of Warren's death in February 2019, the film rights were transferred to her estate trust.

== Sequels ==
Harlan’s Race, a direct sequel to The Front Runner, was released in 1994, followed by Billy’s Boy in 1997. Warren completed the fourth book in the series, Virgin Kisses, weeks before her death in February 2019. Her books continue to be published by her estate under her Wildcat Press banner.

== International Frontrunners ==
The Front Runner inspired the name-change of a gay running club in San Francisco, "The Lavender-U Joggers". Founded in 1974 in association with the now-defunct Lavender University, the Joggers reorganized in 1978 and changed its name to "The FrontRunners." Over the following decade, it spun off more than 100 FrontRunners clubs throughout the world. The International Frontrunners was founded in Philadelphia in 1999 as an association of the many FrontRunners clubs.
