= Vaha (village) =

Rural locality in Ternopil Oblast, Ukraine

Vaha Вага
- Location in Ternopil Oblast
- Coordinates: 49°18′17″N 25°17′55″E
- Country: Ukraine
- Oblast: Ternopil Oblast
- Raion: Ternopil Raion
- Hromada: Pidhaitsi urban hromada
- Time zone: UTC+2 (EET)
  - Summer (DST): UTC+3 (EEST)
- Postal code: 48005

Vaha (Ukrainian: Вага) is a village in Pidhaitsi urban hromada, Ternopil Raion, Ternopil Oblast, Ukraine.

== History ==
The first written mention of the village dates back to the end of the 18th century.

After the liquidation of the Pidhaitsi Raion on 19 July 2020, the village became part of the Ternopil Raion.

== Religion ==
- St. Michael church (2006, brick).

== Notable residents ==
- Oleh Koverko (born 1937), Ukrainian and American poet

== Sources ==
- (in Ukrainian) Дем'янова І., Пона І., Уніят В., Вага // Ternopil Encyclopedic Dictionary: in 4 v. / editorial board: H. Yavorskyi and other, Ternopil: "Zbruch", 2004, V. 1: А—Й, S. 217—218. — ISBN 966-528-197-6.
