= Patricia Nell Warren =

American writer (1936–2019)

- Born: June 15, 1936; Helena, Montana, U.S.
- Died: February 9, 2019 (aged 82); Los Angeles, California, U.S.
- Other name: Patricia Kilina
- Education: Stephens College; Manhattanville College (BA)
- Occupations: Novelist; poet; journalist
- Years active: 1954–2019
- Employer: Reader's Digest
- Notable work: The Front Runner

Patricia Nell Warren (June 15, 1936 – February 9, 2019), also known by her pen name Patricia Kilina, was an American novelist, poet, editor and journalist. Her second novel, The Front Runner (1974), was the first work of contemporary gay fiction to make the New York Times Best Seller list. Her third novel, The Fancy Dancer (1976), was the first bestseller to portray a gay priest and to explore gay life in a small town.

== Early life and education ==
Patricia Nell Warren was born in Helena, Montana, on June 15, 1936, and grew up in southwest Montana on the Grant–Kohrs Ranch near Deer Lodge. Her parents, Con and Nell Warren, were cattle ranchers; Warren had one brother, Conrad. She began writing at age ten and got her first literary recognition at eighteen, winning the Atlantic Monthly College Fiction Contest with a short story.

Warren earned an associate of arts degree from Stephens College in Columbia, Missouri, in 1955, then a Bachelor of Arts in English in 1957 from Manhattanville College in Purchase, New York.

== Career ==
In 1957, she married Ukrainian emigre poet Yuriy Tarnawsky. Through her marriage, she learned the Ukrainian language and became associated with a group of young Ukrainian emigre poets who became internationally known as the New York Group. As a part of their publishing collective, she began writing and publishing poetry in Ukrainian.

In 1959, Warren was employed by Reader's Digest and worked there for 21 years; she became an editor of both the magazine and the Condensed Book Club. Her first novel The Last Centennial was published by Dial Press in 1971, under the pen name Patricia Kilina, which she also used for her Ukrainian-language poetry. The book was described by Library Journal as "an impressive first novel... almost Faulknerian in its depiction of the despoiling inheritors." She divorced Tarnawsky in 1973 and left the New York Group shortly thereafter.

=== Books ===
In 1974, Warren published her second novel, The Front Runner. Told from the point of view of a gay track coach, the story chronicled his struggle to get a talented openly gay runner on the U.S. Olympic team, and to quash his own growing love for his protégé. The controversial book was the first contemporary gay fiction to make The New York Times Best Seller list. The book sold ten million copies and was translated in ten languages. Two decades later, Warren added two sequels, Harlan's Race (1994) and Billy's Boy (1996). Warren also came out as lesbian in 1974.

As a runner herself, Warren was in 1968 one of the first women to participate in the Boston Marathon. She was part of a group who achieved wider recognition in the U.S. for female marathon runners.

In 1976, Warren published her third novel, The Fancy Dancer. It is the story of a rookie priest in a dying rural parish who falls in love with a proud, mixed-race Native American and white gay man with a criminal record and "unlawful desires." It was the first bestseller to portray a gay priest and to explore gay life in a small town.

In 1978, came Warren's fourth novel, The Beauty Queen. Also published by Morrow, this book was set in the New York City world where she'd spent many years. The story focused on a socially prominent Manhattan businessman, a closeted gay father trying to get up the courage to come out to his daughter, who had become a fiercely anti-gay born-again Christian politician.

=== Later career ===
In 1980, Warren left employment at the Digest to become a full-time writer. She moved back out West to pursue research on her next novel, a Western historical opus. It appeared from Ballantine in 1991 under the title One Is the Sun. Eventually settling in southern California, she made the decision to go independent with book publishing. The result was Wildcat Press, which has published all her books since, including her 2001 novel, The Wild Man, inspired by her years in Spain; she had traveled there regularly during Francisco Franco's regime when she was liaison to the Digest's Spanish edition.

== Politics and activism ==
During the 1990s, Warren became more active politically and in mentoring youth.

Warren created The YouthArts Project, a workshop that allowed LGBT students the opportunity to put their art works, photography, and writings online. The project emerged from an EAGLES art class sponsored by the Los Angeles Museum of Contemporary Art. In 1994, Darin Weeks, a college student in attendance at one of her public lectures, approached Warren about taking the project online in the early days of the World Wide Web. The class expanded to include interested LGBT students in the Los Angeles area, then through an Annenberg grant in 1995, moved to the University of Southern California campus under the guidance of librarian John Waiblinger. The students designed their own web pages, posted their creative works on the YouthArts website, and eventually created an e-zine.

As Warren was selling her literature online and also helping youth produce their work online, Warren became one of 20 plaintiffs in the landmark US Supreme Court case Reno v. American Civil Liberties Union, 521 U.S. 844 under her Wildcat Press publishing company. The case challenged the Communications Decency Act of 1996, and the court overturned it in a unanimous 1997 decision.

In the District Court case that preceded, Warren was asked by Judge Stewart Dalzell how she would be affected by a ruling that the Internet censorship law was constitutional. "What I'm concerned about is that certain people in this country will perceive the entire area of gay literature to be indecent or patently offensive," she told the judges.

In taking the case to the US Supreme Court, the ACLU's Motion to Affirm stated:

Plaintiff Wildcat Press, a publisher of gay and lesbian literature, publishes two electronic magazines on the World Wide Web that are written by and for gay and lesbian youth. Patricia Nell Warren testified that the YouthArts e-zines "provide a creative forum for many youth to discuss their coming out, their experiences with gay life and their sense of their own identity . . . . Many of the contributors openly discuss sex and sexuality, often using slang common to their age group." Decl. of Patricia Nell Warren, at 9, ¶¶21, 23.

Between 1996 and 1999, Warren was appointed as a commissioner of education in the Los Angeles Unified School District, serving on the Gay & Lesbian Education Commission and later the Human Relations Education Commission.

In 2000, Warren was involved in another landmark court case, Ashcroft v. ACLU, which successfully challenged the Child Online Protection Act which attempted to prohibit communications deemed "harmful to minors."

In 2006, Warren hired veteran political consultant Neal Zaslavsky and announced her candidacy for City Council in West Hollywood, CA. Warren was unsuccessful in her run.

== Late life and memorial ==
Warren died of lung cancer on February 9, 2019, at the age of 82 at UCLA Medical Center in Santa Monica after an almost three-year illness.

Warren was also a pioneer in becoming a self-publisher in 1994 through the formation of Wildcat Press. Wildcat Press continues to operate under the loving care of her estate which is managed by Greg Zanfardino. http://www.wildcatpress.com

In June 2019, Warren was one of the inaugural fifty American "pioneers, trailblazers, and heroes" inducted on the National LGBTQ Wall of Honor within the Stonewall National Monument (SNM) in New York City's Stonewall Inn. The SNM is the first U.S. national monument dedicated to LGBTQ rights and history, while The Wall's unveiling was timed to take place during the 50th anniversary of the Stonewall riots.

== Bibliography ==
- A Tragedy of Bees (1960) — in Ukrainian
- Legends and Dreams (1964) — in Ukrainian
- Pink Cities (1969) — in Ukrainian
- The Last Centennial (1971) LOC#77-163583
- The Front Runner (1974) ISBN 0-9641099-6-4
- The Fancy Dancer (1976) ISBN 0-9641099-7-2
- The Beauty Queen (1978) ISBN 0-9641099-8-0
- One is the Sun (1991) ISBN 1-889135-02-X
- Harlan's Race (1994) ISBN 0-9641099-5-6
- Billy's Boy (1997) ISBN 0-9641099-4-8
- The Wild Man (2001) ISBN 1-889135-05-4
- Torero (2004) ISBN 978-3861875956
- My West: Personal Writings on the American West (2011) ISBN 978-1-889135-08-3
- Virgin Kisses (2022) ISBN 978-1-889135-03-8
