= Zhenia Vasylkivska =

Ukrainian poet (1929–2021)

- Native name: Женя Васильківська
- Born: Yevheniia Vasylkivska; 6 January 1929 Kovel, Ukrainian SSR, Soviet Union (now Ukraine)
- Died: 25 April 2021 (aged 92) Washington, D.C., U.S.

Zhenia Vasylkivska (Note: Ukrainian: Женя Васильківська) (born Yevheniia Vasylkivska; (Note: Ukrainian: Євгенія Васильківська) 6 January 1929 – 25 April 2021) was a Ukrainian poet and translator, literary critic, member of The New York Group of Poets.

== Biography ==
She was born in Kovel in 1929. Vasylkivska left Ukraine in 1944. She first lived in the Austrian city of Linz, where she graduated from high school. In 1951, she moved to the United States, where she settled in New York City.

She graduated from the United States with a degree in philology from Columbia University. She soon earned a doctorate in philosophy, defending her dissertation on the French poet Saint-John Perse. In 1968, she married Dr. C.F. Osgood.

After graduation, she taught French in various educational institutions, and later worked as a political consultant for the US government.

Published in New York's New Poetry in 1961 and 1962, she published a collection of original poems "Short Distances" (1959), as well as published translations of mostly French authors (poetry by Jacques Prever, "Antigone" by Jean Anouilh, etc.). She lived in Northern Virginia. Vasylkivska's poems are included in all three anthologies of New York group poets published at this time.

She died of natural causes on 25 April 2021, in Washington.

== Bibliography ==
Own works

- Zhenya Vasylkivska (1959). Short distances. New York: Association of Ukrainian Writers Slovo, 1959. 63 p.
  - (Polish translation) Żenia Wasylkiwska / Short distances (2019). Short distances. Translation from Ukrainian: Tadeusz Karabowicz. Lublin: Episteme. 187 s. ISBN 9788365172822 (bilingual edition: Polish and Ukrainian)

Translations into Ukrainian

Jean Anouilh (1962). Antigone. Introductory article and translation from French: Zhenya Vasylkivska. Munich:?. 64 pages
