= Vasyl Kachurovskyi =

American painter and art historian (1906–2000)

- Василь Качуровський
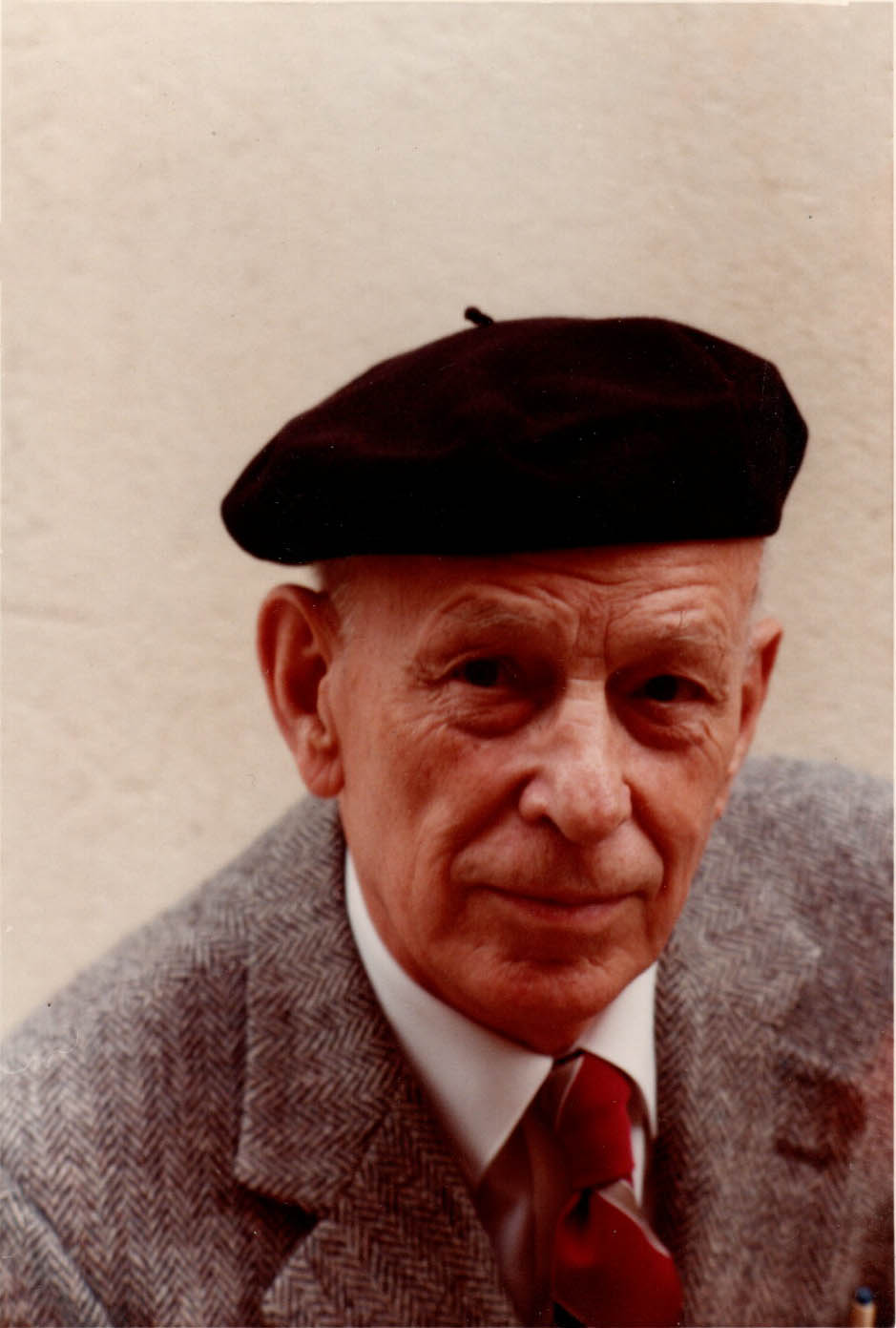
- Born: 1906; Pennsylvania, United States
- Died: 4 May 2000 (aged 95); Chicago, United States
- Education: Mukachevo Commercial Academy, Commercial institute in Prague
- Occupations: Painter and art historian

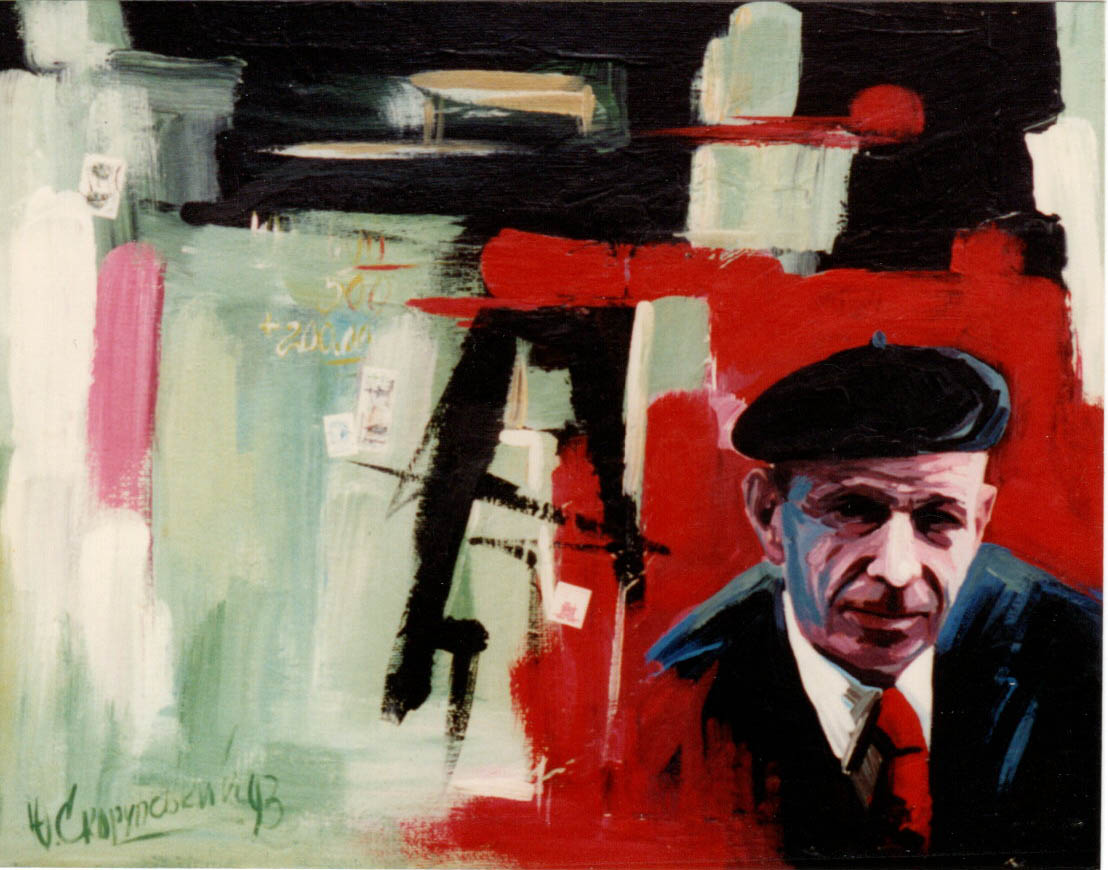
A painting by Yuri Skorupsky dedicated to Vasyl Kachurovskyi

Vasyl Kachurovskyi (Ukrainian: Василь Качуровський; 1906 – 4 May 2000) was an American painter and art historian of Ukrainian descent.

== Biography ==
Vasyl Kachurovskyi was born in 1906 in Pennsylvania.

He studied at the Mukachevo Commercial Academy and a commercial institute in Prague (1930). During 1938 to 1939, he was active in the banking sector and the representation of the Carpatho-Ukrainian government in Prague.

From 1945, he was in Germany, and in 1950, he was in Chicago (United States). From 1971 to 1982, he co-founded and became the first curator of the Ukrainian Institute of Modern Art in Chicago.

== Creativity ==
Kachurovskyi's works are characterized by mood, abstraction, and the simplification of forms, which lead to a philosophical understanding. He was a participant in the "Dolya" group exhibitions. Solo exhibitions took place in Detroit and Chicago (2011, posthumously).
