= Yuriy Tarnawsky =

American poet (1934–2025)

Yuriy Tarnawsky Юрій Тарнавський
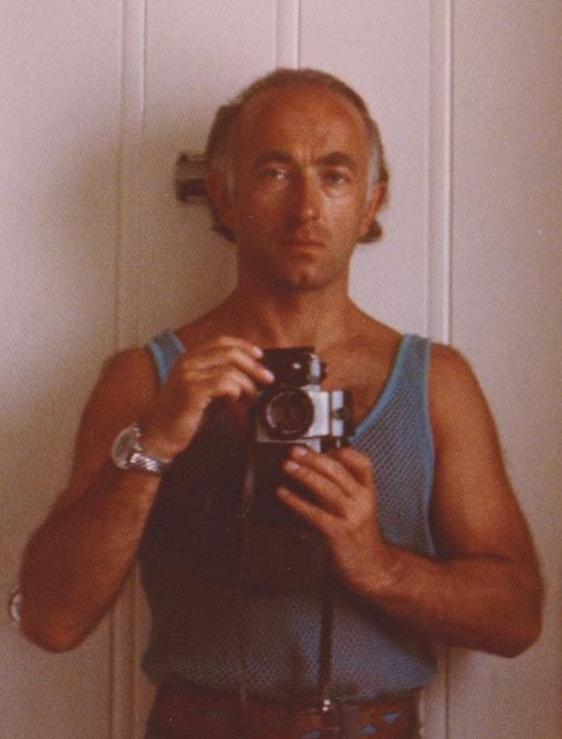
- Self-portrait in the mirror, 1975
- Born: February 3, 1934; Turka, Poland (now Ukraine)
- Died: October 14, 2025 (aged 91); White Plains, New York, U.S.
- Citizenship: United States
- Education: New Jersey Institute of Technology, New York University
- Occupations: Writer, Linguist
- Spouses: P. N. Warren (m. 1957–1973), A. Kmetyk (m. 1979–1993), K. Zalewska (m. 2000)
- Children: Ustya Tarnawsky
- Writing career
- Language: Ukrainian, English
- Period: Contemporary
- Genres: Poetry, Fiction, Drama, Essays, Translation
- Notable works: Three Blondes and Death, The Placebo Effect Trilogy

Yuriy Orest Ivanovych Tarnawsky (Note: Ukrainian: Юрій Орест Іванович Тарнавський, romanized: Yurii Orest Ivanovych Tarnavskyi) (February 3, 1934 – October 14, 2025) was a Ukrainian-American writer and linguist, one of the founding members of the New York Group of Poets, a group of avant-garde Ukrainian diaspora writers, co-founder and co-editor of the journal New Poetry, as well as a member of the US innovative writers' collaborative Fiction Collective. He wrote fiction, poetry, plays, translations, and criticism in both Ukrainian and English.

== Life and career ==
=== Early years ===
Tarnawsky was born on February 3, 1934, in the town of Turka in western Ukraine, at that time under Polish rule. His mother was a school teacher and his father a school principal. He spent 1934 to 1940 in Poland, near the town of Rzeszów, before moving near Sanok and in Turka. In 1944 he emigrated with his family to Germany. After the war, Tarnawsky lived in a Displaced Persons' camp in Neu Ulm, Bavaria where he attended first Ukrainian and then German secondary schools. Tarnawsky graduated from High School in Munich in February 1952, before emigrating with his family to the United States and settling in Newark, New Jersey. There he attended the Newark College of Engineering, now New Jersey Institute of Technology, from which he graduated with honors in 1956 with a bachelor's degree in Electrical Engineering.

=== Professional life ===
Upon graduation, Tarnawsky was hired by the IBM Corporation in Poughkeepsie, NY, and worked there until 1992. At IBM, he worked first as an electronic engineer and then as a computer scientist, primarily in regard to automatic language translation from Russian into English. He managed groups of applied linguists at IBM's Thomas J. Watson Research Center in Yorktown Heights, NY, in the US military school in Syracuse, NY, and at the Library of Congress in Washington, DC. The program developed under his leadership was exhibited at the 1964 World's Fair in New York and was the first in the world to have practical application.

During the years 1964–65, on leave from IBM, Tarnawsky lived in Spain, devoting his time to literary work. Later, while continuing to work for IBM, he studied theoretical linguistics at New York University, obtaining a PhD degree in 1982. His doctoral dissertation Knowledge Semantics in the field of transformational-generative grammar deals with the semantic component within Noam Chomsky's Revised Extended Standard Theory and argues against decompositional semantics. It has been described as being revolutionary in combining the views of Noam Chomsky and Hilary Putnam into one formulation. After completing his linguistic studies, Tarnawsky worked on computer processing of natural languages and the development of artificial ones as well as in the area of Artificial Intelligence.

For his work at IBM he received a number of awards.

He has authored numerous articles on computational and linguistic topics.

After leaving IBM under an early retirement program, Tarnawsky joined the staff of the Harriman Institute at Columbia University in New York City and was a professor of Ukrainian Literature and Culture in the Department of Slavic Languages as well as co-coordinator of Ukrainian Studies (1993–1996).

In 2016, Tarnawsky oversaw the publishing of Knowledge Semantics (Ukrainian: Znannyeva Semantyka) by the National University of the Kyiv-Mohyla Academy. It is the first publication in the field of transformational-generative grammar in the Ukrainian language and is augmented by an extensive English-Ukrainian and Ukrainian-English dictionary in which Tarnawsky developed the basic transformational-generative linguistics terms for Ukrainian.

=== Literary career ===
Tarnawsky is one of the founding members of the New York Group, a Ukrainian émigré avant-garde group of writers, and co-founder and co-editor of the journal New Poetry (1959-1972). While at Columbia University, he was instrumental in founding the archive of the group at the university's Rare Book and Manuscript Library to which he has contributed his papers. His first volume of poetry Life in the City (1956, in Ukrainian), with its urban motifs and concentration on the theme of death, was received by critics as a new word in Ukrainian poetry, such that broke with the language and subject traditions of Ukrainian literature and laid down a path which many of his contemporaries were to follow The declaratively existentialist novel Roads (1961, in Ukrainian), which deals with the life of German youth in post-war Germany, is likewise considered a new word in Ukrainian fiction. The roots of Tarnawsky's early works lie almost exclusively in Western literature, in particular in Hispanic poetry and the poetry of the French pre-symbolists, surrealism, and the philosophy of existentialism. With time, his technical and linguistic background began to exert more and more influence on his literary work, as a result of which it employs a radically new use of language, as for instance in the volumes of poetry Without Spain (1969, in Ukrainian) and Questionnaires (1970, in Ukrainian) and the novels Meningitis (1978, in English) and Three Blondes and Death (1993, in English). In the 1960s Tarnawsky switched fully to writing in English, first in fiction and then in poetry; although in the latter he subsequently made Ukrainian versions of the English-language works (the volume This Is How I Get Well (1978) and the next five collections). He joined the group of innovative American writers Fiction Collective (later FC2) and published with it the novels Meningitis and Three Blondes and Death, both of which received high praise from US critics. (Three Blondes and Death, for instance, was compared by one reviewer to the skyscrapers of Mies van der Rohe and Gropius which towers over the cottages of contemporary American fiction.)

With Ukraine's independence, which came in 1991, Tarnawsky returned to writing in Ukrainian, publishing literary works and articles in the press as well as separate books. His works now show elements characteristic of postmodernism, such as polystylism, collage, pastiche, and the taking on of many, sometimes opposing, stances or masks (for instance, the poetry collection An Ideal Woman (1999), the book-length poem U ra na (1992) and The City of Sticks and Pits (1999), as well as the cycle of plays 6x0 (1998), all in Ukrainian). This process culminates in the publication of a three-volume set of his writings in Ukrainian—6x0 (1998, collected plays),They Don't Exist (1999, collected poetry 1970–1999), and I Don't Know (2000, new version of Roads, excerpts of his English-language books of fiction Seven Tries, and the autobiography Running Barefoot Home and Back). His own Ukrainian-language version of the English-language collection of stories Short Tails that shows the influence of existentialism, absurdism, and postmodernism, was published in Ukraine in 2006. Flowers for the Patient, a book of his selected essays and interviews in Ukrainian, came out in 2012.

In recent years, Tarnawsky has been dedicating himself more and more to writing in English. Thus, 2007 saw the publication of his collection of mininovels (his own genre) Like Blood in Water, and 2011 of the original version of the collection of short stories Short Tails, reformatted and expanded over the Ukrainian-language version. The Placebo Effect Trilogy, three collections of interrelated mininovels—Like Blood in Water (revised edition), The Future of Giraffes, and View of Delft—were published in 2013. The trilogy and its volumes may be viewed as a novel/novels, unified not by characters and events, as is the case in traditional fiction, but by the common topics of existential despair, fear of death, and alienation, which, like motifs in music, bind them into a whole. 2013 also saw the publication of his first book of poetry in many years, Modus Tollens, subtitled "IPDs or Improvised Poetic Devices," which require the reader's active participation and which Tarnawsky calls Heuristic Poetry. Still another collection of his short fictions Crocodile Smiles, subtitled "Short-Shrift Fictions," which extends further the absurdism of Short Tails, was published in 2014 (expanded edition in 2020). One of its stories, "Dead Darling," was previously published in the anthology Best European Fiction 2014 by Dalkey Archive Press. His two 2019 novels have uncharacteristically realistic settings—Warm Arctic Nights is a fictionalized memoir of his early years in Poland and Ukraine, presented in the form of an interview, and The Iguanas of Heat with its detailed US and Mexico settings and ostensibly a suspense story, is a painstaking deconstruction of a sterile marriage. Claim to Oblivion, his book of selected essays and interviews in English, which deal primarily with his own literary works and the issues he tackles in them, was published in 2016. The 2018 book of exercises Literary Yoga effectively illustrates Tarnawsky's views on the craft of writing.

From the end of the 1990s Tarnawsky was active in the U.S. innovative writing community, participating in the AWP and &NOW conferences.

Tarnawsky devoted a lot of energy to translating from Ukrainian into English and from various languages into Ukrainian. Among other works, he is the co-author of the English translation of Ukrainian epic poetry dumy published as Ukrainian Dumy by Harvard Ukrainian Research Institute in 1979.

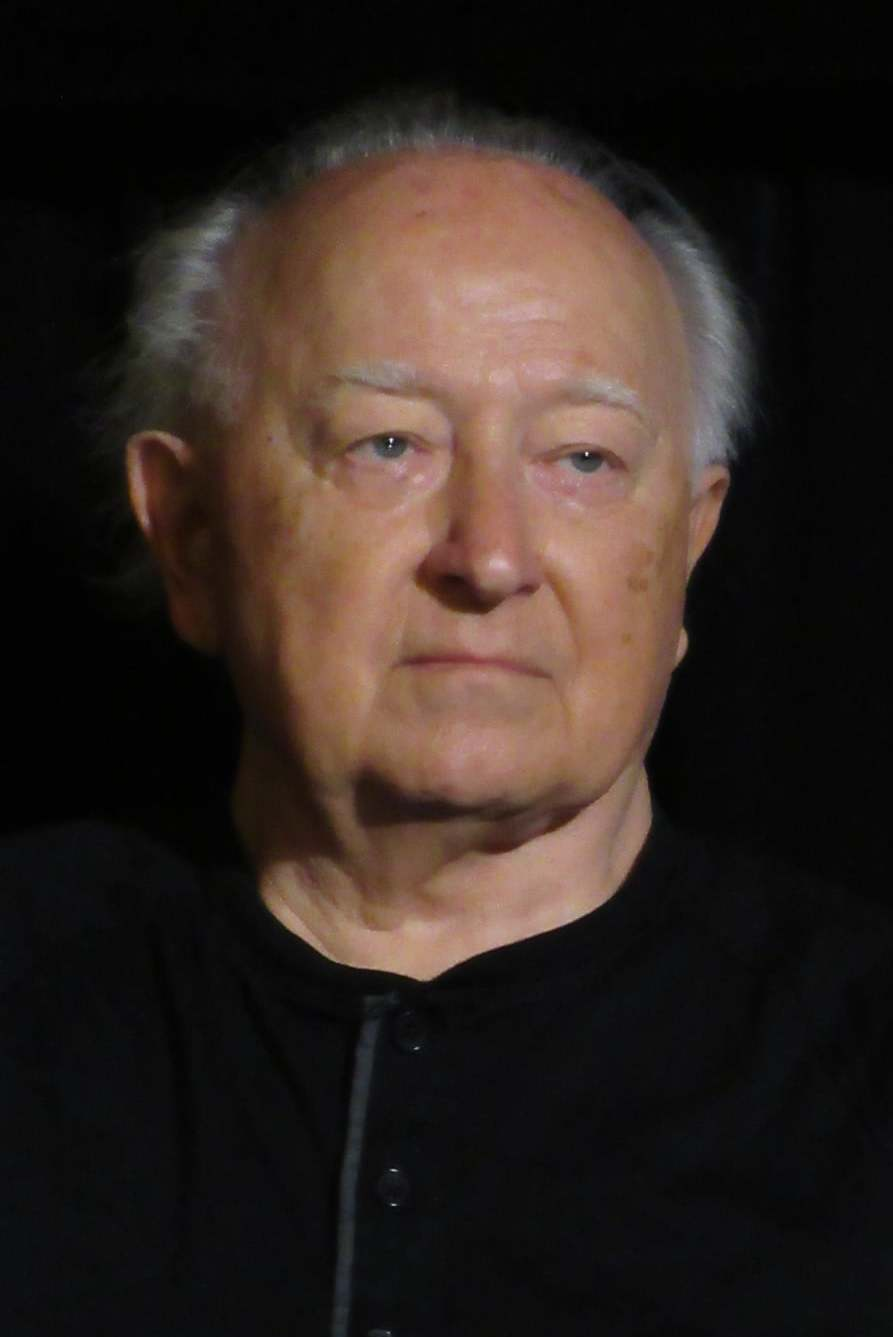
Tarnawsky in 2019

In 1996 Tarnawsky was resident artist at the international writers' colony Ledig House, in upstate New York, where most of the plays comprising 6x0 were written, and in 1998 at Mabou Mines, the avant-garde New York City theatre company, where his own English-language version of his play Not Medea was staged in an experimental, laboratory production. The same year his early play Four Designs for Ukrainian National Flag was staged at the Ternopil Drama Theater, in Ukraine. In 1997, the first four plays from 6x0—The Boring Bitch of Despair, Female Anatomy, Not Medea, and Dwarfs—received a public reading by actors of the drama studio of National University of the Kyiv-Mohyla Academy in Kyiv. Plays based on his poetry were likewise staged on numerous occasions by student theaters at the universities of Rivne and Ostroh, in Ukraine, during 1998–2004. The 1994 film Journey into Dusk by the Ukrainian-American filmmaker Yuri Myskiw is based mostly on his poetry. The title of the 2016 film by Olexandr Fraze-Frazenko about the New York Group An Aquarium in the Sea, in which Tarnawsky is given a prominent role, is taken from his widely reprinted article dealing with the group. Fraze-Frazenko's documentary 2019 film Casi Desnudo is exclusively about him. Tarnawsky is also the author of the libretto of the opera Not Medea, based on his eponymous play, by the Ukrainian-American composer Virko Baley, part of which was staged in New York City in 2012.

For his contribution to Ukrainian literature Tarnawsky was awarded the Prince Yaroslav the Wise Order of Merit by Ukrainian government in 2008. In March 2019 he was inducted into New Jersey Institute of Technology's NCE 100 Hall of Fame.

His works have been translated into numerous languages, including French, German, Italian, Polish, Portuguese, and Spanish; selected poems in Russian are published in 2024 in Latvia in Dmitry Kuzmin's translation. Tarnawsky's poetry and prose have been the subject of numerous articles and reviews as well as MA and Candidate of Sciences dissertations in Ukraine and Poland, and a PhD dissertation in Italy. Four of them have been published as monographs.

=== Cinematography ===
- Journey into Dusk (укр. Подорож у сутінки, 1994, directed by Yuriy Myskiv) - artistic film / video editing based on the poetry of five members of The New York Group.
- An Aquarium in the Sea. The Story of New York Group (укр. Акваріум в морі. Історія Нью-йоркської групи,2016, directed by Alexander Fraze-Frazenko) - a documentary.
- Casi Desnudo (2019, directed by Oleksandr Fraze-Frazenko) - a full-length documentary about Tarnawsky.

=== Personal life and death ===
Tarnawsky was married three times:

- Patricia Nell Warren (married 1957–1973)
- Alison Kmetyk (married 1979–1993). From Alison Kmetyk has a daughter, Ustya Tarnawsky
- Karina Zalewska (married in 2000)

Of Polish origin, Zalewska received an MA degree in Ukrainian philology from the Krakow Jagiellonian University in 1999 and met her future husband in Kyiv in 1998, when she was on an exchange student program.

Tarnawsky died on October 14, 2025, at the age of 91.

== Selected bibliography ==
- Zhyttja v misti (Life in the City) (1956, poetry, Ukrainian)
- Popoludni v Pokipsi (Afternoons in Poughkeepsie) (1960, poetry, Ukrainian, New York Group Publishing)
- Shljaxy (Roads) (1961, novel, Ukrainian, Suchasnist Publishers)
- Idealizovana biohrafija (An Idealized Biography) (1964, poetry, Ukrainian, Suchasnist Publishers, Munich)
- Spomyny (Memories) (1964, poetry, Ukrainian, Suchasnist Publishers
- Bez Espaniji (Without Spain) (1969, poetry, Ukrainian, Suchasnist Publishers)
- Questionnaires (1970, poetry, Ukrainian)
- Poeziji pro nishcho i inshi poeziji na cju samu temu (Poems About Nothing and Other Poems on the Same Subject) (1970, poetry, Ukrainian, New York Group Publishing)
- This Is How I Get Well (Oto jak zdrowjeje) (1978, poetry, English and later Ukrainian, Suchasnist Publishers)
- Meningitis (1978, novel, English, Fiction Collective)
- Bez nichoho (Without Anything) (1991, poetry, Ukrainian, Dnipro Publishers)
- U ra na (1992, book-length poem, Ukrainian, Berezil Publishers & M. P. Kots Publishers)
- Three Blondes and Death (1993, novel, English, FC2)
- 6x0 (1998, collected plays, Ukrainian, Rodovid)
- An Ideal Woman (1999, poetry, Ukrainian)
- The City of Sticks and Pits (1999, book-length poem, Ukrainian)
- Jix nemaje (They Don't Exist) (1999, collected poetry 1970–1999, Ukrainian, Rodovid)
- Ne znaju (I Don't Know) (2000, selected fiction, Ukrainian, Rodovid)
- Korotki xvosty (Short Tails) (2006, short stories, Ukrainian, Dmitri Burago Publishing)
- Like Blood in Water (2007, collection of mininovels, English, FC2)
- Short Tails (2011, short stories, English, Journal of Experimental Fiction Books)
- Kvity xvoromu ( Flowers for the Patient) (2012, selected essays and interviews, Ukrainian, Piramida)
- Modus Tollens ( 2013, poems, English, Jaded Ibis Press,
- The Placebo Effect Trilogy consisting of Like Blood in Water, The Future of Giraffes and View of Delft (2013, collections of mininovels, English, JEF Books)
- Crocodile Smiles short shrift fictions (2014, short stories, English, Black Scat Books)
- Claim to Oblivion selected essays and interviews (2016, English, JEF Books)
- Znannjeva semantyka (Translation of the 1982 NYU Linguistics PhD dissertation Knowledge Semantics) (2016, Ukrainian, National University of the Kyiv-Mohyla Academy)
- Literary Yoga exercises for those who can write (2018, English, JEF Books)
- Warm Arctic Nights (2019, novel, English, JEF Books)
- The Iguanas of Heat (2019, novel, English, JEF Books)
- Tepli poljarni nochi (Warm Polar Nights, translation of Warm Arctic Nights) (2019, novel, Ukrainian, Tempora)
- Crocodile Smiles short shrift fictions (2020, short stories, expanded edition, English, JEF Books)
- Warme arktische Nächte (Warm Arctic Nights, translation of Warm Arctic Nights) (2020, novel, German, Edition Noëma/ibidem-Verlag)
- La vita in città (Life in the City, selected poetry, translation) (2021, Italian, Elliot Edizioni)
