= Roman Babowal =

Ukrainian and French poet and translator (1950–2005)

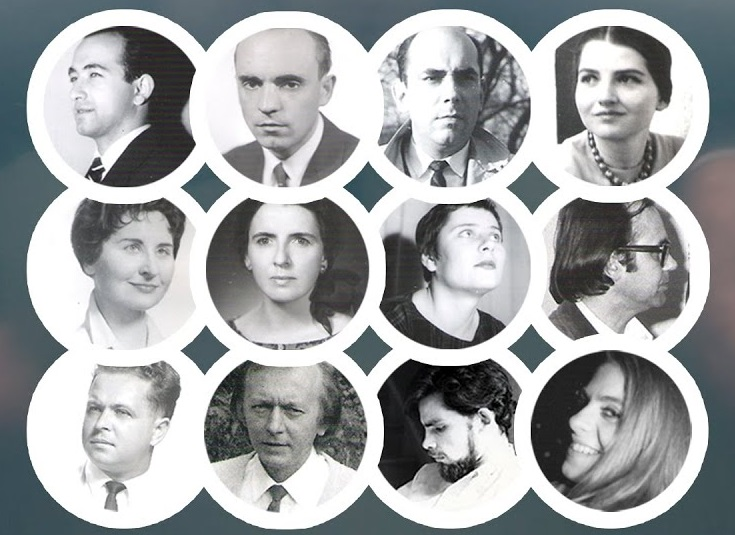
New York Group, Babowal is third row, second from the left

Roman Babowal (September 2, 1950, Liege - June 15, 2005, Liege) was a Ukrainian and French poet and translator from Belgium. He was a member of the New York Group. He wrote his works in Ukrainian and French.
