= Vira Vovk =

Ukrainian-born Brazilian writer (1926–2022)

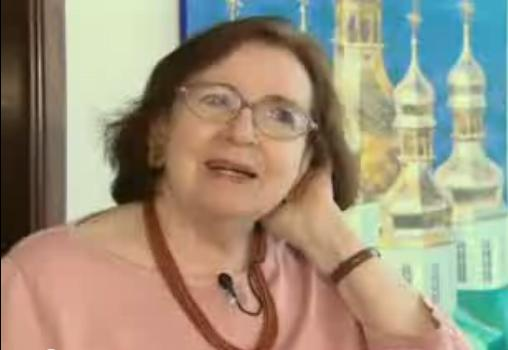
- Born: Vira Ostapivna Selianska; 2 January 1926; Boryslav, Ukraine
- Died: 16 July 2022 (aged 96); Rio de Janeiro, Brazil
- Education: University of Tübingen; Columbia University; Ludwig-Maximilians-Universität München
- Occupations: Writer, critic, translator, professor
- Writing career
- Pen name: Vira Vovk
- Language: Ukrainian, German, Portuguese
- Genres: Poetry, novels, plays
- Notable awards: Ivan Franko Literary Award (1957, 1979, 1982, 1990); Blahovist Award (2000); Shevchenko National Prize (2008)

Vira Ostapivna Selianska (Ukrainian: Ві́ра Оста́півна Селя́нська, pen name Vira Vovk (Ukrainian: Ві́ра Вовк; 2 January 1926 – 16 July 2022) was a Ukrainian writer, critic and translator. She wrote in Ukrainian, German and Portuguese.

== Biography ==
Born in Boryslav in 1926, she grew up in the Hutsul region in the town of Kuty (at that time on the Polish-Romanian border). Vira Vovk's secondary education was completed in Lviv and Dresden. She studied Germanics, music history and comparative literature at the University of Tübingen. In 1945, she emigrated with her mother to Portugal and in 1949, further to Brazil. She went to Rio de Janeiro where she completed her university studies. Post graduate studies were completed at Columbia University (New York City) and the Ludwig-Maximilians-Universität München.

Vovk received a PhD and became professor of German literature at the Federal University of Rio de Janeiro. Vovk has created ten collections of poetry, ten novels, and eleven plays and has made numerous translations of Western writers into Ukrainian and Ukrainian writers into Portuguese.

Vovk died on 16 July 2022 in Rio de Janeiro, Brazil at the age 96.

== Awards and achievements ==
She received the Ivan Franko Literary award in 1957, 1979, 1982 and 1990, the Blahovist award 2000. She actively propagated Ukrainian culture and language. In 2008, Vovk received Ukrainian state award Shevchenko National Prize.

== Sources ==
- Danylo Husar Struk, Vira Vovk at Internet Encyclopedia of Ukraine
- Viktoriia Kostiuchenko, Віра Вовк: Читачі в Бразилії і Португалії мають одне джерело, то є мої видання (Vera Wolf: Readers in Brazil and Portugal have one source, that is my publications), Ukraina Moloda Newspaper, April 2008, in Ukrainian.
- Літературні вечори в Українському Інституті Модерного Мистецтва Чикаго, 1973–2006 // Укладачі: Віра Боднарук, Володимир Білецький. — Донецьк: Український культурологічний центр, 2006. — 140 с.
- Virtual library of Ukrainian poetry by the New York group.
- Liudmyla Taran, Українка з Бразилії (A Ukrainian from Brazil), Den, 13.06.2001
- Vira Vovk, Карнавал. Оповідання до картин Юрія Соловія (Carnival. Narratives to paintings of Yurii Solovii). Rio de Janeiro, 1986.
