= Literature and Medicine =

- Discipline: Literature, Medicine
- Language: English
- Edited by: Michael Blackie

Publication details
- History: 1982-present
- Publisher: Johns Hopkins University Press (United States)
- Frequency: Biannually

Standard abbreviations
- ISO 4: Lit. Med.

Indexing
- ISSN: 0278-9671 (print); 1080-6571 (web)
- OCLC no.: 31871349

Links
- Journal homepage; Online access

Literature and Medicine is an academic journal founded in 1982. It is devoted to researching and understanding the interfaces between literary and medical knowledge. Literary and cultural texts are used to examine concerns related to illness, trauma, the body, and other medical issues. Articles are provided by experts in a variety of fields in both medicine and the humanities and social sciences. There are two issues each year, one general, one thematic.

The journal is published biannually in May and November by the Johns Hopkins University Press. Circulation is 497 and the average length of an issue is 164 pages.

== See also ==
- Medical humanities
