= Elmwood Cemetery (River Grove, Illinois) =

Elmwood Cemetery and Mausoleum
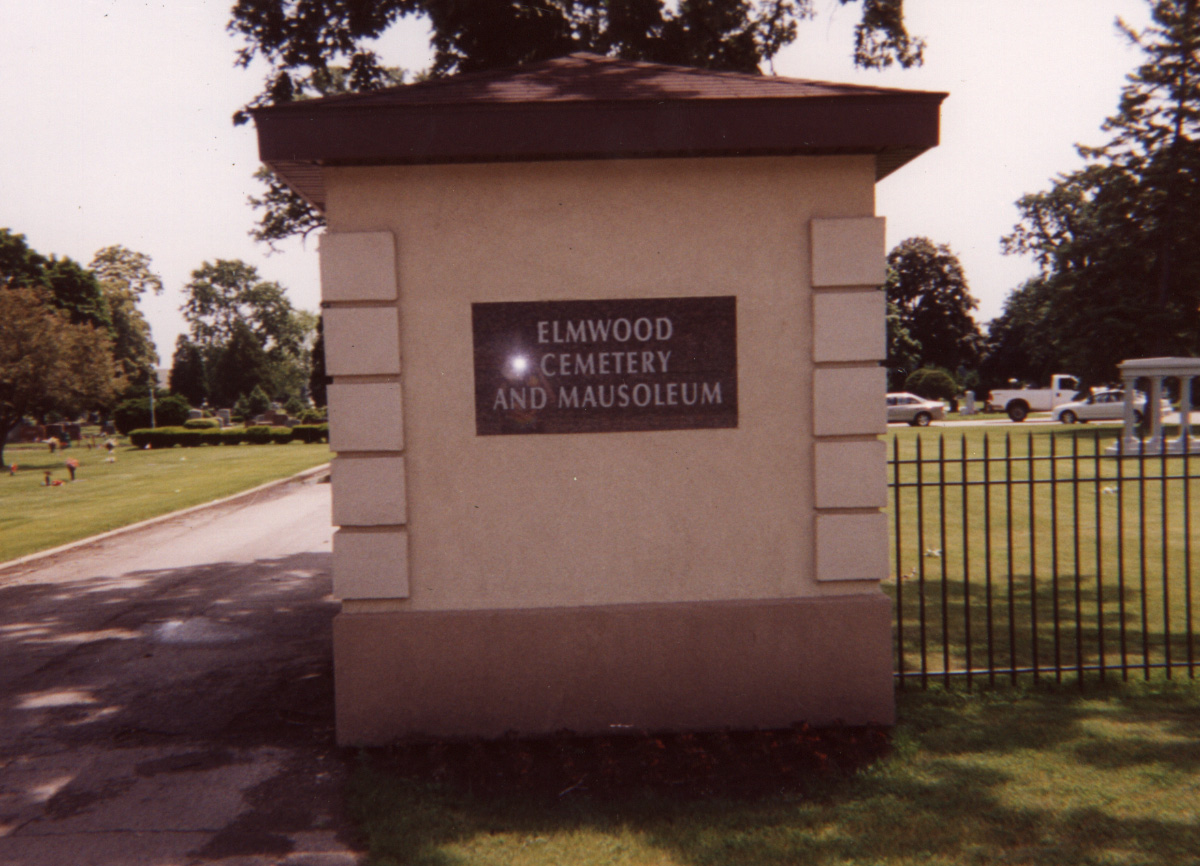
- The front gates of Elmwood Cemetery
- Interactive map of Elmwood Cemetery and Mausoleum

Details
- Location: River Grove, Illinois
- Country: United States
- Coordinates: 41.932°N 87.830°W
- Find a Grave: Elmwood Cemetery and Mausoleum

Elmwood Cemetery and Mausoleum is located at 2905 Thatcher Avenue, in River Grove, Illinois, United States. It features a cenotaph of comedian John Belushi, although his body is buried somewhere else. However, his mother, Agnes Belushi, is buried in the same location.

== Notable burials ==
- Johann Otto Hoch – (1862–1906)
- John Siomos – (1947–2004)
- Ron Sobie – (1934–2009)
- Jazep Varonka – (1891–1952)
- Victims of the Iroquois Theatre Fire (1903)
- Victims of the Eastland Disaster (1915)

== War memorials ==
The cemetery is home to numerous war memorials.

- The memorial to U.S. Grant Post 28 of the Grand Army of the Republic, whose members included Union Gen. John A. Logan, is a tall column shaft with five soldier statues.
- Nearby, Washington Post 573 of the G.A.R. erected a memorial; it is surrounded by the graves of some of its members.
- A memorial by the Woman's Relief Corps was erected in 1904 honor of Union soldiers' widows.
- The Chicago Typographical Union erected a memorial in honor of 15 of its members who died in World War I.
- Memorials are also erected to Hellenic American veterans and Assyrian American veterans.
