= Jurij Solovij =

Ukrainian painter, essayist (1921–2007)

- Юрій Соловій
- Born: 6 January 1921; Staryi Sambir (now Lviv Oblast, Ukraine)
- Died: 23 April 2007 (aged 86); Rutherford, New Jersey, U.S.
- Education: Lviv Industrial School
- Occupations: Painter, essayist

Jurij Solovij (Ukrainian: Юрій Соловій, romanized: Yurii Solovii; 6 January 1921 – 23 April 2007) was a Ukrainian-American painter, essayist and a member of The New York Group of Poets.

== Biography ==
Jurij Solovij was born on 6 January 1921 in Staryi Sambir (now Lviv Oblast, Ukraine).

He graduated from the art and industrial school in Lviv (1944). Later he lived in Germany and Rutherford, New Jersey in the United States.

He has participated in more than 20 exhibitions, including collective shows of Ukrainian artists in Munich (1947, Bavarian National Museum; 1971, Galerie Günther Franke), exhibitions at the Nuremberg Museum (1950), as well as vernissages at the Universities of Chicago (1960) and New York (1972) and galleries in Toronto and New York City.

Solovij began his career under the influence of neocubism, and in the 1950s and 1960s his works were marked by the features of the New York Expressionist school. His works often feature religious motifs. Solovij also actively experimented with unconventional materials in sculpture and painting, using plastic and feathers.

He exhibited his paintings in Munich (Germany), Trenton, Chicago, and Toronto (Canada). He experimented with the material and developed Christian themes. In 2007, during the opening of the Mystetskyi Arsenal in Kyiv, 42 paintings and graphic works by Jurij Solovij were presented.

He died on 23 April 2007 in Rutherford, New Jersey.

== Literary creativity ==
Publications, essays:

- Pro rechi bilshi nizh zori: zbirka statei (1978)
- Bahato tem // Suchasnist. 1962. Part 7.
- Vidvidyny "Na hori" // Suchasnist. 1962. Part 12. P. 71-97.

== Painting creativity ==
Author of paintings in miniature and serial forms, including:

- "Materynstvo" (1947)
- "Astralne" (1948)
- "Rozpiattia" (1950, 1969)
- Cycles "Materynstvo", "Buttia", "Smert"
- Series "1000 holiv" (1971)

Individual works are preserved in the collections of the Canadian-Ukrainian Art Foundation in Toronto (Canada), the Ukrainian Institute of Modern Art in Chicago (USA), and others.

== Bibliography ==
- Soloviy Yuriy // Encyclopedia of Ukrainian Studies: Dictionary : in 11 vols. / Shevchenko Scientific Society ; editor-in-chief Prof., Dr. Volodymyr Kubiyovych. — Paris — New York : Young Life, 1976. — Book 2, [vol. 8] : Symbolism — Technical Plants. — ISBN 5-7707-4049-3.
- Boychuk B. Yuriy Solovy Neoexpressionism, New York Group // Svit-Vid, 1996, Ch. II(23), P. 88.
- Boychuk B. Yuriy Solovy // Memories in Biography, K.: Fakt, 2003, P. 115–118.
- Zenovy L. Feshchak. Yuriy Solovy's Exhibition in Philadelphia // Modernity, 1976, Ch. 4 (184), P.98—100.
- Zhodani I. M. Vera Vovk's interpretation of Yuriy Solovy's painting images (drama "Triptych" and collection "Carnival") // Emma Andievska and Vera Vovk: texts in the context of intersemiotics, K.: VDK University "Ukraine", 2007, P. 79-84.
- Ukrainian diaspora: literary figures, works, biobibliographic information / Compiled by V.A. Prosalova, Donetsk: Skhidnyi vydavnichy dim, 2012, P. 516
- Davydova K. Reinterpretation of the canonical image of St. Sebastian in the work of Yuriy Solovy // Bulletin of the Lviv National Academy of Arts, 2022, Issue No. 48, P. 11—17.
- Davydova K. The German period of Yuriy Solovy's work (1944–1952): The influence of the socio-cultural environment // Current issues of the Humanities: Interuniversity collection of scientific works of young scientists of the Ivan Franko Drohobych State Pedagogical University / editors-compilers M. Pantyuk, A. Dushny, V. Ilnytskyi, I. Zymomrya, Drohobych: Publishing house "Helvetica", 2024, Issue 77. Volume 1, P. 151—156.
- Davydova K. Theoretical Heritage of Yuriy Solovy as an important aspect of Ukrainian art criticism of the 20th century // Hagenmeister readings: Abstracts of reports of the IV International Scientific Practical Conference, Kamianets-Podilskyi, December 5-6, 2024: Ukrainian culture and art during wartime: destruction of hierarchies / edited by S. Luts; Kamianets-Podilskyi National University named after Ivan Ohienko. Kamianets-Podilskyi: FOP Pankova A. S., 2025, P. 181—183, ISBN 978-617-7773-78-7.
