= Slava Gerulak =

Ukrainian-American ceramic artist

- Born: Yaroslava Gerulak; May 5, 1933 (age 93); Stopnica, Poland

Slava Gerulak (born May 5, 1933) is a Ukrainian-American ceramic artist known for her sculpture based in New York. In the mid-1950's she was part of the New York Group [Нью-Йоркська Група; Niu-Iorkska hrupa], a group of poets and artists, which developed spontaneously from friendships and discussions around the Students’ke slovo (Student Word) supplement to the Ukrainian American newspaper Svoboda.

== Biography ==
Gerulak was born in the town of Stopnica in southern Poland. She immigrated to the United States in 1950 from the DP Camp in Mittenwald, Germany. She studied at the School of the Art Institute of Chicago, and earned a BA from Sienna Heights College (1954) and an MA from Northwestern University (1959). From 1959 to 1962 she lived in Paris, settling in New York City afterwards. She taught at Manhattan College in Purchase NY from 1955 to 1957.

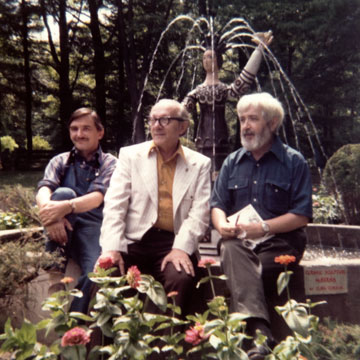
Ukrainian Artists sitting in front of Slava Gerulak's Mayana Statue at Soyuzivka

== Exhibitions ==
Gerulak participated in many exhibits at The Ukrainian Museum, including Members Collect (2014) and The Ukrainian Diaspora: Women Artists, 1908–2015 (2015) and The Ceramic World of Slava Gerulak 2021–23. The artist participated in many exhibitions as a member of the Association of Ukrainian Artists in America in addition to group shows in Paris, Toronto, Philadelphia, Chicago, New York, Ohio, and elsewhere. Her work is found in many public and private collections nationally and internationally.

== Style and technique ==
Gerulak worked primarily in clay creating works that could functional or purely decorative. She was most often inspired by her heritage and it's folklore adapting images of mermaids, nymphs, protectresses, a mother and child, villagers in folk costumes, and girls with head adornments/floral wreaths to create her own style of figurative ceramics which explores Ukrainian life.
