= Central Presbyterian Church (Little Rock, Arkansas) =

Historic church in Arkansas, United States

- U.S. National Register of Historic Places
- U.S. Historic district – Contributing property
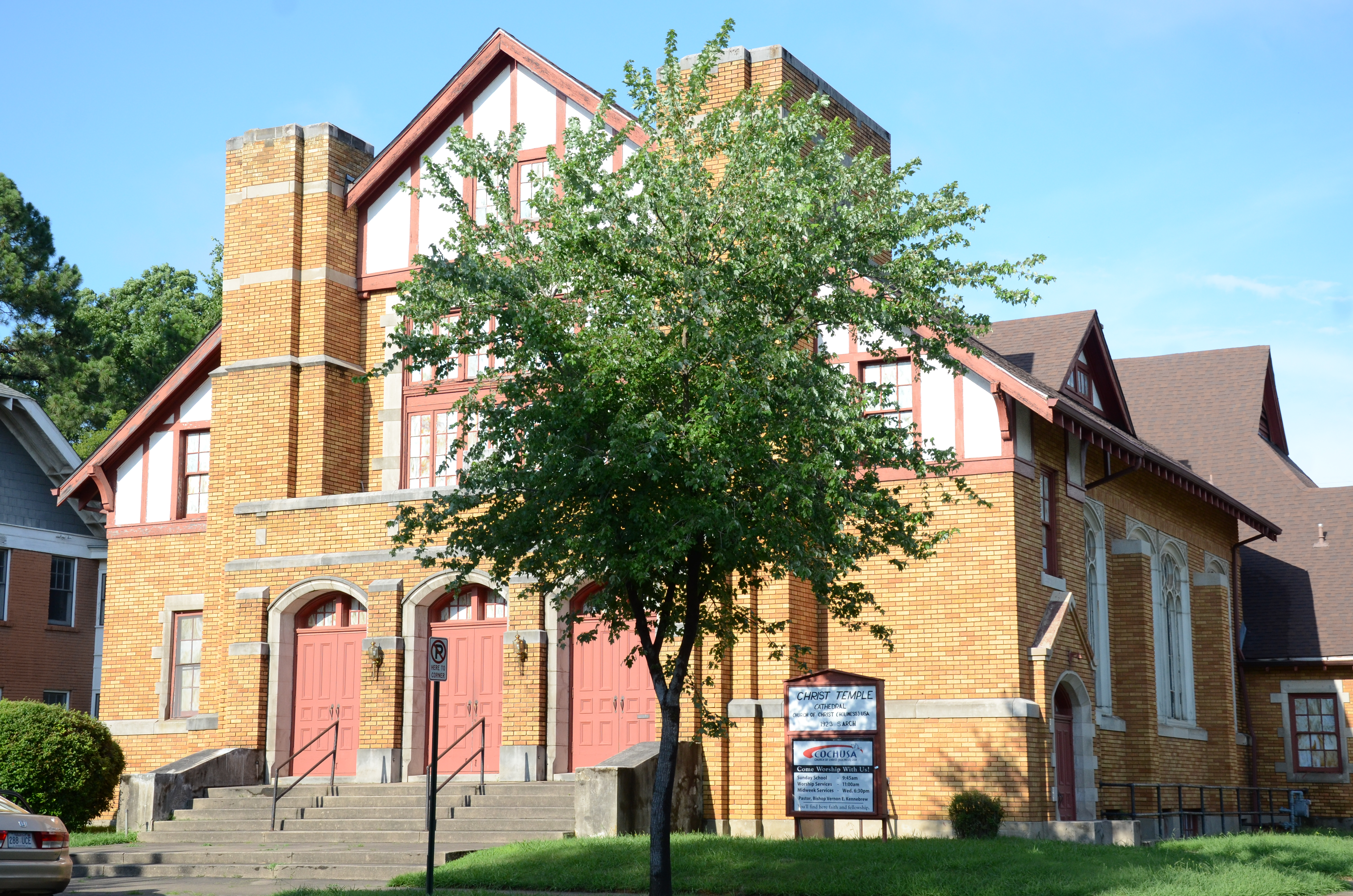

- Location within Arkansas Location within the United States
- Location: 1921 Arch St., Little Rock, Arkansas
- Coordinates: 34°43′47″N 92°16′45″W
- Area: less than one acre
- Built: 1921
- Architect: Thompson & Harding
- Architectural style: Late Gothic Revival, Bungalow/Craftsman
- Part of: Governor's Mansion Historic District (ID88000631)
- MPS: Thompson, Charles L., Design Collection TR
- NRHP reference No.: 82000881

Significant dates
- Added to NRHP: December 22, 1982
- Designated CP: May 19, 1988

The Central Presbyterian Church of Little Rock was located in the Quapaw Quarter area of Little Rock.

The original Central Presbyterian Church building is Christ Temple Cathedral, formerly the home of Central Presbyterian Church, is a historic church building at 1921 Arch Street in Little Rock, Arkansas. It was built in 1921 to a design by Thompson & Harding in Late Gothic Revival and Bungalow/Craftsman style. Its exterior is clad in yellow brick, with half-timbered stuccoed elements in its gable ends. Its main entrance consists of three segmented-arch openings, set in a projecting section between two brick piers with stone banding. The present church congregation using this building is affiliated with the United Church of Christ.

The church building was listed on the National Register of Historic Places in 1982.

in 2014 a church plant named Central Presbyterian Church (PCA) was started in the Hillcrest Neighborhood and was renamed Central Hope Church in 2019.

== See also ==
- National Register of Historic Places listings in Little Rock, Arkansas
- http://www.centralpreslr.com
