= Marian Library =

Catholic institutions in Dayton, Ohio

Coordinates: 39°44′25″N 84°10′44″W

The Marian Library and International Marian Research Institute are two Catholic institutions of higher learning at the University of Dayton. They were previously one entity, but in 2017 returned to being administered independently.

== Institutions ==
- The International Marian Research Institute is a center for research and scholarship on the Blessed Virgin Mary, maintains an online encyclopedia about Mary.
- The Marian Library is one of the world's largest repository of books, periodicals, artwork, and artifacts on Mary, the mother of Jesus Christ.

== History ==
The Marian Library was founded in 1943, and is home to an extensive collection of books, periodicals, artwork, manuscripts, films, and ephemera related to the Blessed Virgin Mary. The Marian Library is located within Roesch Library at the University of Dayton, and is home to the International Marian Research Institute (IMRI), an institute dedicated to Mariology, or the study of Mary. The Rev. Johann Roten, S.M., is an internationally recognized scholar and authority on Mary, the mother of Jesus Christ who headed the International Marian Research Institute/Marian Library at the University of Dayton for 15 years.

The International Marian Research Institute was founded in 1975 in affiliation with the Marianum, a Pontifical Institute in Rome, allowing students to study in United States, instead of having to travel to Rome to complete their studies. IMRI's programs included a doctorate in sacred theology (S.T.D.) and licentiate in sacred theology (S.T.L.). IMRI stopped admitting new students to this program in 2016 and has closed the pontifical degree programs with the final commencement in August 2021. Students, however, can continue to earn credits towards a master's degree through the Department of Religious Studies of the University of Dayton.

IMRI is also continuing to produce its Marian Forums, publishing the scholarly journal Marian Library Studies. In 2021, IMRI ceased hosting Marian Studies and Spirituality, a weekly radio program on Radio Maria.
