= Central Presbyterian Church (Montclair, New Jersey) =

Historic church in New Jersey, United States

- U.S. National Register of Historic Places
- New Jersey Register of Historic Places
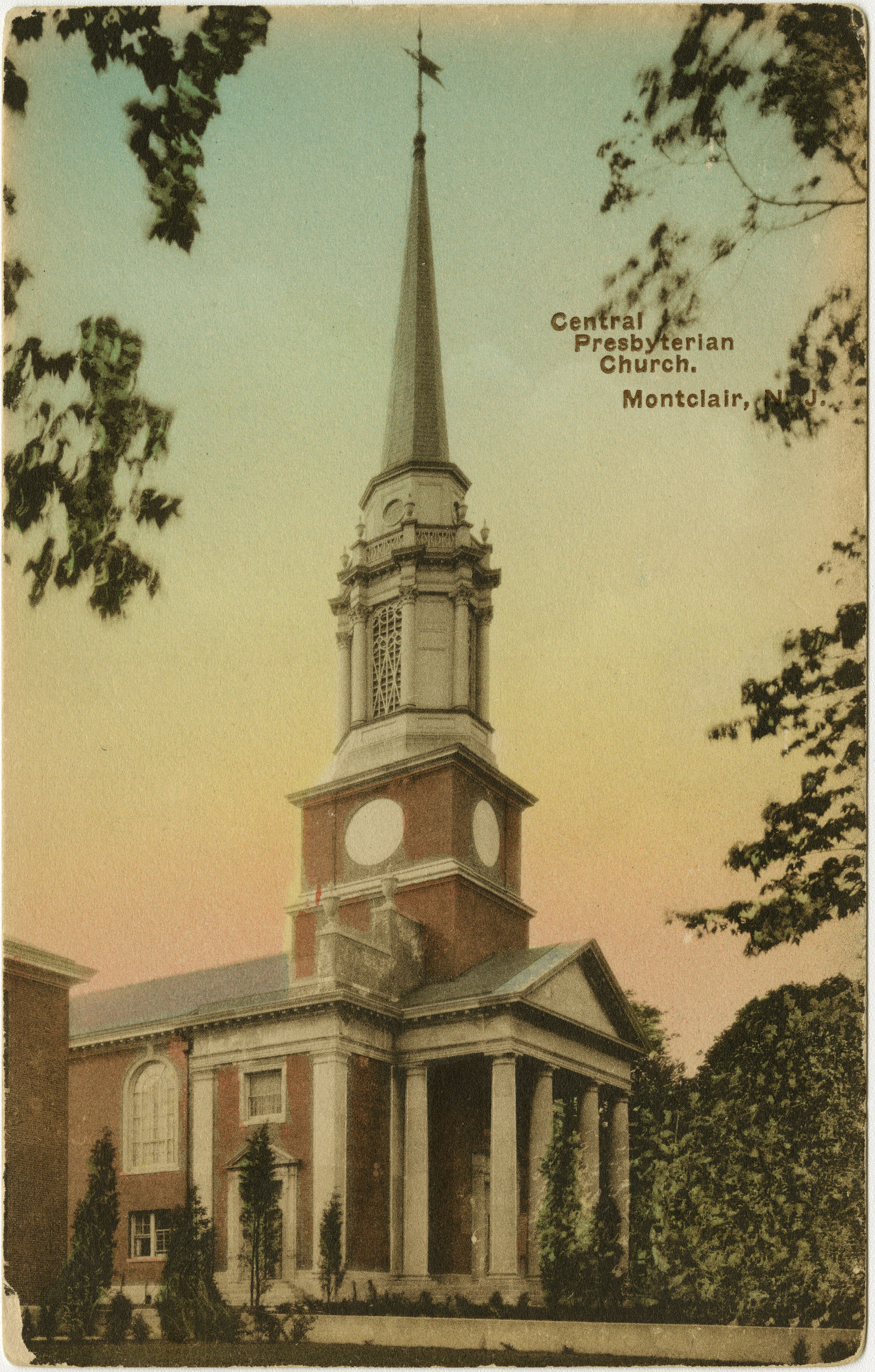
- Central Presbyterian Church on a vintage postcard

- Location within Essex County, New Jersey Location within New Jersey Location within the United States
- Location: 46 Park Street, Montclair, New Jersey
- Coordinates: 40°49′4″N 74°13′4″W
- Built: 1921
- Architect: Carrere & Hastings; Shreve, Lamb & Harmon
- Architectural style: Colonial Revival, Georgian Revival
- MPS: Montclair MRA
- NRHP reference No.: 86003051
- NJRHP No.: 1110

Significant dates
- Added to NRHP: November 14, 1986
- Designated NJRHP: September 28, 1986

Central Presbyterian Church is a historic church located at 46 Park Street in Montclair, New Jersey, United States.

The church was built in 1921 and dedicated on Oct. 15, 1922. It was added to the National Register of Historic Places on November 14, 1986, for its significance in architecture. The building was designed by architecture firms Carrere & Hastings and Shreve, Lamb & Harmon.

== History ==
In 1837 a board of trustees and officers, elected at a meeting at the local schoolhouse, started planning for a Presbyterian society for West Bloomfield, the township informally known as Cranetown that later, in 1870, was officially recognized as Montclair.

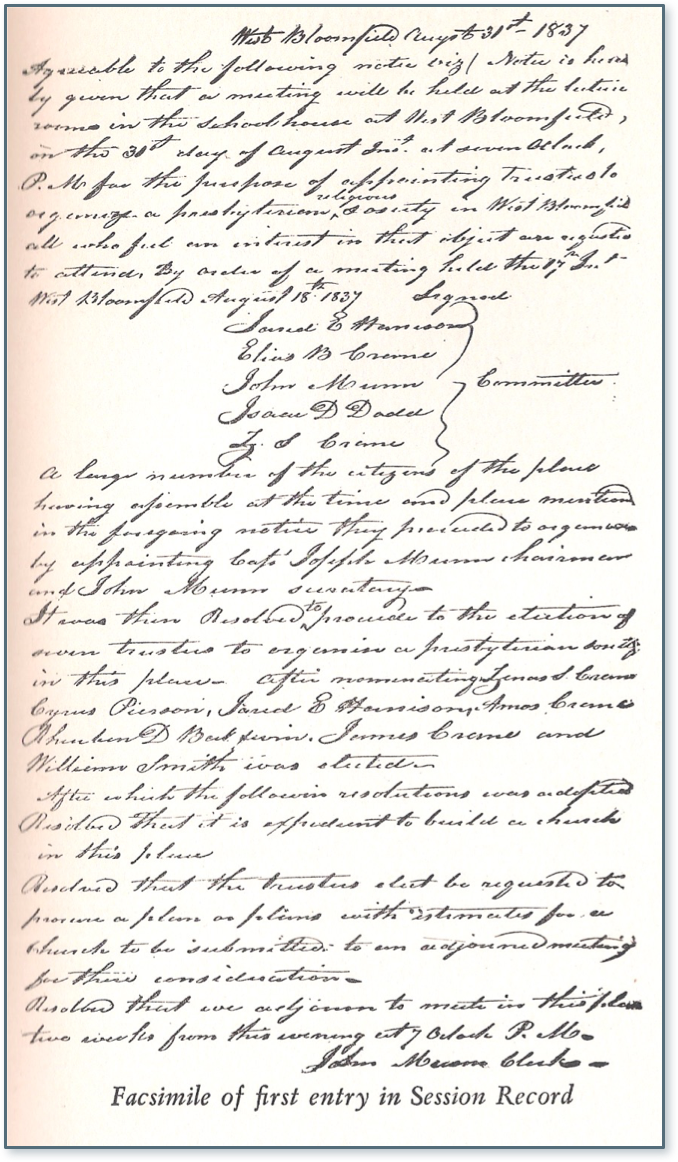
1837 session notes

The schoolhouse already on the property was renovated. The church was made of wood and built over the schoolrooms. The church was in the center of town, on a triangular-shaped block bordered by Bloomfield Avenue, Park Street and Church Street. On August 9, 1838 the church was formally dedicated. Samuel Ware Fischer was the church's first pastor, from 1839 to 1843 and later served as President of Hamilton College.

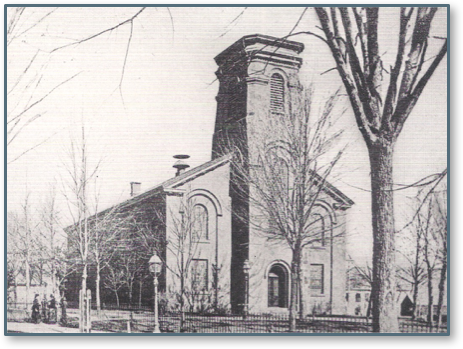
Central Presbyterian Church, 1856

In 1860 a new and larger building behind the original church was dedicated as The First Presbyterian Church of Montclair.

In 1867 the church bought the school next door and expanded to accommodate 700 people. In 1868, the new Township of Montclair's first board meeting was held in the church's lecture room.

In 1886, a split in the congregation concerning church policy led to the formation of the Trinity Presbyterian Church. On December 2, 1913, Trinity and Old First merged and officially became The Central Presbyterian Church of Montclair.

A new church building, at the corner of Park Street and Claremont Avenue, was dedicated on October 15, 1922.

== See also ==
- National Register of Historic Places listings in Essex County, New Jersey
- Central Presbyterian Church of Montclair, NJ
