= Central Presbyterian Church (Atlanta) =

Historic church in Georgia, United States

- U.S. National Register of Historic Places
- Atlanta Landmark Building
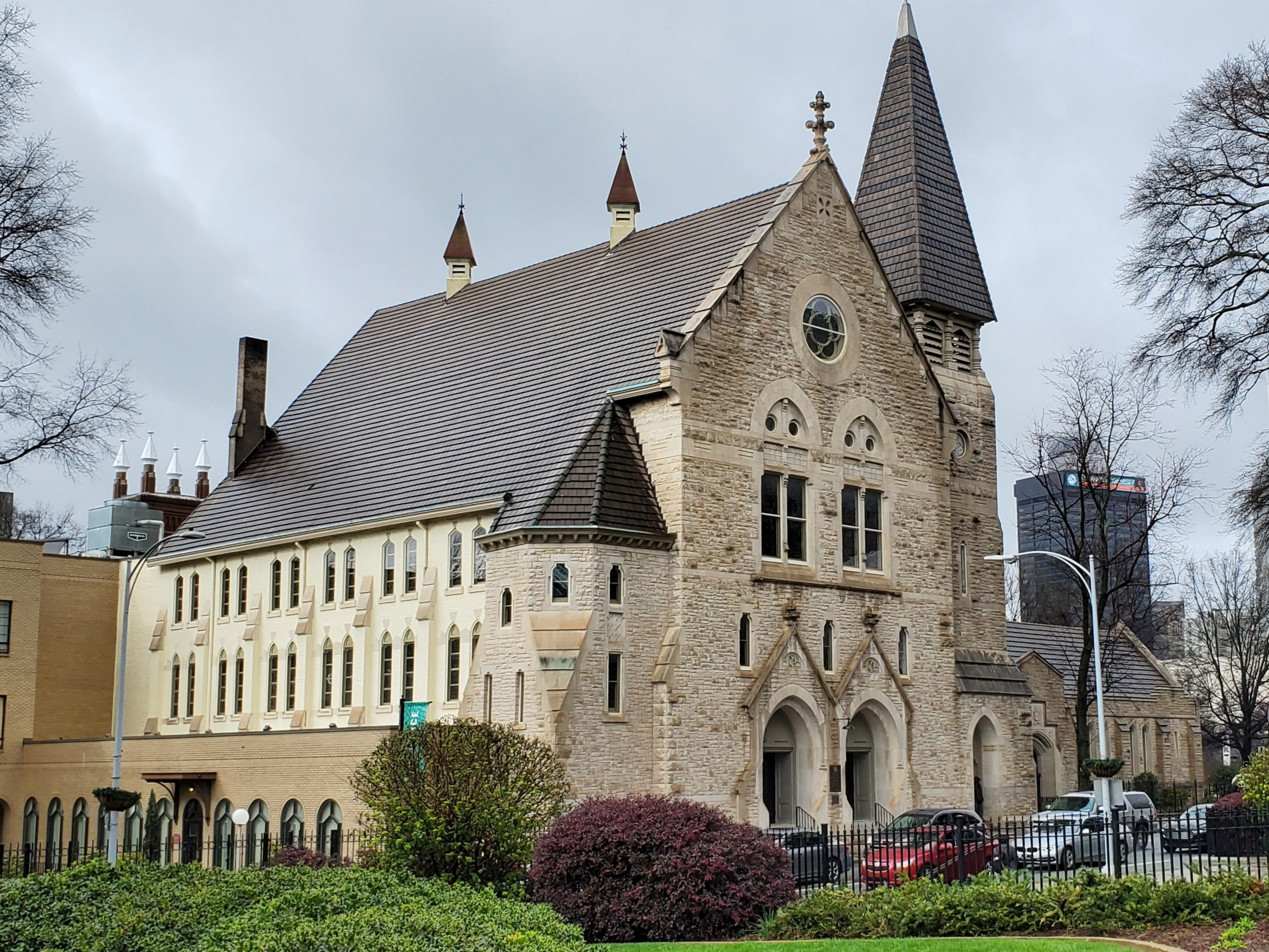
- Central Presbyterian Church (2020)

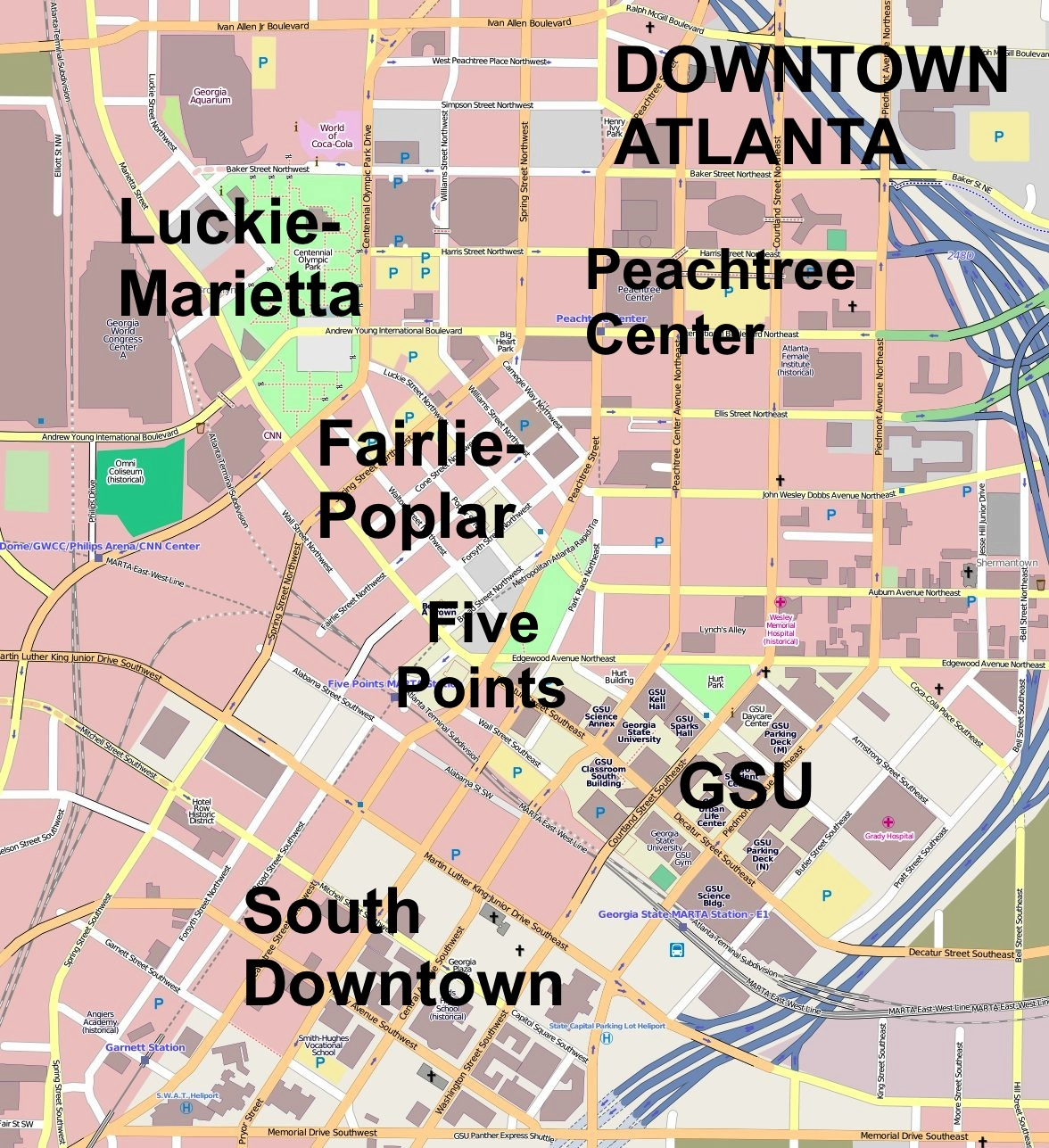
- Location within Downtown Atlanta Location within Atlanta Location within Georgia Location within the United States
- Location: 201 Washington St. SW, Atlanta, Georgia
- Coordinates: 33°44′59″N 84°23′21″W
- Area: 1 acre (0.40 ha)
- Built: 1885
- Architect: Lind, Edmund G.; Dougherty & Gardner
- Architectural style: Gothic, English Gothic
- NRHP reference No.: 86000366

Significant dates
- Added to NRHP: March 13, 1986
- Designated ALB: October 23, 1989

Central Presbyterian Church is a historic church at 201 Washington Street SW in Atlanta, Georgia. It was founded in 1858 and was added to the National Register of Historic Places in 1884.

Its tumultuous history includes its difficult separation from the First Presbyterian Church of Atlanta in 1858, occupation by Union forces in 1864, and trials of church members for offenses such as allowing dancing at a teenager's Christmas party during the 1880s.

Following this “reign of terror” against “errant members" and then a period of healing, the church began to emphasize social justice. During the 1930s, it became known as "the church that stayed" as other churches abandoned central Atlanta for the suburbs. Following the 1968 assassination of Martin Luther King Jr., the church focused on building bridges between white institutions and the African-American community.

== Gallery ==
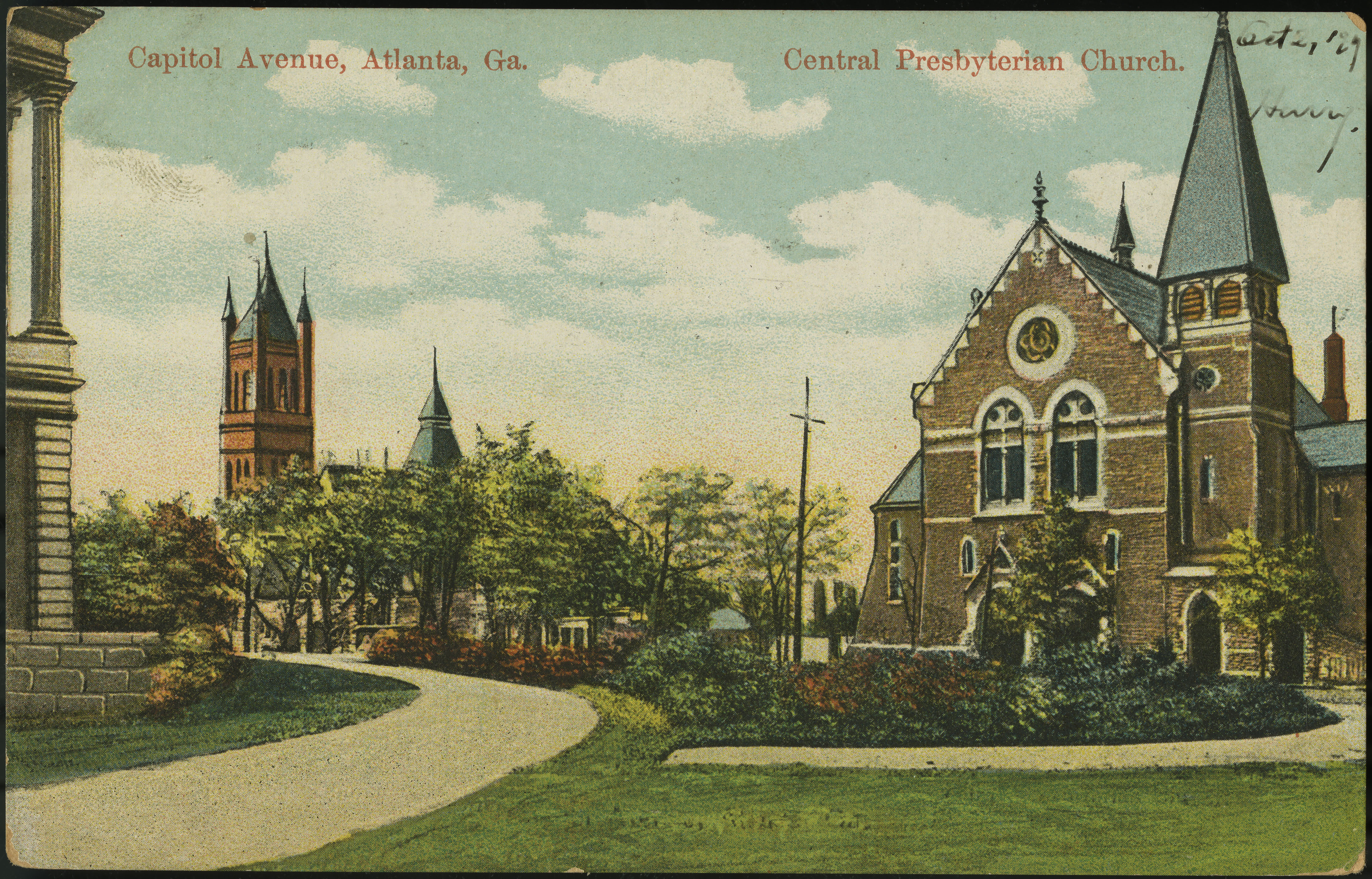
Central on a vintage postcard

== Links ==
https://cpcatlanta.org/ - Official site
