= Ukrainian Institute of Modern Art =

Museum in Chicago, Illinois

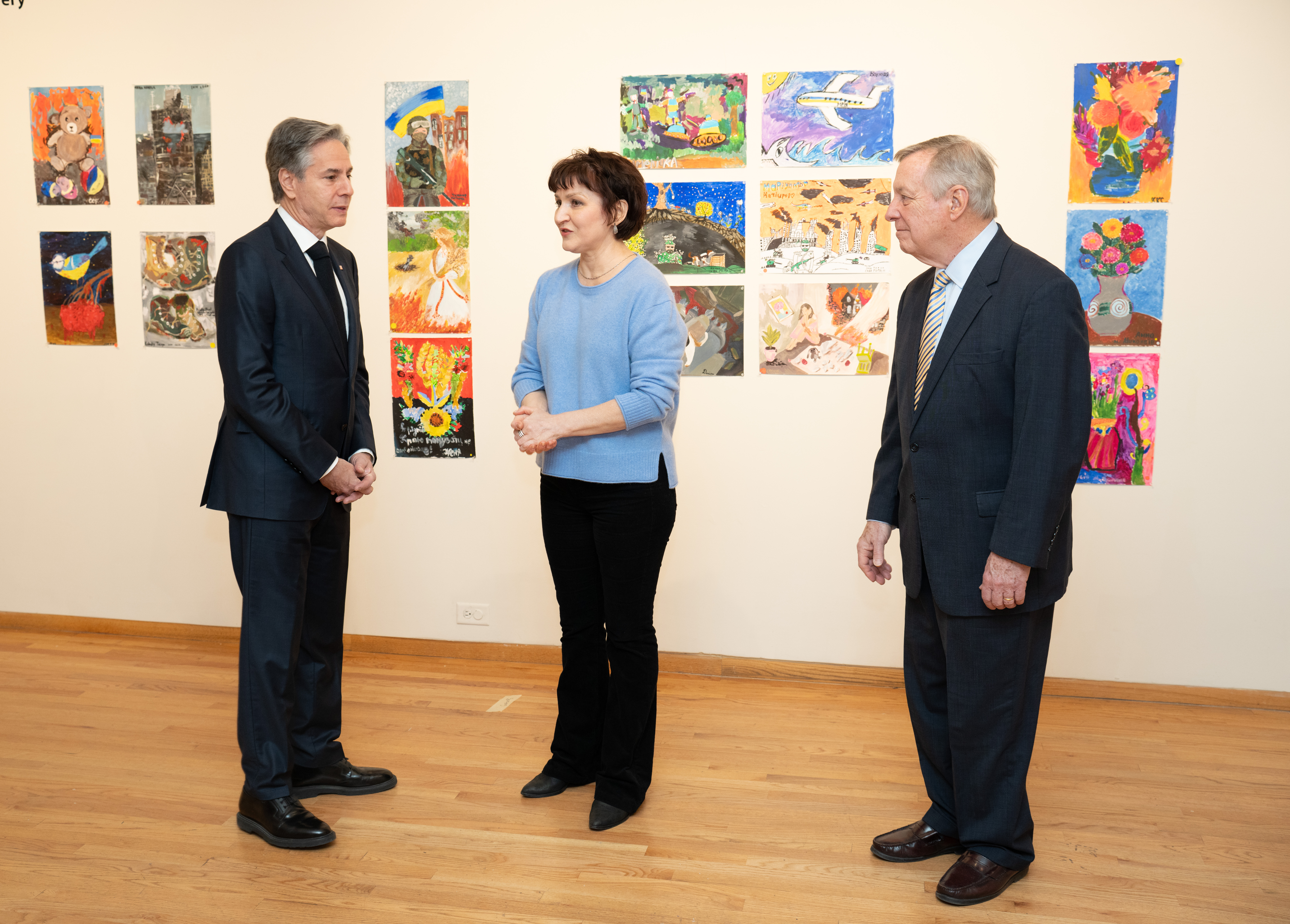
- Antony Blinken and Richard Durbin Visit the Ukrainian Institute of Modern Art (2023)
- Established: 1971
- Location: 2320 W Chicago Avenue; Chicago, Illinois
- Coordinates: 41.8960°N 87.6851°W
- Type: Art
- Website: uima-chicago.org

The Ukrainian Institute of Modern Art (UIMA) (Ukrainian: Український Інститут Модерного Мистецтва, romanized: Ukrayinskyi Instytut Modernoho Mystetstva) is a modern art museum serving the Chicago area with an ongoing program of cultural exhibitions, literary events, film screenings, and music recitals. UIMA was founded in 1971 by Dr. Achilles Chreptowsky, Vera Chereptowsky, Konstantin Milonadis and Mychajlo Urban in the heart of Chicago's Ukrainian Village, Chicago. It is a core member of the Chicago Cultural Alliance, a consortium of 25 ethnic museums and cultural centers in Chicago.

Six to seven major exhibits are held in the main gallery which occupies 2,100 square feet (200 m^{2}). Two side galleries house the permanent collection which includes the work of Chicago artists as well as that of sculptors and painters of Ukrainian descent.

UIMA runs a program of exhibitions, concerts, lectures, and multidisciplinary events. The immediate neighborhood is home to an ethnically diverse population and offers a wide variety of cultural events. UIMA is a not-for-profit organization. The Institute maintains one of the largest collections of Ukrainian-American abstract and minimalist works dating from the 1950’s, 1960s, and 1970s. Their permanent collection also includes the works of many renowned artists, including Alexander Archipenko, Alexis Gritchenko, Mychajlo Andreenko, Jerzy Nowosielski, Emma Andiewska, Patrick Caulfield, Jacques Hnizdovsky Jules Olitski, Patrick Caulfield, Elisabeth Frink, Mary Fedden, Robyn Denny, Richard Hunt, Thomas Kapsalis, Michiko Itatani, Aka Pereyma, Slava Gerulak, Arcadia Olenska-Petryshyn, Christina Saj, William Kurelek, Yevgeniy Prokopov, Volodymyr Makarenko, Vadym Meller, Jurij Solovij and many others.

In 2010 the museum hosted a career retrospective of the art of Gladys Nilsson, noted member of the "Hairy Who" art group.

An interactive exhibition Protest Art Call for Participation was mounted in 2022 with the start of the Russian Invasion of Ukraine, inviting the public to share its responses to the war in Ukraine through drawings, writings and poetry. The show was accompanied by protest-themed works from the permanent collection by Ukrainians such as Anton Kandinsky and Jurij Solovij were hung in the galleries.
