= Joan Truckenbrod =

American digital artist

- Born: 1945 (age 80–81); Greensboro, North Carolina, U.S.
- Education: School of the Art Institute of Chicago
- Known for: digital art

Joan Truckenbrod (born 1945 in Greensboro, North Carolina) is an American artist. She is known for her work in digital art, and is credited as being one of the earliest pioneers of digital art in the 1960s. She uses sculptural forms in video to explore "the simultaneous experience of multiple realities that is evoked through ritual." An essential aspect of her artwork is "making things by hand, integrating hand construction with the electronic imagery of video".

== Early life ==
She received an MFA degree at the School of the Art Institute of Chicago in 1979. Truckenbrod began her work with creating line drawing in 1975 using the computer program in Fortran programming language. She created fiber textiles in 1978 and 1979 "using heat transfer color prints hand-ironed onto fabric". She also created one of the first courses in the computer graphics called "Creative Computer Imaging".

== Career ==
In November 1999, she has a personal show in the Wright Art Center at Beloit College. Her artworks were exhibited at the Beacon Street Gallery in Chicago during October 1999, and at Intermedia Arts Gallery in Minneapolis during November 1999.

Her work has been featured in international exhibitions, and she has had solo shows in Paris, London, Chicago, and Berlin. She has been awarded a Fulbright Fellowship (1997), a Scandinavian-American Foundation Fellowship (1994), and an Illinois Arts Council Grant (1994) and a Fellowship at Kala Art Institute. She has been credited with being the first Chicago-based artist to have an art show on the internet.

She has been an instructor at Northern Illinois University and a Professor in the Art and Technology Department at the School of the Art Institute of Chicago where she has been teaching a course titled Electronic Ritual and Ceremony. In 2003 her artwork was featured on the cover of the Surface Design Journal and in an article by Polly Ullrich. At the exhibition Fiber Focus 2003 her fiber installation named Emerge received the Surface Design Award.

== Books featuring her artwork ==
- The Computer in the Visual Arts, by Anne Morgan Spalter, Addison Wesley, 1998.
- Drawing: Space, Form & Expression, by Wayne Enstice, Prentice Hall, 1994.
- Designing the Future, by Robin Baker, Thames and Hudson, New York, 1994.
- Art of the Electronic Age, by Frank Popper, Harry Abrams, New York, 1993.
- Photographic Possibilities, by Robert Hirsch, Focal Press, 1991.
- Digital Visions, by Cynthia Goodman, Harry Abrams, New York, 1987.
- Drawing With Computers, Mark Wilson, Putman/ Perigee, 1985.
