= Art Preserve =

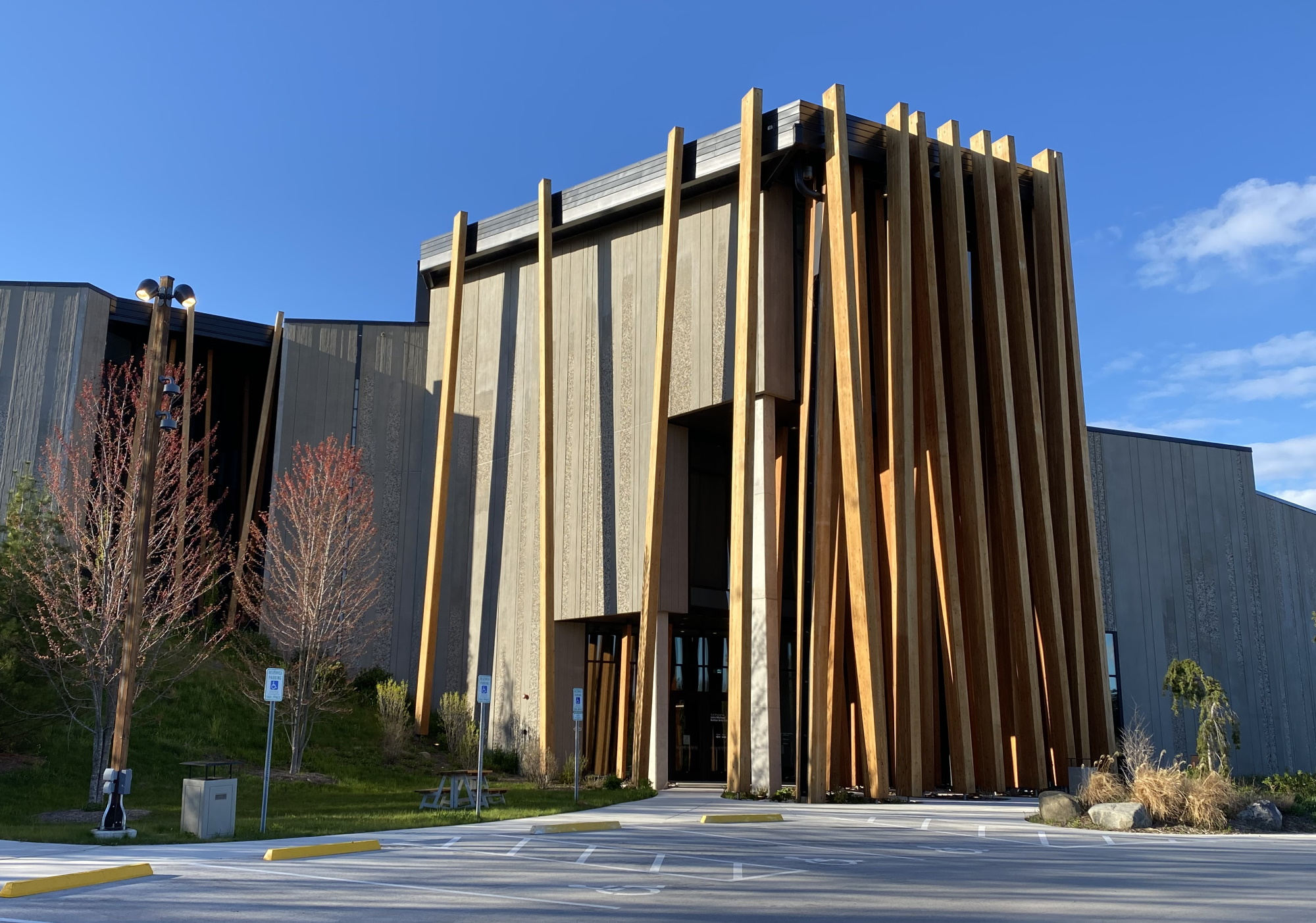
- Location: 3636 Lower Falls Road; Sheboygan, Wisconsin, U.S.
- Coordinates: 43°44′35″N 87°45′17″W
- Type: Art museum
- Founder: Ruth DeYoung Kohler II
- Executive director: Sam Gappmayer
- Architect: Tres Birds
- Owner: John Michael Kohler Arts Center
- Public transit access: Shoreline Metro
- Website: artpreserve.org

The Art Preserve is an art museum and a satellite campus of the John Michael Kohler Arts Center. The preserve houses a collection of artist-built environments and sculptural works. It is designed by Tres Birds and located in Sheboygan, Wisconsin. Opened in June 2021, the Art Preserve is the first museum dedicated to the exhibition, preservation, and care of artist-built environments. The museum also serves as a research space for the art environment genre.

== History ==
The museum was first envisioned by Ruth DeYoung Kohler II, who served as director of the John Michael Kohler Arts Center from 1972 to 2016. Kohler traveled through rural Wisconsin as a child and became fascinated with artist-built environments, in particular Fred Smith's Wisconsin Concrete Park. Kohler worked throughout her life to preserve and display these artist-built environments.

The artist-built environment genre of art-making refers to spaces transformed by an artist to express their personal identity, culture, or history. These spaces can include homes, gardens, parks, or built structures covered with art. While artist-built environments are designed to be permanent or semi-permanent, they often require care and preservation in order to maintain the original artistic integrity.

== Design ==
The three-story building of the museum is 56,000 sq ft (5,200 m^{2}), on a 38-acre (15 ha) site. Ruth DeYoung Kohler II was committed to the idea that the building should include natural materials such as stone, wood, and earth, as a sign of respect for the materials often utilized by artists in creating the art environments held in the collection. The Art Preserve was built into a hill, with construction beginning in 2016. The museum was designed by the Denver-based architectural firm Tres Birds using timber, concrete, and river stones from the nearby Sheboygan River. Eighty percent of the building is made from local ground rock. The building was also designed to shade itself in order to protect the art inside. The museum's four artist-designed washrooms respond to the collection and continue in the tradition of the John Michael Kohler Arts Center washrooms. The washrooms at the Art Preserve were designed by Michelle Grabner, Beth Lipman, and the team of Joy Feasley and Paul Swenbeck with Kohler Co. materials.

== Collection ==
The first floor of the building is dedicated to the history of the preserve, its focus on Wisconsin artists, and the acquisition of Eugene Von Bruenchenhein's work. The second floor upends the assumptions made about artist-built environments and shows works by artists from the mainstream art world and urban areas. The third floor contains fully immersive artist-built environments.

Many artist-built environments in the collection were originally domestic spaces, as artists in this genre frequently blur the lines between studio, home, and gallery. The environments in the collection include more than 25,000 objects by over 30 artists. The collection includes works by Eugene Von Bruenchenhein, Emery Blagdon, Loy Bowlin, Lenore Tawney, Dr. Charles Smith, Mary Nohl, Vollis Simpson and Ray Yoshida.

== See also ==
- John Michael Kohler Arts Center
