= Roger Brown (artist) =

American artist and painter (1941–1997)

- Born: James Roger Brown; December 10, 1941; Hamilton, Alabama, U.S.
- Died: November 22, 1997 (aged 55); Atlanta, Georgia, U.S.
- Education: School of the Art Institute of Chicago (BFA, MFA)
- Movement: Chicago Imagists

Roger Brown (December 10, 1941 – November 22, 1997) was an American artist and painter. Often associated with the Chicago Imagist groups, he was internationally known for his distinctive painting style and shrewd social commentaries on politics, religion, and art.

== Early life ==
Roger Brown was born on December 10, 1941, and raised in Hamilton and Opelika, Alabama. He was described in his formative years as a creative child, an inclination his parents are said to have encouraged. Brown took art classes from second to ninth grade, and won first prize in a statewide poster competition in tenth grade.

After high school Brown left the South. Although he lived much of his adult life elsewhere, he maintained his connection to the region both in his artwork and research, and later with his plan to purchase the "Rock House" in Beulah, Alabama.

== Influences ==
During childhood Brown was close with his grandparents, especially his great-grandmother, Mammy. This experience instilled an early interest in his family's origins, later inspiring extensive research into his family's genealogy. This research was expressed artistically in a number of paintings that track family relationships, most notably "Autobiography in the Shape of Alabama (Mammyʼs Door)" and in references to Elvis Presley, who was a distant cousin.

His upbringing in the southern United States also led to a deep interest in the material culture of the South, especially in folk art and hand made, functional objects. From his adolescent and teen years he took influences from the aesthetics of comics, theatre, architecture and interiors and streamlined Art Deco and machine-age design. Additionally, the influence of his religious upbringing in the independent, fundamentalist Church of Christ was formative and lasting.

While attending the School of the Art Institute Chicago (SAIC) from 1962 to 1970, Brown was introduced to a range of art historical periods and genres, gravitating to Pre-Renaissance Italian art, Surrealism, American artists Edward Hopper, Grant Wood, and Georgia O'Keeffe, and the tribal art of many cultures. Painter Ray Yoshida and art historian Whitney Halstead, both professors at SAIC, also greatly influenced Brown's practice. Both included folk, popular, and self-taught art within the scope of their teaching, genres which Brown sustained enthusiastic interest in throughout his life. Other influences stemming from Brown's SAIC days include the legendary Maxwell Street market, antique and thrift stores, and amusement parks.

Travel was also a source for inspiration and subject matter throughout Brown's artistic career; experiences throughout the U.S.—where he took frequent road trips—and in Mexico, Europe, Russia, and Africa found expression in both his paintings and in his collections.

Brown became known as an astute and intuitive collector, a practice he began during childhood. His collections inspired much of his work throughout his thirty-odd year career. His Chicago collection was preserved, as he left it, at the Roger Brown Study Collection of the School of the Art Institute of Chicago. The RBSC archive contains materials from Brown's collections from homes in New Buffalo, Michigan, and La Conchita, California. In late 2024, the SAIC announced that it would transfer the art and archives to the John Michael Kohler Arts Center Art Preserve.

== Collecting ==
Collected art and objects functioned as important source materials for Brown's work and were an integral part of his practice and discipline. Collecting was a pursuit shared by many of his Chicago colleagues, and reflected a collecting sensibility in Chicago. Brown didn't claim to be a curator, but felt that objects would gravitate towards like objects, establishing visual and associative dialogues along the way. Brown's collection includes the work of many of his friends and colleagues including Ray Yoshida, Karl Wirsum, Barbara Rossi, Jim Nutt, Don Baum, and Christina Ramberg, among others. Brown collected works by a vast array of self-taught artists including 36 works by Joseph Yoakum, a major work by Henry Darger, birdhouse cathedrals by Aldo Piacenza, hand painted text works by Jesse Howard, and many others. Artworks and objects from outside America reflect Brown's travels and aesthetic interests. These include Yoruba twin figures, Baule masks, Guerrero masks, Hopi katsina, molas, and many other objects from very diverse locations and traditions.

The display of these objects was influenced by Chicago Imagist artist Ray Yoshida's display technique, utilizing simple white shelves densely populated with wide-ranging objects. It is notable that Brown displayed all of the objects in his collection as holding equal value no matter their background or provenance. Today this democratic treatment of objects is continued at the RBSC, with each object treated as a museum artifact.

== Education ==
After graduating from high school in 1960 Brown attended David Lipscomb College in Nashville, Tennessee, where he briefly pursued his interest in entering the ministry. In the fall of 1962 Brown moved to Chicago, where he took classes at the American Academy of Art before enrolling at the School of the Art Institute of Chicago (SAIC). His first experience at SAIC was brief, and in 1963 he returned to the American Academy of Art, where he completed a commercial design program in 1964. He then returned to SAIC as a full-time student from 1965 to 1970, where he committed to a fine art focus that would lead to his prolific career over the next three decades. In 1968 Brown received his Bachelor of Fine Art and in 1970 he was awarded his Master of Fine Art, both from SAIC. With his MFA Brown also received Edward L. Ryerson Traveling Fellowship, which supported travels throughout Europe and Egypt, where he collected objects, images, and inspiration.

== Early career ==
Brown developed a mature visual vocabulary in the late 1960s, with visual themes including silhouetted figures, nocturnal cityscapes, and theatre facades and interiors. Encouraged by Yoshida and Halsted, Brown and his colleagues began to look to the work of self-taught artists, visiting Joseph Yoakum, Aldo Piacenza, William Dawson, Lee Godie, and others. Brown became an ardent champion for the validity of such works as equal or superior to works from the mainstream. Exploring and documenting art environments and the vernacular landscape became an ongoing pursuit.

== Mid-career ==
World's Tallest Disaster (1972) at the Smithsonian American Art Museum in 2023

Brown's first solo exhibit at Phyllis Kind Gallery (Chicago, 1971) began his 26-year representation at PKG in Chicago (beginning in 1970) and New York (beginning in 1975). Although affiliated with the Chicago Imagist school throughout his career, Brown's work evolved beyond the indeterminate definition of that "school." In the early 1970s he received acclaim for his paintings of stylized landscapes and cityscapes as stark backdrops for aspects of contemporary life as well as the "Disasters" series (1972), paintings of exploding buildings, followed by a procession of iconic, flat-patterned landscapes.

Brown's critical acclaim grew in the 1970s and 1980s. He became known for responding to 20th-century life through works that addressed a range of subjects and issues: natural, architectural and urban landscapes, the dichotomy of nature and culture, disasters of all types, current and political events, social, religious, and popular culture, autobiographical, personal, and sexual issues, the art world in many guises, cosmology, mortality, history, mythology, transformation, transportation, and the weather. He used the weather as an allegorical backdrop for the larger physical and metaphysical forces that dwarf the human endeavor.

Rising Above it All (1978)

In addition to painting and printmaking, Brown's mediums eventually included sculpture of found, assembled, and painted objects, theatre and opera sets, and mosaic murals. In 1979 he designed sets for the Chicago Opera Theatre's production of Mozart's "Cosi fan Tutte."

=== Chicago Imagists ===
Early on, Brown, along with many of his colleagues, was recognized by curator Don Baum, who organized spirited "Chicago School" exhibitions at the Hyde Park Art Center from 1966 to 1971. Brown's work was shown there in the group exhibition "False Image" (1968, 69). From these early HPAC exhibitions, a loosely associated group of artists became known as Chicago Imagists, a term coined by art critic Franz Schulz (1972). They did not form a group, adopt the name, or have a shared ideology, but they did work independently of New York contemporary art trends and incorporated imagery from popular culture into their works, although less cerebrally than New York Pop artists.

== Later career ==
In the late 1980s Brown adapted his work and collecting disciplines to Southern California, moving into a home and studio (designed by Stanley Tigerman) in La Conchita, in 1993. Still addressing a broad range of subjects in his works, Brown created condensed, serial works that focused on California experiences, including a series of ominous cloud-scapes, paintings of rose trees and shrubs; a series of Virtual Still Life object paintings (27 paintings with projecting shelves holding ceramic objects); and metaphorical explorations of Bonsai, his final sequence.

In 1991 Brown created two Italian glass mosaic murals entitled "Arts and Sciences of the Ancient World: The Flight of Daedalus" and "Icarus and Arts and Sciences of the Modern World: La Salle Corridor with Holding Pattern". These were installed on the façade and in the lobby of the Ahmanson Commercial Development Company, a subsidiary of Home Savings of America, at 120 North LaSalle St., Chicago. His second large scale mural was the "City of the Big Shoulders" commissioned by The Equitable for the NBC building at Cityfront Center, Chicago and located in the west lobby of the 455 North Columbus Building. His third (untitled) mosaic mural is a tribute to the African burial ground, discovered during the excavation for the Ted Weiss Federal Building at 290 Broadway, New York City, dedicated in 1995. In September 1997 the mosaic mural "Hull House, Cook County, Howard Brown: A Tradition of Helping", designed by Brown, was dedicated at the Howard Brown Health Center in Chicago.

== Exhibitions ==
Brown's exhibition history is extensive. He was represented by the Phyllis Kind Gallery in Chicago and New York, and his work was shown in numerous solo and group exhibitions in museums and galleries around the country and abroad. Major retrospectives of his work were mounted at the Montgomery Museum of Fine Arts in 1980, and at The Hirshhorn Museum and Sculpture Garden in 1987. In 2019, as a part of the Alabama 200 Celebration, The Jule Collins Smith Museum of Fine Art presented a survey of work by him and his brother, Greg Brown, in Creative Cadences. He is represented in many major museum collections including the Art Institute of Chicago, Museum of Contemporary Art (Chicago), Crocker Art Museum, Jule Collins Smith Museum of Fine Art at Auburn University, Metropolitan Museum of Art, Whitney Museum of American Art, Museum of Modern Art, Corcoran Gallery of Art, High Museum of Art, Milwaukee Art Museum, and the Scottish National Gallery of Modern Art.

== Homes ==
Brown owned homes, studios, and gardens in Chicago, Illinois; New Buffalo, Michigan; and La Conchita, California. He was in the process of developing his final home and studio in Beulah, Alabama, at the time of his death. The School of the Art Institute Chicago became the primary repository for Brown's personal, professional, and artistic effects. SAIC operates his New Buffalo, MI retreat as a residency facility for SAIC faculty and staff. His Chicago collection was formalized into the Roger Brown Study Collection, a house museum, archive, and special collection in 1997.

=== Chicago ===
In 1974 Brown purchased a storefront in Chicago at 1926 North Halsted Street, which became his first home, studio, and collection environment. Brown donated the home and its contents to the School of the Art Institute Chicago which maintained it as the Roger Brown Study Collection, a house museum and special collection, serving SAIC as an academic resource, and open to the public by appointment, until the RBSC was transferred to the John Michael Kohler Arts Center Art Preserve. This decision sparked controversy and a push to landmark Brown's Chicago house.

=== Michigan ===
Brown commissioned his partner, architect George Veronda, to design a home and studio for a Lake Michigan dunes property he purchased in New Buffalo, Michigan. The Veronda Pavilion, a residence, and the Roger Brown Studio and Guest House were completed in 1979. Throughout the 1980s Brown divided his time between Chicago and New Buffalo, where he assembled a second collection of art and objects, and developed a garden.

The pavilion and studio/guest house are steel and glass modernist structures tucked into a secluded dunes landscape between the Galien River and a beachfront road. Parallels can be drawn between Veronda's design these buildings and Mies van der Rohe's Farnsworth House (Plano, IL, 1950). The Pavilion and Guest House contain furnishings designed by Veronda, as well as Brown's collection, including works by contemporary artists, tribal sculpture and textiles, works by folk and self-taught artists, and examples of Brown's own work.

Brown's Michigan home and studio provided him with a new source of inspiration not previously available to him in the city: nature and a continually changing landscape. Here is where Brown first began experimenting with landscape design, surrounding the buildings with a swath of native grasses and flowers, and later planting several hundred rose shrubs. He also installed sculptures including a large sheet metal cross, reproduction Roman busts, sundry architectural ornaments, sculptures by "Joe the Welder", and other objects.

In 1995 Brown gave his New Buffalo property to SAIC with the intention that it serve as a retreat for SAIC faculty and staff. The Studio, Pavilion and Guest House have been used since 1996 by SAIC faculty and full-time staff, who may apply for two-week residencies through the faculty enrichment and sabbatical programs.

In Spring 2007 SAIC's Historic Landscape Studio class (offered through SAIC's Historic Preservation graduate program), taught by Carol Yetken, undertook a project to research the landscape history of New Buffalo property, and create a preservation plan. The New Buffalo facility is used by SAIC faculty and staff year-round and is not open to the public.

=== California ===
In the late 1980s Brown searched for a place to live on the west coast. He found property in the beach town of La Conchita, north of Ventura, with a Spartan "Royal Mansion" trailer. In 1993 home and studio, designed by architect Stanley Tigerman, was completed. Though he originally planned to live in the trailer and build a studio alongside it, in the final plans the trailer served as a guest house. The architecture for the main home studio structure, which he referred to as the "Temple of Painting," was conceived as part barn, part basilica, with a Romanesque clerestory, corrugated roof, and stucco painted a deep salmon-pink, inspired by the color of the La Purisima Mission in nearby Lompoc. An important feature of the La Conchita house—and one that was specifically stipulated by Brown in all of his homes—was the presence of a large expanse of white walls on which he could display his collection.

As with his other homes, Brown filled this house and garden with collected objects—well over 1,500 in total by the time he bequeathed the estate to SAIC—referred to in scholarly material as his La Conchita Collection. The breadth of objects included was comparable to his other collections, with everything from formal paintings to African objects to everyday objects. However the La Conchita collection can be seen to reflect his California environment, featuring an extensive array of nearly 500 ceramic objects featuring objects by amateurs, regional factory-made wares, and Mexican wares by families or studios. The contents and direction of this collection was guided both by Brown's own exploration of the environment and by the network of friends and colleagues he established in California, namely his friend Lisa Cathcart, director of Casa Dolores, Center for the Study of the Popular Arts of Mexico.

Brown bequeathed the La Conchita home and collection to SAIC in 1997. The house has since been sold, and much of the collection has been archived. Brown's Spartan trailer now resides at the Museum of Jurassic Technology in Culver City, California (along with a collection of similar mobile residences). In addition to Brown's original furnishings and decor, the Spartan now also showcases a series of models depicting different views of the trailer made by artist, SAIC Associate Professor and RBSC Curator Nicholas Lowe. Surrounding the trailer in its new location is a reconstruction of part of Brown's La Conchita garden. Portions of Brown's La Conchita garden are also replicated at Casa Dolores.

=== Alabama ===
In 1997 Brown was in the process of developing a fourth home/studio/collection environment in an 1870s stone house in Beulah, Alabama, with the vision of "coming full circle" and have his Alabama home. This house, known as the Rock House, was only 15 miles from his parents' home in Alabama. Brown first documented the Rock House on super-8 film as a child. Upon purchasing the Rock House as an adult, Brown sent all the furnishings––the beginnings of another collection––of rugs, quilts, and examples of his own work to his brother Greg Brown, for installation into the house.

Brown died on November 22, 1997. The project was completed by his parents and brother, and opened as the Roger Brown Rock House Museum in 1999. The family added to Brown's collection of objects for the Alabama house after his death, contributing personal artifacts and family memorabilia.

== Personal life ==
Roger Brown was a gay man. In 1972 he met architect George Veronda (1941–1984) and the two formed a strong artistic and romantic relationship. Veronda was diagnosed with lung cancer in 1983 and died in 1984. Brown frequented venues like The Gold Coast, one of Chicago's first gay leather bars, and included elements of cruising culture in some of his paintings.

Brown was diagnosed as HIV positive in 1988 and by 1993 was living with AIDS. Themes related to the HIV/AIDS pandemic appeared in Brown's work in the 1980s and continued throughout the rest of his career although he never wished to be a "one note artist" and continued to draw subject matter from almost every aspect of 20th century American culture. Despite experiencing painful side effects from medications and periods of hospitalization, the final years of Brown's life were some of his most productive. Between 1993 and 1997, Brown completed more than eighty paintings, and planned and executed home, studio, and garden designs. One of Brown's final large scale projects was a mosaic for the Howard Brown Health Center, a Chicago organization that provides healthcare to LGBTQ individuals.

Roger Brown died on November 22, 1997, and was survived by his parents, James and Mary Elizabeth Brown and his brother Greg Brown. Brown was honored posthumously by the Chicago Commission on Human Relations' Advisory Council on Lesbian, Gay, Bisexual, and Transgender Issues and was inducted into the LGBT Hall of Fame in 2004. Brown's work was featured in the exhibitions Roger Brown: This Boy's Own Story, curated by Kate Pollasch, and a project of the Roger Brown Study Collection and Art AIDS America Chicago, a landmark exhibition which explored the way the AIDS crisis impacted art and culture.

== Other ==
In 2004 Roger Brown was inducted into the Chicago Gay and Lesbian Hall of Fame.

== Public collections ==
- The Art Institute of Chicago, Chicago, IL
- Hirshhorn Museum and Sculpture Garden, Washington, D.C.
- Crocker Art Museum, Sacramento, CA
- Indianapolis Museum of Art, Indianapolis, IN
- Jule Collins Smith Museum of Fine Art, Auburn, AL
- Kalamazoo Institute of Arts, Kalamazoo, MI
- Los Angeles County Museum of Art, Los Angeles, CA
- Madison Museum of Contemporary Art, Madison, WI
- Memphis Brooks Museum of Art, Memphis, TN
- Metropolitan Museum of Art, New York, NY
- Milwaukee Art Museum, Milwaukee, WI
- Museum Boijmans Van Beuningen, Rotterdam, Netherlands
- Museum of Modern Art, New York, NY
- National Gallery of Art , Washington, D.C.
- Nelson-Atkins Museum of Art, Kansas City, MO
- North Carolina Museum of Art, Raleigh, NC
- Scottish National Gallery, Edinburgh, Scotland
- Smithsonian American Art Museum, Smithsonian Institution, Washington, D.C.
- Whitney Museum, New York, NY
- Art Preserve of the John Michael Kohler Arts Center, Sheboygan, WI
