= Dr. Charles Smith =

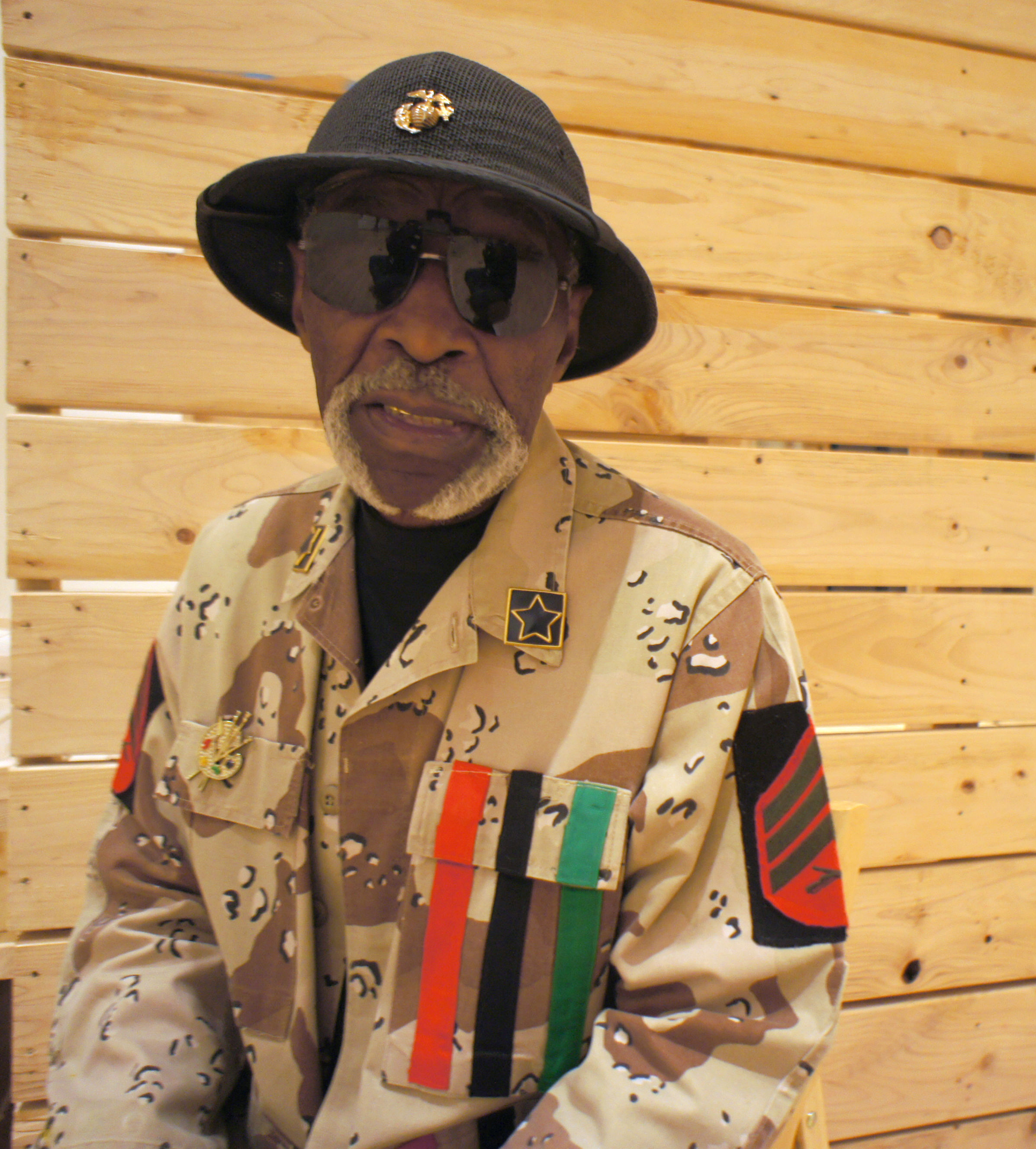
- Artist Dr. Charles Smith
- Born: Charles Smith; November 11, 1940 (age 85); New Orleans
- Known for: Sculpture; Art Environments; Installation Art

Dr. Charles Smith (born 1940, New Orleans, Louisiana) is a visual artist, historian, activist and minister who lives and works in Hammond, Louisiana. His sculptural work focuses on African and African American history.

== Early life and education ==
Charles Smith was born in New Orleans in 1940 to Bertha Mary Smith. When Smith was 14 his father was drowned in a hate crime. His mother moved him and his two sisters to Chicago after his father's racially motivated murder. They lived in the diverse Maxwell Street District near 14th Street. A year later, in 1955, Mrs. Smith took Charles to view the body of Emmett Till at the Roberts Temple Church of God. These experiences helped to seed Smith's understanding of racism in the States.

In 1964 Smith worked for Trans World Airlines and as a postal carrier, working the two jobs in order to save money to purchase a home for his new wife and himself. In 1966 Smith was drafted into the Marine Corps where he spent two years in Vietnam, being honorably discharged with a Purple Heart in 1968 due to injury. The physical impact of Agent Orange caused health issues that continue to this day. He was also severely psychologically and spiritually impacted from experiences there, resulting in Smith's divorce and increasing posttraumatic stress disorder through 18 years of post-combat struggle before finding his calling as an artist.

Besides his formal studies at the Virginia Black Training Academy, for his numerous years of life experience, studying and wisdom, Smith began using his self-imposed title, as an equivalency to a PhD.

== Career ==
Thematically, Charles' work confronts what he sees as the erasure of Black history by recreating scenes and icons of those narratives in a formula of concrete and mixed media of his invention. His work is created and in situ is housed primarily outdoors. In 2000, he co-founded the Algiers Folk Art Zone & Blues Museum along with artist Charles Gillam Sr.

=== Aurora, Illinois ===
In 1986 Smith began fourteen years of often twelve-hour-day cathartic creative work on his home in Aurora, Illinois as an art environment. He said God told him to make art as a weapon to combat his depression, pain and anger. He built sculptures and monuments to memorialize moments in Black history and racism. He began with his own experience and struggle as a US Marine Corps veteran and has documented moments before American slavery through the present. He established this outdoor museum as the non-profit African American History Museum and Black Veteran's Archive. His Aurora site culminated in 600 sculptures and 150 fixed pieces. The Art Institute of Chicago named his museum a Millennium Site in 1999.

Smith is one of three living artists whose work is part of the John Michael Kohler Art Center's permanent collection. The Kohler Foundation purchased 448 of Smith's work from his Aurora, Illinois in 2000, of which 200 remained in their Art Center's permanent collection.

Smith maintains a relationship to Aurora Illinois, having set up a foundation to care for the site after his departure. In 2004 there was an opening celebration cosigned by Kane County and Aurora Township with tourism in mind. Despite this first property falling to disrepair and precarious community support, the remaining sculptures still paint a narrative that draws tourists. Emmett Till's mother, Mamie Till, wrote Smith a letter thanking him for creating a work so impactful.

=== Hammond, Louisiana ===
In 2002 Smith was traveling to New Orleans to help his ailing mother when he stopped to rest and found a grave stone of Peter Hammond's "Unnamed Slave Boy." This became a calling for him to relocate to Hammond, Louisiana and has established his second art environment and a new Museum there.

The Hammond site's house references Egyptian architecture and ancient tomb and is boldly painted black and white. The steps to the front door read, "Trust God."

== Exhibitions ==
In 2022, Dr. Smith had his first solo New York City gallery exhibition at White Columns. The exhibition featured twenty-nine new figurative sculptural works created specifically for a gallery context as well as photographic murals depicting the African-American History Museum + Black Veterans’ Archive. Some of his sculptures portrayed figures like Phyllis Wheatley, Gordon Parks, Diana Ross, Iceberg Slim, Paul Robeson, and Mother Consuella York.

Smith's work is in the permanent collection of the Smithsonian American Art Museum.

His work was included in Life, Liberty & Pursuit of Happiness at the American Visionary Art Museum in 2010.

In 2017 he lectured at the African American Men of Unity in Aurora and at The Road Less Traveled conference in Sheboygan, Wisconsin. His work was auctioned at the New Orleans Botanical Garden benefit in 2017.

His work was included in The Kohler Art Center's 50th Anniversary exhibition series, The Road Less Traveled in 2017-18. His exhibition for this series was honored as the number two selection for "Best of 2017" in Art Forum magazine.

In 2018 Smith's work was included the 10-artist exhibition, Chicago Calling: Art Against the Flow, curated by Lisa Stone and Kenneth Burkhart at Intuit: The Center for Intuitive and Outsider Art as part of Art Design Chicago. Included in the exhibit with Smith's work were works by Henry Darger, Gregory Warmack (known as “Mr. Imagination”), Joseph Yoakum and Lee Godie. Smith was the only living artist in the exhibition.

In 1995 Charles Smith's sculpture and his African/American Heritage museum, Aurora, Il site were presented in an exhibit "Straight At The Heart" at The Wright Museum of Art, Beloit College, Beloit, WI, curated by Debra N. Mancoff, PhD.

== Works ==
Smith heavily uses metaphor, symbolism, news stories, historical narratives and his own experiences in the formal choices and spatial relationships of his sculptures to create his dense art environments. Visitors weave around the pieces following his often life-sized dioramas and the literal path he has made for tours. Besides his life experience, his motivation is to heal the world by educating people about Black history through his work. The installation was constantly evolving and changing as Smith built new work. "Everything moves along extemporaneously as God moves me. He shows me how to do it, where to put it, and how to construct it." Smith said.

Middle Passage was created out of large rock, broken concrete, and wood. It depicted the narrative of Black people in Africa, going through the Middle Passage and into slavery. The work was installed on North Avenue at South Kendall Street in Aurora, Illinois. The sculpture acted as a perimeter protecting to his environment and went on to include imagery from the Civil Rights Movement, all with three-quarters to life sized figures. Most of his work is built with found materials with a cement mixture covering armatures and then painted. He calls the patina the sculptures gain through exposure to the outdoor elements "weatherization."

Sergeant Ramey was at the center of his Aurora property atop his roof. It is a memorial depicting one of Smith's close friends who died in combat, a memory that stays with Smith.

Smith's goal has been to teach Black youth about their history and he wants to have work installed at certain points along I-55 to memorialize not only the Great Migration but also his family's migration from New Orleans to Chicago. Each site would document and offer healing lessons on Black history.

== Personal life ==
Smith was married in 1964 and divorced after his return from combat in 1968. Alongside his sculptural work Smith was an ordained minister. He was a pastor at God's House of Prayer and Holiness in Memphis Tennessee.

Much of his work outside of his sculpture is working to help heal people psychologically. He's advocated for other Vietnam veterans, worked with the Congressional Black Caucus on Agent Orange and on Jesse Jackson's PUSH coalition.
