= Ruth DeYoung Kohler II =

American teacher and museum director

Ruth DeYoung Kohler II (October 24, 1941 – November 14, 2020) was a museum director and teacher from Wisconsin who championed under-recognized, self-taught artists and vernacular art. She was the director of the John Michael Kohler Arts Center from 1972 to 2016. She led the development of the Art Preserve in Sheboygan, Wisconsin, the first museum dedicated to the exhibition and conservation of artist-built environments.

== Early life ==
Kohler was born in Chicago, Illinois to mother Ruth DeYoung Kohler and father Herbert Vollrath Kohler Sr. on October 24, 1941. Her father served as Executive Chairman of Kohler Co., and her mother was a journalist and women's rights advocate. Kohler attended the Ferry Hall School in Lake Forest, Illinois. She earned her Bachelor of Arts in art and art history from Smith College, and spent her junior year studying at the University of Hamburg. She went on for graduate work at the University of Wisconsin.

== Career ==
Kohler's passion for artist-built environments began when her father took her for drives in Wisconsin. Kohler began working as an art teacher in Beloit, Wisconsin, and then founded the printmaking program at the University of Alberta in Canada. She moved to Spain in 1963 to study cave paintings of the Paleolithic Era, and worked as an artist there. In 1967 the John Michael Kohler Arts Center was established, and as her father's health was declining at the time, she returned to Sheboygan to care for him and took up volunteering at the Center, before becoming the assistant director in 1968 and director in 1972. According to Kohler, some members of the arts center's board of directors were not eager "to hire a woman or anyone with the last name of Kohler".

Kohler developed an Arts/Industry residency program in 1974. Early on as director of the John Michael Kohler Arts Center, Kohler also visited Fred Smith's Wisconsin Concrete Park, and afterwards became determined to preserve and restore similar artistic spaces. She also directed the John Michael Kohler Arts Center to preserve over 6,000 objects from Eugene Von Bruenchenhein after his death in 1983. In 2016 Kohler became the John Michael Kohler Arts Center's Director of Special Initiatives. She also served on the Kohler Foundation, Inc., board from 1969 to 2019, serving as its president from 1999 until 2006.

Toward the end of her life, Kohler envisioned the Art Preserve, which opened June 26, 2021, in Sheboygan, Wisconsin. Kohler was committed to the idea that the building should include natural materials such as stone, wood, and earth, as a sign of respect for the materials often used by artists in creating the art environments held in the Arts Center's collection. The Art Preserve was built into a hill, and designed by the Denver-based architectural firm Tres Birds using timber, concrete, and river stones from the nearby Sheboygan River. The museum currently houses about 25,000 objects, the largest collection of artist-built environments in the world.

== Death ==
Kohler's grave (left) at Woodland Kohler Village Cemetery

Kohler died on November 14, 2020, and was buried at Woodland Kohler Village Cemetery.

== Legacy ==
Mount Kohler was named for Ruth and her brother Herbert Jr., in recognition of their father's financial contribution to the Byrd Antarctic Expedition.

The Ruth Foundation for the Arts, with a bequest from Kohler, began providing its first grants in 2022. The foundation plans to give away up to US$20 million per year, and aims to provide funds for unconventional forms of art.

== Books ==
- Umberger, Doss (2007). Sublime spaces and visionary worlds : built environments of vernacular artists. Erika Doss, Ruth D. Kohler, Lisa Stone, Jane Bianco. Princeton Architectural Press. ISBN 978-1-56898-728-6. OCLC 1126361157.
- Berg, Louise; Fred Fussell; Eleanor Jung; Laura Kohler; Marie Christine Kohler; Ruth DeYoung Kohler ll; Lisa Stone; Bradley Strudsup; Terri Yoho (2018). Kohler Foundation: A History. Kohler, Wisconsin: Kohler Foundation. ISBN 9781935861126. OCLC 1091190645.

== Honors and awards ==
In 1984 Lakeland College (Wisconsin) awarded Kohler with an honorary doctorate. She was elected a fellow of the Wisconsin Academy of Sciences, Arts, and Letters in 1989, and named an honorary fellow of the American Craft Council in 1992. In 2000, she received an honorary doctorate from the Milwaukee Institute of Art and Design and earned the Smith Medal from Smith College for her leadership in the arts. In 2005, honorary doctorate from the University of Wisconsin-Oshkosh, followed by an honorary doctorate from Edgewood College in 2007, and an honorary doctorate from Alverno College 2012. She has also received the Wisconsin Visual Art Achievement Award in 2005, and the 2015 Visionary Award from the American Folk Art Museum.
