= Ranu Mukherjee =

American contemporary artist based in San Francisco

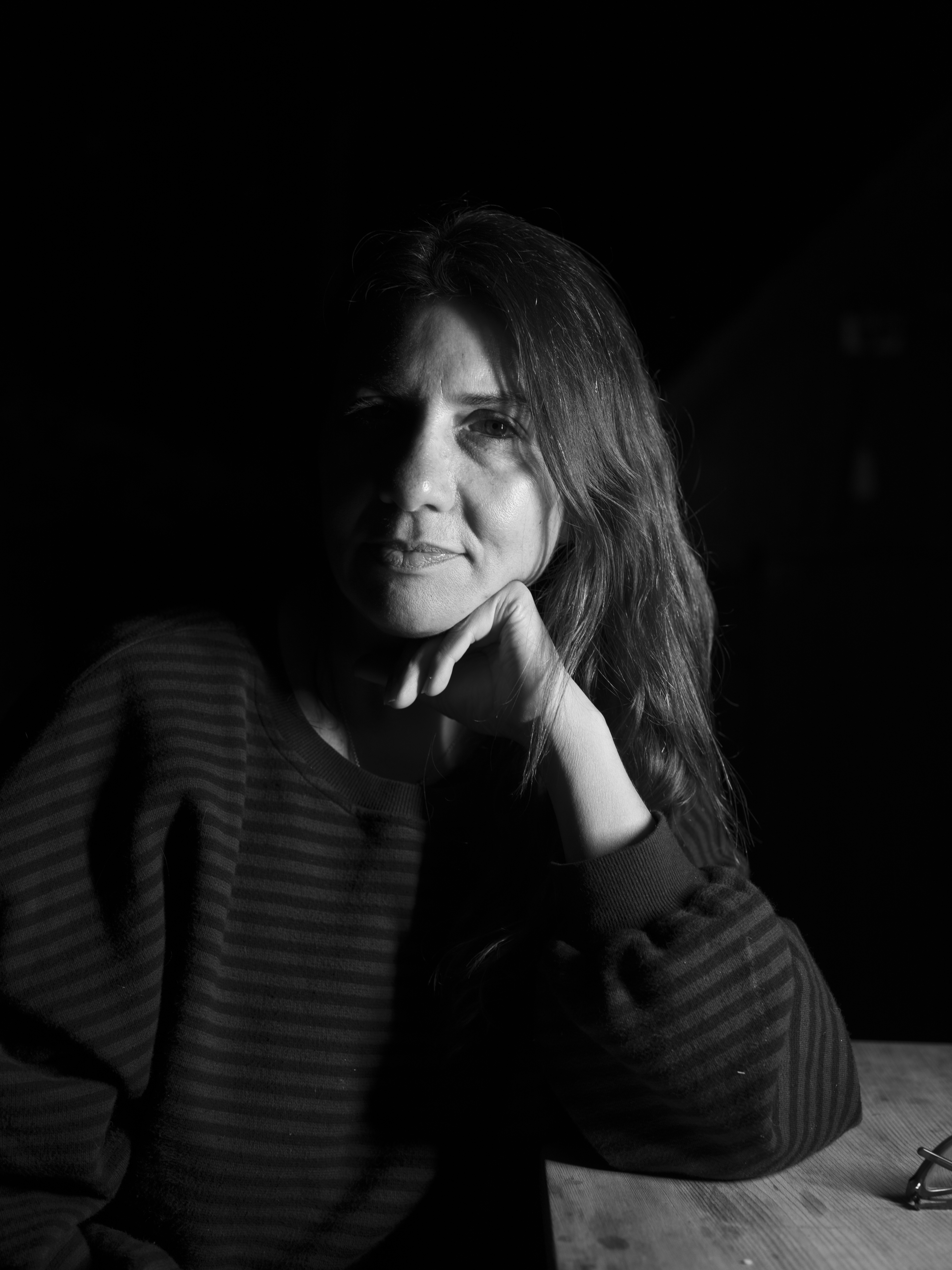
- Born: 1966
- Occupations: Artist; Film Program Chair at the California College of Arts, San Francisco
- Known for: Hybrid art, painting, film, installation, media art, arts educator.
- Website: www.ranumukherjee.com

Ranu Mukherjee (born 1966) is a multi-disciplinary American contemporary artist of Indian and European descent based in San Francisco, California.

Mukherjee's practice includes painting, installation, sculpture, video art, performance, hybrid films, works on paper, and collaborative projects. Her work focuses on processes of creolization, the figure of the nomad, and speculative narratives. Mukherjee’s work also generally refers to embodiment, ecology, science fiction, and the unknown to explore the narrative excess and material conditions brought on by global capitalism.

== Education and career ==
Ranu Mukherjee received her BFA in Painting and Film from the Massachusetts College of Art, Boston, in 1988, and her MFA from the Royal College of Art, London, in 1993.

After earning her degrees in art, she began teaching at Goldsmiths College in London in 1994. In 2002 She moved to San Francisco, California, where she teaches at California College of the Arts.

== Art career ==
Best known for creating strongly colored large scale installations that combine mediums such as print, paint, and drawings, her work has focus on topics such as colonialism, feminism, and ecology.

Mukherjee has stated that most of her work comes from a neo-futurist perspective as she aims to generate creative thinking among her audience. She also penned the term "hybrid film" as a label for her animated art that combines painted, photographic, and digital work into unique pieces.

Ranu Mukherjee co-founded 0rphan Drift, a collaborative artist and avatar, in London in 1994. For a decade, 0rphan Drift collaborated with numerous people on mostly site-specific works. As an artistic entity, 0rphan Drift is known for immersive and visually complex works which use the sample and the remix extensively. It produced video and AV performance, collage, text and print works, and published the cyberpunk novel 0(rphan)<d(rift) Cyberpositive.

In 2006, Ranu Mukherjee and fellow co-founder Maggie Roberts restarted 0rphan Drift as a duo. They believed 0rphan Drift’s approach could be applied to the new era of social media, Artificial Intelligence and virtual reality. In its latest manifestation, 0rphan Drift considers AI through the octopus – as a distributed, many-minded consciousness.

Mukherjee worked solely with the artist collaborative between 1994 and 2005.

Four of her short films were noted in the Momentum Cataloge as showing ordinary images "where the social merges with the material" in digital and no-digital realms.

In December 2025, the Ruth Foundation for the Arts awarded Mukherjee its 2026 Ruth Award.

== Select exhibitions ==
=== Solo exhibitions ===
- 2018 A Bright Stage, de Young Museum, San Francisco, CA
- 2017 Shivery Proof, Pennsylvania College of Art and Design, Lancaster, PA
- 2017 Shadowtime, Gallery Wendy Norris, San Francisco, CA
- 2016 Phantasmagoria, Table Arts Center, Charleston, IL
- 2015 Extracted: A Trilogy by Ranu Mukherjee, Asian Art Museum, San Francisco, CA
- 2016 Phantasmagoric, Los Angeles County Museum of Art, Los Angeles CA
- 2012 Telling Fortunes, San Jose Museum of Art, San Jose, CA

=== Group exhibitions ===
- 2018 "Be Not Still", di Rosa Center for Contemporary Art, Napa, CA

== Collections ==
- San José Museum of Art
- Asian Art Museum, San Francisco

== Publications ==
- Mukherjee, Ranu (December 12, 2017). "Connective Tissue". Art Practical.
- Mukherjee, Ranu (2019-07-03). "Monkey's Fist". Art Journal. 78 (3): 125. doi:10.1080/00043249.2019.1655341.

== Bibliography ==
- Dance Magazine. “Building Bridges.” Dance Magazine. Dance Magazine, October 1, 2020
- “Ranu Mukherjee.” In The Make. Accessed March 19, 2021
- “Ranu Mukherjee - Gallery Wendi Norris: San Francisco.” Gallery Wendi Norris | San Francisco. Gallery Wendi Norris | San Francisco, October 20, 2020
