= Sharron Quasius =

American sculptor (born 1948)

Sharron Quasius (born 1948) is an American sculptor.

Quasius, from Sheboygan, Wisconsin, is best known for her appropriations of classic paintings, which she transforms into large, soft bas reliefs made of stuffed canvas. She was at one time married to the sculptor and restorer Don Howlett, with whom she worked on the restoration of the Wisconsin Concrete Park. Quasius is represented in the collection of the Metropolitan Museum of Art by a terracotta relief of 1982, Washington Crossing the Delaware; another 1982 work, a reinterpretation of Watson and the Shark after John Singleton Copley, is held by the Vero Beach Museum of Art.
