= Beth Lipman =

American glass artist

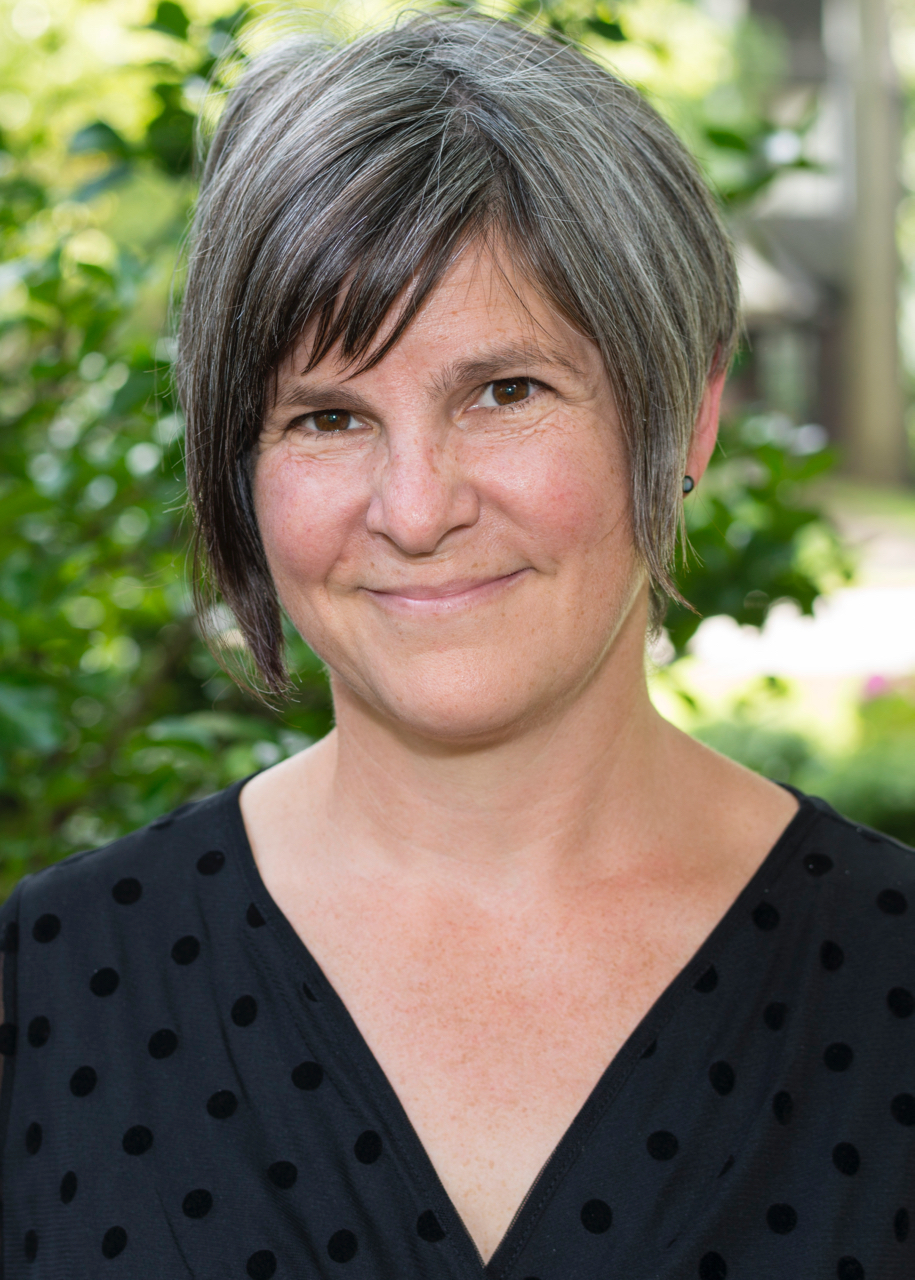
- Born: 1971 (age 54–55); Philadelphia, Pennsylvania
- Education: Tyler School of Art, Temple University, BFA glass and fibers (1994); Massachusetts College of Art (1989-1990)
- Known for: glass
- Notable work: "Bancketje (Banquet)" (2003)
- Style: Contemporary
- Awards: American Craft Council College of Fellows (2018), Smithsonian Artist Research Fellowship (2013), Pollock-Krasner Foundation Grant (2012), United States Artists Berman Bloch Fellow (2011), Louis Comfort Tiffany Foundation Grant (2005)
- Website: www.bethlipman.com

Beth Lipman (born 1971, in Philadelphia, Pennsylvania) is a contemporary artist working in glass. She is best known for her glass still-life compositions which reference the work of 16th- and 17th-century European painters.

== Biography ==
Beth Lipman was born in Philadelphia, Pennsylvania, in 1971. She is an only child, and her family primarily lived in York and Lancaster counties in Pennsylvania. Her family moved around a bit before she turned 3 or 4. Her mother was a self-taught painter whose collection of books on folk painting influenced Lipman at an early age. At 16 she attended a summer art camp at the Horizons New England Craft Program.

Lipman attended the Massachusetts College of Art in 1989, then transferred to the Tyler School of Art at Temple University to finish her degree. She graduated from Tyler in 1994 with a BFA in glass and fibers.

Today, Beth Lipman lives and works in Sheboygan Falls, Wisconsin. Her work is currently represented by Nohra Haime Gallery (NY), Cade Tompkins Projects (RI), and Ferrin Gallery (MA).

== Career ==
While at school, Lipman applied to an apprenticeship at The Fabric Workshop and Museum in Philadelphia. After the apprenticeship, she completed a number of residencies at programs including the John Michael Kohler Arts Center in Sheboygan, WI, in 2003; the Museum of Glass in Tacoma, WA, in 2006; and The Studio at The Corning Museum of Glass, Corning, NY, in 2006 and 2011.

Lipman originally worked as a solo artist, but in 2003 she began working with a team to create large-scale works such as "Bancketje (Banquet)," which was created as part of a residency at WheatonArts, Millville, NJ, and is now part of the collection at the Renwick Gallery of the Smithsonian American Art Museum, Washington, D.C.

In addition to working as an artist, Lipman has held a number of positions. She served as the education director for UrbanGlass in Brooklyn, NY from 1997 until 2000. During that time, she was also the head of the glass department at the Worcester Center for Crafts, Worcester, MA (2002-2004) and the studio director of education and artist services at the Creative Glass Center of America at WheatonArts (2004-2005). From 2005 until 2009, she was the arts/industry coordinator at the John Michael Kohler Arts Center. Lipman has taught at many schools, including New York University, New York, NY; Parsons School of Design, New York, NY; the Corning Museum of Glass; Penland School of Crafts, Penland, NC; and the Pittsburgh Glass Center, Pittsburgh, PA.

== Grants and honors ==
Lipman's work is represented in a number of museum collections, including the Smithsonian American Art Museum; the Brooklyn Museum of Art; the John Michael Kohler Arts Center (WI); the Corning Museum of Glass (NY); the Museum of Art and Design (NY); the Museum of American Glass (NJ); the Norton Museum of Art (FL); the Detroit Institute of Arts; the Kemper Museum of Contemporary Art (MO); the Hunter Museum of Art (TN); the Chrysler Museum of Art (VA); the New Britain Museum of American Art (CT); the Weisman Art Museum (MN); the Museum of Glass, Tacoma, WA; the Milwaukee Art Museum; and the Rhode Island School of Design Museum, among others.

She has won numerous awards and honors, including induction into the American Craft Council's College of Fellows (2018), the Virginia Groot Foundational Grant (2014), Smithsonian Artist Research Fellowship (2013), the Pollock-Krasner Foundation Grant (2012), the United States Artists Berman Bloch Fellow (2011), the UrbanGlass Young Talent Award (2006), the Louis Comfort Tiffany Foundation Grant (2005), the Ruth Chenven Foundation Grant (2001), the Wisconsin Arts Board Fellowship, and the National Endowment for the Arts Grant (2001).

== Works ==
According to Lipman, her work explores several themes, including materiality, mortality, temporality, consumerism, and critical issues that stem from the still life tradition in the 17th century.

- Adeline's Portal, at Moses Myers House of the Chrysler Museum of Art (permanent collection), Virginia, 2013. Components: glass, wood, paint, and adhesive.
- Aspects of (American) Life, at The New Britain Museum of American Art (permanent collection), 2014. Components: glass and adhesive. Response to: Thomas Hart Benton's The Art of Life in America.
- Crib and Cradle, at the John and Marble Ringling Museum of Art, Florida, 2014. Components: glass and adhesive.
- Distill #2, #3, #4, #8, #13, #16, #22; at John Michael Kohler Arts Center and Kohler Co.; 2015. Components: cast iron with rust patina (#2, #4, #16), brass (#3), brass with plating (#22), cast iron/rust/chrome (##8, #13).
- Ephemera, 2013. Pieces to collection: Laid Table with Melons, Figs, Squash, Pomegranates, and Pineapple (at Tory Folliard Gallery); Candlesticks; Puddle and Coins.
- InEarth, at the Smithsonian's National Museum of Natural History, 2017. Components: wood, glass, metal, paint, and adhesive.
- Sideboard with Blue China, at John and Mable Ringling Museum of Art (permanent collection), 2013. Components: wood, glass, adhesive, and paint.
- Secretary with Chipmunk, at Milwaukee Art Museum, 2015. Components: wood, glass, adhesive, ash, gold, brass, mirror, sugar, and salt.
- Overcome, 2016. Components: glass, wood, paint, and adhesive.
- Tropical Landscape Remembered, 2014. Components: glass, wood, metal, adhesive, and paint.
- Double Laid Table, 2016. Components: glass, wood, paint, and adhesive.
- Cut Table, at the Wichita Art Museum, Kansas, 2014. Components: glass, wood, paint and adhesive.
- Laid Table with Etrog Container and Pastry Molds, at the Jewish Museum, New York, 2012. Components: glass, stone, and glue.
- One and Others, at the Norton Museum of Art, Florida, 2011. Components: glass, wood, paint, and adhesive.
