= Ruth Foundation for the Arts =

Philanthropic organization

The Ruth Foundation for the Arts, also known as Ruth Arts, is a non-profit philanthropic arts organization based in Milwaukee, Wisconsin, that supports artists and organizations through grants and invite-only initiatives. Ruth Arts supports organizations throughout the United States while maintaining extra attention and support to the midwest due to Ruth DeYoung Kohler II's lifelong advocacy for the Midwest’s artistic community.

== History ==
The Ruth Foundation for the Arts is funded by a $440 million bequest from Ruth DeYoung Kohler. Karen Patterson, former senior curator at John Michael Kohler Arts Center and director of exhibitions at The Fabric Workshop and Museum, is the Executive Director. The program director of artistic initiatives is Kim Nguyen, former curator and head of programs at the CCA Wattis Institute for Contemporary Arts in San Francisco.

Ruth Arts' initial initiative was to give out individual grants in the range of $10,000 to $50,000.

In 2023, Ruth Arts gave $1.25 million to 56 Arts Organizations that were selected by a group of artists.

In 2024, Ruth Arts awarded $950,000 in grants to 10 Wisconsin arts groups with operating budgets of less than $2 million.

=== Ruth Award ===
In 2024, Ruth Arts established the Ruth Award, giving $100,000 to four artists: Kite, Candice Lin, Joe Minter, and Rose B. Simpson.
