= John Michael Kohler Arts Center =

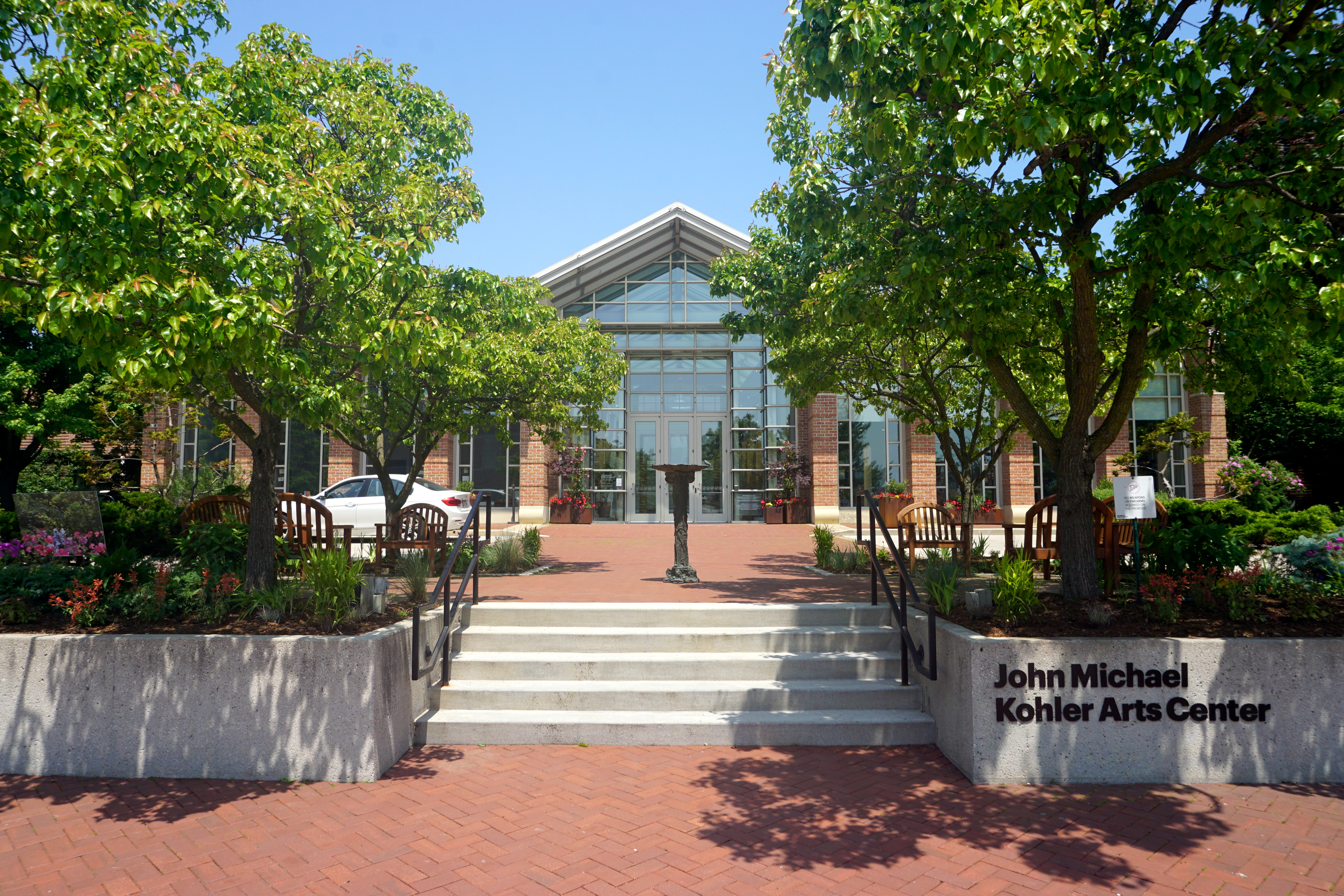
- Established: 1967; 59 years ago
- Location: 608 New York Avenue; Sheboygan, Wisconsin; United States
- Coordinates: 43°45′9″N 87°42′38″W
- Visitors: 160,000/yearly
- Executive director: Amy Horst
- President: Anthony Rammer
- Curator: Jodi Throckmorton
- Public transit access: Shoreline Metro
- Website: www.jmkac.org

The John Michael Kohler Arts Center is an independent, not-for-profit contemporary art museum and performing arts complex located in Sheboygan, Wisconsin, United States. The center preserves and exhibits artist-built environments and contemporary art. In 2021, the center opened the Art Preserve, a satellite museum space dedicated to art environments.

== History ==
The Arts Center was founded in 1967 by the Sheboygan Arts Foundation, Inc., which was renamed as the John Michael Kohler Arts Center, Inc. The Sheboygan Arts Foundation, Inc. was created in 1959, and its first board included Mrs. Walter J. Kohler III. The house that originally comprised the Arts Center, built by John Michael Kohler, is the genesis of the Arts Center's name. It is listed on the National Register of Historic Places as the John Michael Kohler House. The Arts Center also operates the Art Preserve, a museum focused on the presentation and preservation of artist-built environments, which opened in June 2021.

In 1966, the Kohler Foundation donated the Kohler family homestead to the Sheboygan Arts Foundation, Inc. for use as an arts center. The center was established the following year and has been expanded twice to now comprise 100,000 square feet (9,300 m^{2}) including eight galleries, classrooms, studio spaces, two performance spaces, a shop, and a café. The second expansion of the center took place under the leadership of Ruth DeYoung Kohler II, who also founded the Arts/Industry and Connecting Communities programs. 160,000 people visit each year, and an estimated 4 million since its inception. The center curates up to 30 exhibitions per year, and operates the country's first arts-based preschool. The center also has an adjunct shop called ARTspace at the Shops at Woodlake, which is an exhibition space and shop in the nearby village of Kohler. Programming at the center includes art exhibitions, dance performances, festivals, concerts, theatrical performances, classes, demonstrations, lectures, and tours.

In 1997 a program called Connecting Communities began at the center, connecting artists-in-residence to underserved communities and the general public in collaborative projects. The program has created sculptures, dance works, and public art installations through community engagement.

== Art and exhibitions ==
The center is known for its dedication to contemporary and self-taught artists who use commonplace materials, and in particular artists from Wisconsin. The center holds the largest collection of Wisconsin-born artist Eugene Von Bruenchenhein's work in its collection. Bruenchenhein was a prolific self-taught artist who did not receive much recognition until his death in 1983 and the subsequent exhibition of his work at the Arts Center. The museum currently holds over 14,000 pieces by Bruenchenhein, which is the majority of his estate. In 2012 the Mary Nohl Art Environment was gifted to the center, and much of her work at her home in Fox Point was preserved. The environment is one of the few known art environments crafted by a woman artist.

The Arts Center presents originally curated exhibitions that change over the course of the calendar year. They include commissioned works, new works, and contemporary art, with multiple galleries devoted to a common theme. Past exhibitions have featured the work of artists such as Ebony Patterson Lenore Tawney, Ray Yoshida, Emery Blagdon, Nek Chand, Saya Woolfalk, Albert Zahn, Lee Godie, Eddie Owens Martin, Charlie Willeto, Loy Allen Bowlin ("The Original Rhinestone Cowboy"), Dr. Charles Smith, Bill Daniel, Faythe Levine, Bernard Langlais, and Beth Katleman.

== Arts/Industry Residency Program ==
A key component of the John Michael Kohler Arts Center is the Arts/Industry residency program, founded by Ruth DeYoung Kohler II and her brother Herbert in 1974. Artists have the opportunity to spend three months creating works of art utilizing materials and equipment from within the industrial pottery, brass, and iron foundries, and enamel shops of the Kohler Co.'s factory in Kohler, Wisconsin.

The center is internationally recognized for its artist-created public washrooms, designed through the Arts/Industry residency which cultural historian Barbara Penner uses as the introduction to her 2013 book Bathroom. They were designed by Ann Agee, Cynthia Consentino, Carter Kustera, Casey O’Connor, Merrill Mason, and Matt Nolen. Almost 500 artists have participated in the residency program to date. Four additional artist-designed washrooms are included at the Art Preserve of the Arts Center, created by Michelle Grabner, Beth Lipman, and the collaborative team of Joy Feasley and Paul Swenbeck.

== Performing arts ==
The performing arts program began with small concerts, and grew with the inception of the Youth Symphony in 1970. In the summer of 1970, the Arts Center produced the inaugural Summer Theatre season. Artists featured in the center's various performing arts productions have included Bill T. Jones/Arnie Zane Dance Company, Sean Dorsey Dance, John McGivern, Dasha Kelly Hamilton, Esperanza Spalding, Noche Flamenca, Lily Cai Chinese Dance Company, Black Umfolosi and Basso Bongo.

== See also ==
- Art Preserve
