= Loy Allen Bowlin =

- Born: September 16, 1909; Franklin County, Mississippi
- Died: June 14, 1995 (aged 85); McComb, Mississippi
- Education: None
- Known for: Outsider Art
- Notable work: Beautiful Holy Jewel Home of the Original Rhinestone Cowboy
- Awards: Southern Arts Federation/NEA Fellowship for Painting and Works on Paper

Loy Allen Bowlin (September 16, 1909 – June 14, 1995), also known as The Original Rhinestone Cowboy, was an outsider artist from McComb, Mississippi. His artwork largely included bejeweling his clothing, Cadillac, home and even his dentures with thousands of rhinestones. Bowlin's life and work have been acclaimed by various outsider art critics and periodicals including Raw Vision.

After his death, Bowlin's Mississippi home, the Beautiful Holy Jewel Home of the Original Rhinestone Cowboy, was acquired by the Kohler Foundation, Inc. and was moved to the John Michael Kohler Arts Center in Sheboygan, Wisconsin, where it is on permanent display.
