= Worcester Center for Crafts =

Coordinates: 42°16′51.80″N 71°48′27.46″W

The Worcester Center for Crafts, located at 25 Sagamore Road, Worcester, Massachusetts, is one of Worcester's oldest cultural institutions and was one of the first organizations of its kind in the United States. Founded in 1856 by the Worcester Employment Society, the Center provided women with the skills needed to make and sell handcrafts.
