= Emery Blagdon =

American artist

Emery O. Blagdon
- Born: July 25, 1907; Callaway, Nebraska
- Died: June 1, 1986 (aged 78); Callaway, Nebraska
- Resting place: McCain Cemetery, Gandy, Nebraska
- Occupation: Artist

Emery O. Blagdon (July 25, 1907 – June 1, 1986) was an American artist.

== Biography ==
Blagdon was self-taught and did not receive formal art training. From the late 1950s until his death in 1986, Blagdon created a constantly changing installation of paintings and sculptures in a small building on his Nebraska farm. He believed in the power of "earth energies" and in his own ability to channel such forces in a space that, through constant adjusting and aesthetic power, could alleviate pain and illness.

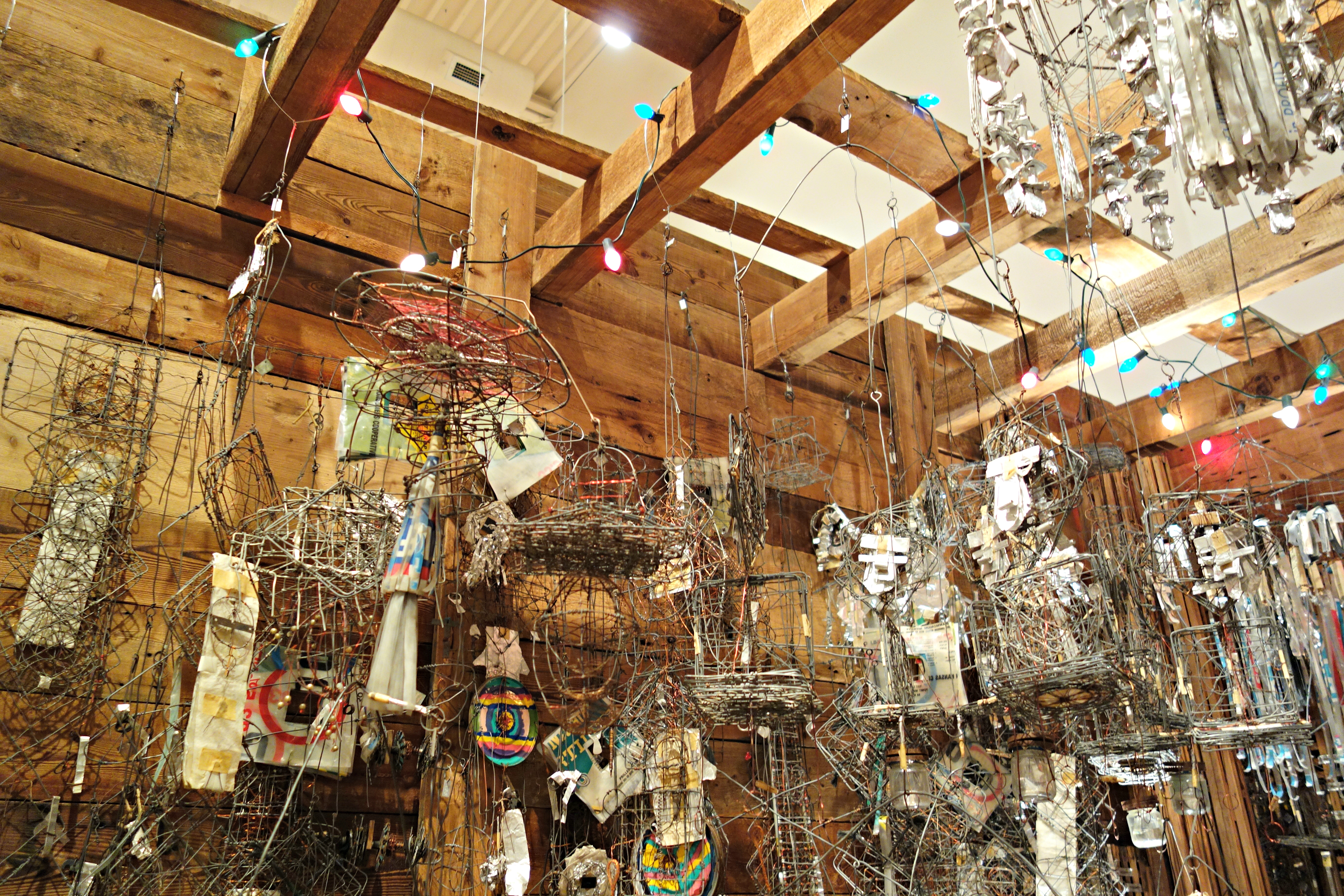
Emery Blagdon's Healing Machine

Blagdon used found materials like hay baling wire, magnets, and remnant paints from farm sales, but he also sought out special ingredients like salts and other "earth elements" through a nearby pharmacy. He called the individual pieces his "pretties," but collectively they composed The Healing Machine. Blagdon worked on his Healing Machine for more than three decades, tending, tinkering with, and reorganizing its components every day and, in his own words, "according to the phases of the moon." He believed it was a functional machine in which energies were drawn upward from the building's earthen floor into the space, where they could bounce around and remain dynamic.

Blagdon died of cancer on June 1, 1986, and was interred at McCain Cemetery. His work has been displayed at the John Michael Kohler Arts Center and the Smithsonian American Art Museum.
