= Intuit Art Museum =

Museum in Chicago, Illinois, US

- Established: June 1991
- Location: Chicago, Illinois, United States
- Coordinates: 41.89546°N 87.65448°W
- Type: Art museum
- Collections: Self taught art, outsider art
- Collection size: 1,300 objects
- CEO: Debra Kerr
- Chairperson: Scott Lang
- Curator: Alison Amick
- Public transit access: CTA Bus routes: Routes 56 and 66 CTA 'L' (Blue line Line): Blue Line Chicago
- Website: www.art.org

Intuit Art Museum, also known as IAM, and formerly known as Intuit: The Center for Intuitive and Outsider Art, is a museum in the West Town neighborhood of Chicago. Founded in 1991, the museum is one of only a few internationally that presents exhibitions and educational programs dedicated to self-taught and outsider art.

== History ==
A group of Chicago art enthusiasts, including Susann Craig, Robert A. Roth, and Marjorie and Harvey Freed, founded Intuit in June 1991. In 1995 the museum gained a physical space in the Roger Brown Home and Studio at 1926 North Halsted Street in the Lincoln Park neighborhood. The museum moved to a larger space in 1999, an 1874 brick building at 756 North Milwaukee Avenue which was formerly the location of the Randolph Street Gallery. An expansion in 2006 provided more exhibition space and the Robert A. Roth Study Center. From 2023–2025, Intuit Art Museum completed a 20-month, $10 million renovation and expansion that tripled its exhibition and programming space.

== Collection ==
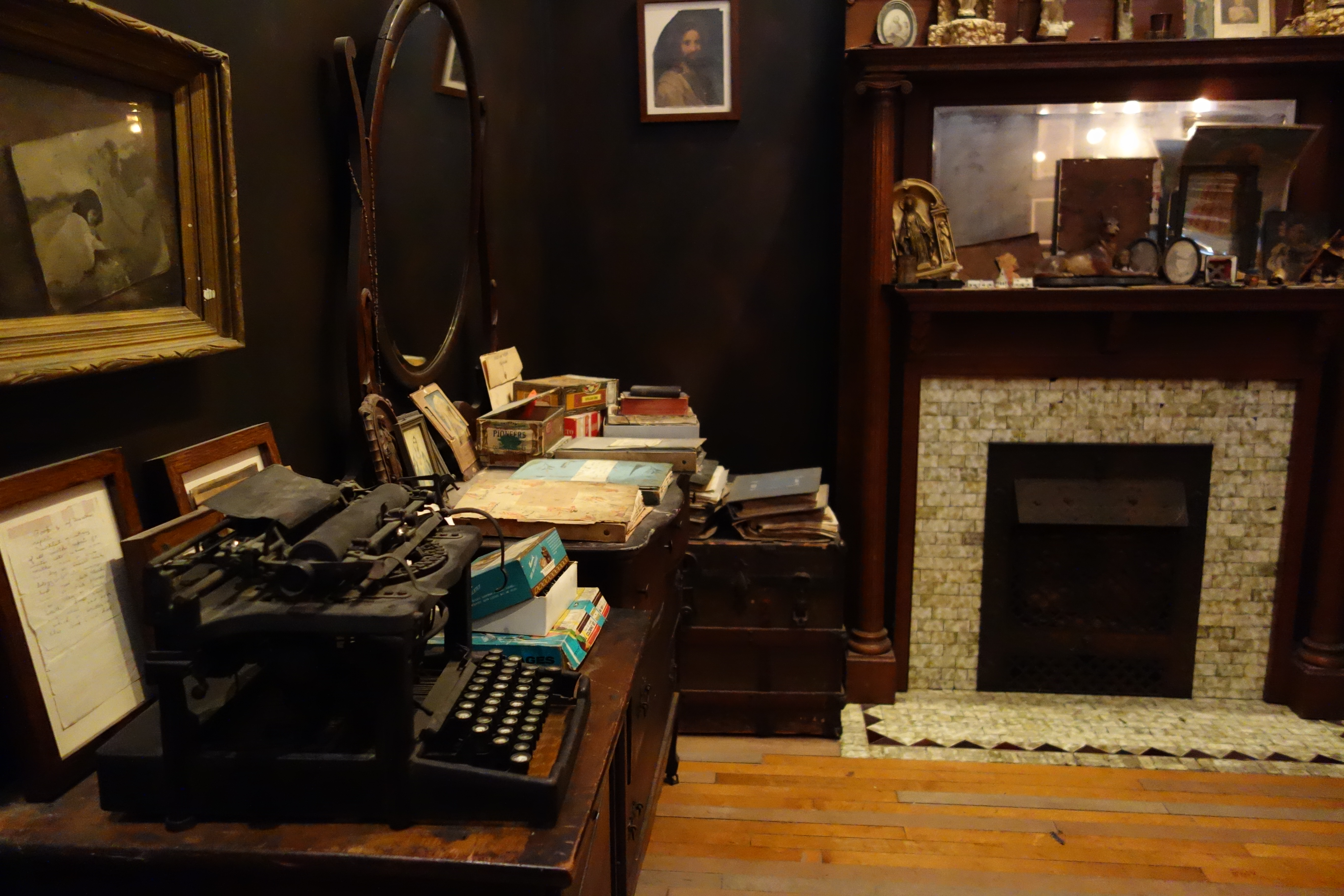
The Henry Darger Room in the Intuit Art Museum, with furnishings from his apartment

Intuit is one of the few museums in the world that exclusively shows self-taught and outsider art. The permanent collection includes artists such as William Hawkins, William Dawson, Minnie Evans, Howard Finster, Wesley Willis, Lee Godie, Mr. Imagination, and Joseph Yoakum. Like many outsider artists, the artists represented in Intuit's collections have often faced significant life challenges, such as mental illness or institutionalization.

The museum took ownership of the contents of Henry Darger's apartment in 2000, and in 2008 opened a permanent exhibit recreating the artist's living and working space. The most recent renovation of the museum included refurbishing this exhibit, now on a below-ground level.

In February of 2026, the museum announced the addition of 61 works, from two collectors, Gordon W. Bailey of Los Angeles and the late Jan Petry, who had been a long-time supporter of the museum.

== Programming ==
Intuit has created multiple social outreach programs, coordinating with schools, libraries, and other organizations to promote arts in education. IntuiTeens is an annual summer program where teenagers collaborate with teen mentors, professional artists, and community organizations to develop their art skills. The Teacher Fellowship Program provides teachers at Chicago Public Schools with the skills to introduce their students to non-traditional materials and methods. Intuit programs have also included workshops for people with dementia, low vision and blindness, and developmental disabilities.

The museum has also hosted an Intuit Show of Folk and Outsider Art and publishes an annual magazine, The Outsider.

== See also ==
- List of museums and cultural institutions in Chicago
- Visual arts of Chicago
