= Eugene Von Bruenchenhein =

American self-taught artist

- Born: July 31, 1910; Marinette, Wisconsin
- Died: January 24, 1983 (aged 72); Milwaukee, Wisconsin
- Resting place: Mount Olivet Cemetery, Milwaukee, Wisconsin
- Style: Self-taught art
- Website: www.vonbruenchenhein.com

Eugene Von Bruenchenhein (July 31, 1910 – January 24, 1983) was an American self-taught artist from Milwaukee, Wisconsin. Over the course of fifty years, he produced an expansive oeuvre of poetry, photography, painting, drawing, and sculpture.

== Early life ==
Edward Eugene Von Bruenchenhein was born on July 31, 1910, in Marinette, Wisconsin. The second of three sons, Eugene was only seven years old when his mother, Clara Von Bruenchenhein died. Soon after his father, Edward, married Elizabeth “Bessie” Mosley, a schoolteacher. A woman of literary and artistic ambitions, Bessie “became a model of creativity and intellectual exploration for the young Eugene.”

After graduating high school, Eugene worked for a florist and cultivated a growing collection of exotic plants and cacti at his father's home. His passion for horticulture would later be visible in his repeated use of floral motifs and leaf patterns.

In 1939, he met Evelyn Kalka (1920–1989), who would become his wife and muse. In 1943, they married and Evelyn came to be known as “Marie,” a name she took on in honor of one of Eugene’s favorite aunts. While Von Bruenchenhein worked at a bakery, he and Marie moved into his father’s former storefront at 514 South 94th Place. It was here that Eugene and Marie established an “all-encompassing” world of their own – a world where stages of exotic theaters were mounted, where everyday items fueled his creativity. For the next forty years, Von Bruenchenhein not only made his home the site of his artistic production, but also an integral part of his creative process. After his death, it stood as “a patchwork of pastel colors and applied architectural ornament,” which was “guarded by mask-like concrete monuments within lilac bushes on the periphery.”

== Photography ==
Von Bruenchenhein began his prolific career as an amateur photographer. In the early 1940s, after setting up a darkroom in his bathroom, he started to photograph his wife, Marie, at home. Nevertheless, his photographs extended past the walls of their bedroom. Using leftover materials as backdrops and props, Von Bruenchenhein created transformative stages for Marie to pose on; he invited her to dress up in exotic costumes. Many of these portraits evoke the "pin up" art popular in the 1940s and 50s. As the main object of attraction, Marie coyly confronts the viewer to question the relationship between photographer and subject, husband and wife, artist and muse. By the mid 1950s, these intimate shots had reached the thousands.

== Paintings ==
In 1954 Von Bruenchenhein shifted his focus from photography to painting. Restrained by a limited budget, Von Bruenchenhein displayed remarkable thrift in the development of his skills and the production of his paintings. Notably, he often painted “at his kitchen table on Masonite or discarded cardboard-box panels salvaged from the bakery.”

From 1954 to 1963, Von Bruenchenhein created around 950 paintings. Each successive painting provided an opportunity to further develop his painting skills. Notably, 1954 marked a major moment: he began to paint with his fingers. Carefully manipulating oil paint with his fingers and tools, like sticks, leaves, combs, cardboard, burlap, tar paper, and crumpled paper, Von Bruenchenhein established his own distinct process.

His paintings from this period investigated the power of nuclear energy. Within his canvases, Von Bruenchenhein created fantastical scenes of exploding bursts. His imaginative lexicon came to include “underwater flora and fauna, bulging-eyed beasts and serpents, and fantasy architecture.”

From the mid-1960s to late 1970s, Von Bruenchenhein turned away from painting and dedicated his time to sculpture. Nevertheless, in the late 1970s, he returned to the medium. This time, however, his paintings were informed by the decade he spent constructing architectural bone sculptures. His later paintings offer up vast open scenes of architectural towers and clouded skies.

== Sculptures ==
=== Ceramics ===
From the late 1960s to the early 1980, Von Bruenchenhein dedicated himself to developing his craft as a skilled manipulator of clay. After locating a few clay deposits from nearby construction sites, he began a series of sculpted “foliate forms,” ranging from delicate pink blossoms to leafy greens. These forms soon began to take on a more sophisticated structure. Leaf pots soon evolved into a collection of more complex “foliate vessels.” Vase-like forms evolved from conjoined florets.

His ceramic collection also reveals a shift in focus from more realist botanical shapes to more imaginative constructions. Crowns and headdresses began to appear. Von Bruenchenhein’s regard for royal regalia points to his belief that his family “was descended from royalty from the German region of Lower Saxony.” Revealingly, in one self-portrait, he offered the words “Edward the First, Kind of Lesser Lands + Tie Cannot Touch” as a self-proclaimed caption.

=== Bone sculptures ===
During the late 1960s and early 1970s, Von Bruenchenhein continued exploring architectural forms and symbols of royalty in his enigmatic bone sculptures. Once again displaying remarkable ingenuity, he found purpose and function in the discarded – in leftover chicken and turkey bones. Architecturally imposing bone structures resulted.

After soaking the bones in ammonia and drying them on his stove, Von Bruenchenhein would glue them together to create towers and miniature thrones. In their color and stature, these structures suggested regal grandeur. Some towers reached five feet in height. He lacquered his chair sculptures in gold and metallic hues. As a collection, the sculptures highlight Von Bruenchenhein's skillful ability to create elegant “lacelike” forms out of webs of bones and glue.

== Drawings ==
Despite being his least well-known medium, drawing holds a significant position in Von Bruenchenhein’s collection. It connects two seemingly disparate studies of his work: his floral constructions and his architectural structures. From 1964 to 1966, Von Bruenchenhein used small swatches of wallpaper as his canvas for ink drawings. Seemingly “products of an open-ended, generative experimentation,” the drawings include expanding spirals, zig-zagging scaffolds, and exploding diamonds.

== Legacy ==
Now a prominent figure in the world of “self-taught” art, Von Bruenchenhein remained anonymous to the larger artistic community for the duration of his career. Remarkably, he produced thousands of pieces of art within the confines of his home-turned-studio. During his lifetime, only close friends and family knew of their existence. Although Von Bruenchenhein's pieces remained out of sight, it is not for want of trying. In an effort to sell and exhibit his work, Von Bruenchenhein repeatedly approached local galleries, but to no avail. It was only after his death on January 24, 1983, that Daniel Nycz, a close friend and supporter, got the attention of Russell Bowman, the director of the Milwaukee Art Museum. In September 1983, the John Michael Kohler Arts Center in Sheboygan, Wisconsin, began cataloguing the entire collection.

== Exhibitions ==
In 1984, the Kohler center launched its first ever exhibit of Von Bruenchenhein's work. Now, Von Bruenchenhein's work is garnering newfound attention. Notably, in 2010 Von Bruenchenhein’s work received “its first in-depth museum exhibition” at the American Folk Art Museum. The exhibit, entitled "Eugene Von Bruenchenhein: Freelance Artist—Poet and Sculptor—Inovator—Arrow maker and Plant man—Bone artifacts constructor—Photographer and Architect—Philosopher” displayed over 125 of Von Bruenchenhein’s photographs, sculptures, paintings, and drawings. Brett Littman, the executive director of the Drawing Center in SoHo, was the guest curator.

=== 2014 ===
- "Eugene Von Bruenchenhein: Bits From the First World", Maccarone (New York, New York), February 15 - March 29, 2014
- “Folk Couture: Fashion and Folk Art”, American Folk Art Museum (New York, New York), January 21- April 23, 2014
- “Uncommon Folk: Traditions in American Art.”, Milkwaukee Art Museum, (Milkwaukee, Wisconsin,) January 31, 201 - May 4, 2014.

=== 2013 ===
- "Alternative Guide To The Universe," Hayward Gallery (London, England), June 11 - August 26, 2013
- 55th International Art Exhibition, Venice Biennale, Giardini and at the Arsenale (Venice, Italy), June 1 - November 24, 2013
- “Great and Mighty Things: Outsider Art from the Jill and Sheldon Bonovitz Collection.”, Philadelphia Museum of Art (Philadelphia, Pennsylvania), March 3 - June 9, 2013
- “Women’s Studies.”, American Folk Art Museum (New York, NY), January 24 - May 26, 2013

=== 2011-2012 ===
- "Eugene Von Bruenchenhein: From the Wand of the Genii," Intuit Art Museum (Chicago, Illinois), September 16, 2011 - January 14, 2012
- Inova/Kenilworth, a gallery of the University of Wisconsin-Milwaukee (Milwaukee, Wisconsin), February 3 - April 7, 2012

=== 2010-2011 ===
- "Out of This World: A Centennial Celebration of Eugene Von Bruenchenhein," American Visionary Art Museum, (Baltimore, Maryland) March 2, 2010- March 2, 2012
- "Wild Kingdom" (group show), John Michael Kohler Arts Center, (Sheboygan, Wisconsin)

=== 2010 ===
- "Eugene Von Bruenchenhein: 'Freelance Artist - Poet and Sculptor - Inovator - Arrow maker and Plant man - Bone artifacts constructor - Photographer and Architect - Philosopher'," American Folk Art Museum, (New York, NY) November 4, 2010 - July 8, 2011
- "Eugene Von Bruenchenhein," Cavin-Morris Gallery, (New York, NY), October 21 - December 4, 2010
- "Eugene Von Bruenchenhein," The Douglas Hyde Gallery, (New York, NY), July 15 - September 14, 2010

=== 2009-2010 ===
- "Approaching Abstraction" (group show), American Folk Art Museum, (New York, NY)

=== 2004-2009 ===
- "American Masterpieces" (group show), John Michael Kohler Arts Center, (Sheboygan, Wisconsin)
- "After Nature" (group show), New Museum (New York, NY), July 17 - September 21, 2008
- "Eugene Von Bruenchenhein," Feigen Contemporary, (New York, NY), January 12 - March 10, 2007
- "Subject: Contemporary Portraiture" (group how), Lyman Allyn Art Museum, New London
- "The Ceramic Art of Eugene Von Bruenchenhein," John Michael Kohler Arts Center, (Sheboygan, Wisconsin)
- "Self and Subject" (group show), American Folk Art Museum, (New York, NY)
- "Folk Art Revealed" (group show), American Folk Art Museum, (New York, NY) --> until 2009
- "Create and Be Recognized: Photography on the Edge" (group show), Yerba Buena Center for Arts, (San Francisco, CA), and the George Eastman House, International Museum of Photography and Film, (Rochester, NY)
- "Eugene Von Bruenchenhein," Feigen Contemporary, (New York, NY), September 10 - October 23, 2004
- "Genesis: Gifts and Promised Gifts to the Permanent Collection" (group show), Intuit: The Center for Intuitive and Outsider Art, (Chicago, Illinois)

Von Bruenchenhein's work is represented in various museum's collections, including: American Folk Art Museum, New York; High Museum of Art, Atlanta; Museum of Fine Arts, Houston; John Michael Kohler Arts Center, (Sheboygan, Wisconsin); Milwaukee Art Museum; New Orleans Museum of Art; Intuit: The Center for Intuitive and Outsider Art, Chicago; Newark Museum; Philadelphia Museum of Art; and the Smithsonian American Art Museum, Washington, D.C.

== Bibliography ==
- Andrew Edlin Gallery. Eugene Von Bruenchenhein: King of Lesser Lands. New York: Andrew Edlin Gallery, 2016.
- Carl Hammer Gallery. Eugene Von Bruenchenhein, 1910-1983. Chicago: Carl Hammer Gallery, 1990.
- Cubbs, Joanne. Ceramic Sculptures: Eugene Von Bruenchenhein. Philadelphia: Fleisher/Ollman Gallery, 1998.
- Cubbs, Joanne. Eugene Von Bruenchenhein: Obsessive Visionary. Sheboygan, Wisconsin: Milwaukee Art Museum, 1988.
- Hollander, Stacy C. and Brooke Davis Anderson. American Anthem: Masterworks from the American Folk Art Museum. New York: Harry N. Abrams, Inc., Publishers, 2001, 229-232.
- Littman, Brett, with a preface by Maria Ann Conelli. "Eugene Von Bruenchenhein: Freelance Artist—Poet and Sculptor—Inovator—Arrow maker and Plant man—Bone artifacts constructor—Photographer and Architect—Philosopher.” New York: American Folk Art Museum, 2011.
- Stone, Lisa. "Thoughts on the Art of Eugene Von Bruenchenhein" Folk Art, Fall 2007: 82-90.
- Swislow, Williams. "Three Outsider Photographers: Lee Godie, Eugene Von Bruenchenhein and Morton Bartlett" Folk Art Messenger, Winter 2002, 28-31.
- Umberger, Leslie. Sublime Spaces & Visionary Worlds: Built Environments by Vernacular Artists, New York: Princeton Architectural Press in association with John Michael Kohler Arts Center, 2007.
- Wertkin, Gerard C., ed. Encyclopedia of American Folk Art. New York: Routledge, 2004.
