= Mary Nohl Art Environment =

- Mary L. Nohl Art Environment
- U.S. National Register of Historic Places
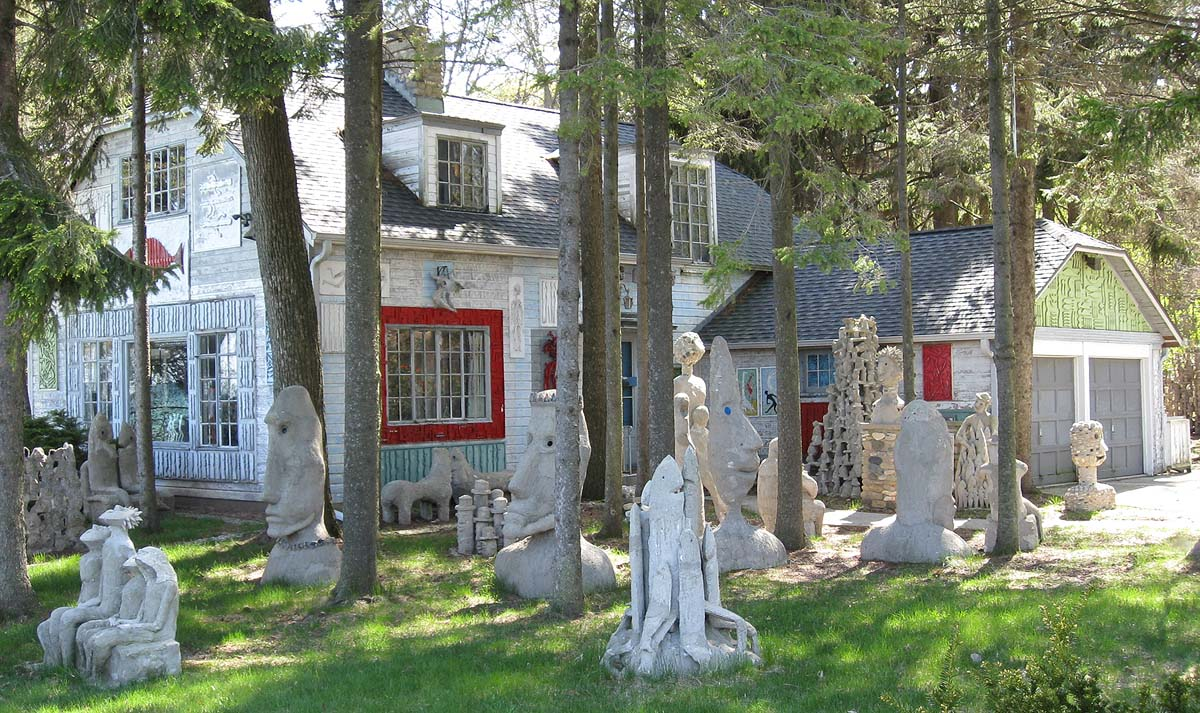
- Location: 7328 N. Beach Rd. Fox Point, Wisconsin
- Coordinates: 43°9′1″N 87°53′31″W
- NRHP reference No.: 05001109
- Added to NRHP: October 3, 2005

Mary Nohl's Artistic Talents

The Mary Nohl Art Environment (also called the Fox Point Art Yard, Fox Point Witch's house and Mary Nohl's house) is a residence in the Milwaukee suburb of Fox Point, Wisconsin. The property, which is filled with folk art created by artist Mary Nohl (1914–2001), is listed on the National Register of Historic Places.

Mary's father Leo, a Milwaukee attorney, and his wife Emma bought the lot along Lake Michigan in 1924, and the family enjoyed summers there in a prefab cottage through the 1920s. In 1940 the parents expanded the cottage into a year-round home, adding the house between the cottage and the garage. Shortly after, Mary moved back to Milwaukee and moved into the house with her parents. After a couple years of teaching art in Milwaukee she resigned, and settled in to producing art at her pottery studio in Whitefish Bay, and at her jewelry studio in her parents' home.

After the death of her parents, a sizable inheritance left Mary Nohl the chance to create artworks. She used concrete and found objects such as driftwood, wire and glass to build sculptures. In addition, the exterior and interior of the house are colorfully decorated. Hundreds of works have been cataloged.

Following Nohl's death, the embellished home and sculpture garden were given to the Kohler Foundation for preservation. In 2012, it was transferred to the John Michael Kohler Arts Center. After a fruitless, decade-long struggle with the residents of Fox Point to allow limited access by the public, the foundation decided to move the house and its art to a site in Sheboygan County. The house was to be dismantled, starting in the summer of 2014, and rebuilt, at a cost of between one and two million dollars, but the plan was eventually canceled. As of April 2015, the house will remain in Fox Point and is expected to be restored.

In addition to her home and artwork, her estate of over $11 million was left to the Greater Milwaukee Foundation, which administers the Mary Nohl Foundation to provide arts education for children, and the Mary Nohl Fellowship artists' scholarships among other activities. A biography, Mary Nohl - Inside & Outside, written and designed by Barbara Manger and Janine Smith, respectively, was published in 2008.
