= Wisconsin Concrete Park =

- U.S. National Register of Historic Places
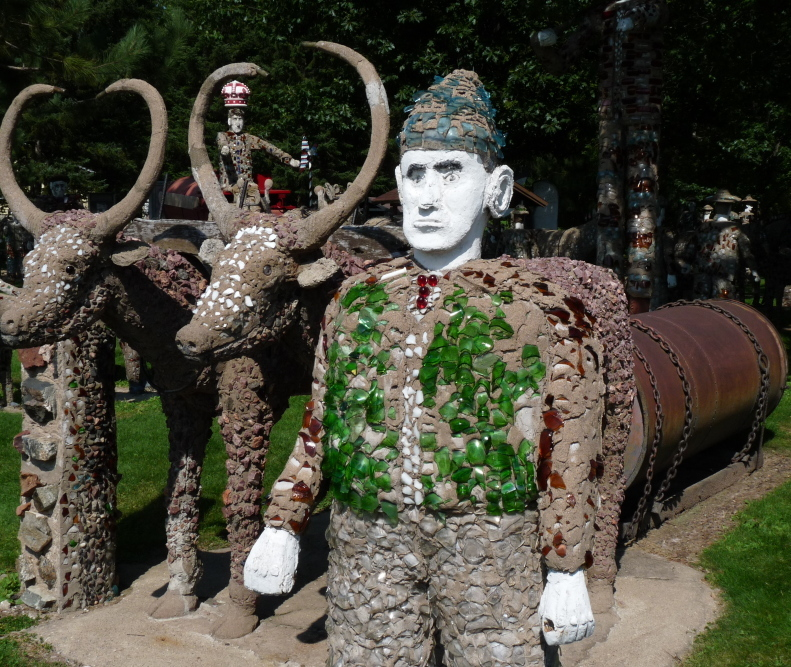
- "Mr. Knox and Oxen", a sculpture in the park

- Location within Wisconsin Location within the United States
- Location: WI 13 S., Phillips, Wisconsin
- Coordinates: 45°40′15″N 90°23′19″W
- Area: 18 acres (7.3 ha)
- Built: 1948
- Architect: Smith, Fred
- Architectural style: Late 19th And Early 20th Century American Movements
- NRHP reference No.: 05001195
- Added to NRHP: October 28, 2005

The Wisconsin Concrete Park is a sculpture park located along Wisconsin Highway 13 in the town of Phillips, Wisconsin, United States. The park includes over 200 folk art sculptures built with concrete and decorated with glass bottles and other found objects. Fred Smith, who ran the Rock Garden Tavern on the property, began building the sculptures in 1948 after retiring from his career as a lumberjack. Smith, who lacked any formal artistic education, initially built two-dimensional bas relief plaques and eventually transitioned to constructing his larger sculptures. Smith continued building sculptures until 1964, when a stroke forced him to stop working. Smith claimed that the sculptures "came to [him] naturally" and that "nobody knows why I made these sculptures, even me."

The sculptures primarily feature people engaging in everyday activities, such as farming, watching workers, and drinking beer. Animals are also frequently depicted, both in the wild and helping with farm work. One sculpture, the last Smith completed before his stroke, features a team of Clydesdales pulling a Budweiser wagon. Historical and legendary figures such as Ben-Hur, Paul Bunyan, and Abraham Lincoln are also depicted.

Smith was born in 1886 in Price County (the same county as his park) to German immigrants. Beginning in his early teens, he worked as a lumberjack. In 1903 he homesteaded the property where the concrete park stands today. In addition to woods-work, Fred raised ginseng and Christmas trees on his farm. When his first house burned in 1921, he had the current house built. The house is fairly standard Craftsman style, except for the "rock garden room," in which Smith constructed a 23-foot brick trough with running water, a mica-flecked fish pond, crosscut saw blades, and a rock garden. Some time between 1922 and the 1940s he added a rock garden outside, with raised beds in various shapes. In 1936, he and local stonemasons Albert and John Raskie built the Rock Garden Tavern, where he entertained visitors with tall tales and musical performances where he jumped from table to table with bells on his legs, playing a mandolin or fiddle. He began creating the concrete sculptures after retiring in 1948, and gradually transformed the outdoor rock garden into the concrete park, until his stroke in 1964.

After Smith's death in 1976, a storm damaged over 70% of the figures. The Kohler Foundation rehabilitated the park and donated it to Price County, and the land is now a county park. The restoration was carried out by sculptors Don Howlett and Sharron Quasius. The park was added to the National Register of Historic Places on October 28, 2005.
