= Joseph Yoakum =

American outsider artist (1891–1972)

- Born: Joseph Elmer Yoakum c. February 22, 1891; Ash Grove, Missouri, U.S.
- Died: December 25, 1972 (aged 81); Rock Island, Rock Island County, Illinois, U.S.
- Education: Self-taught
- Known for: Illustration, drawing
- Movement: Outsider art
- Patrons: John Hopgood, Whitney Halstead, Ray Yoshida

Joseph Elmer Yoakum (c. February 22, 1891 – December 25, 1972) was an American self-taught painter. He was of African-American and possibly of Native American–descent, and was known for his landscape paintings in the outsider art-style. He was age 76 when he started to record his memories in the form of imaginary landscapes and produced over 2,000 drawings during the last decade of his life.

== Early life ==
Joseph Elmer Yoakum's biographical information is difficult to verify but he also claimed to be of African, French, and Cherokee descent. New York Times critic Will Heinrich called his biography "tricky...It’s poorly documented, and the artist himself was not a reliable narrator." His birthdates have also been given as 1886, 1888, and 1891, and his Veteran's Administration record says he was born in Springfield, Missouri. A 9 year old Joe Yoakum does show up in the 1900 U.S. census in Greene County, Missouri, listed as Black with his father's birthplace being listed as Indian Territory. His father John Yoakum is listed in the 1880 census as Black with his birthplace listed as Cherokee Nation.

Yoakum was born in Ash Grove, Missouri, but told a story of being born in Arizona, in 1888, as a Navajo Indian on the Window Rock Navajo reservation. Taking pride in his exaggerated Native heritage, Yoakum would pronounce "Navajo" as "Na-va-JOE" (as in "Joseph"). He spent his early childhood on a Missouri farm.

Yoakum left home when he was nine years old to join the Great Wallace Circus. As a bill poster, he also traveled across the U.S. with Buffalo Bill's Wild West Show and the Ringling Brothers, among the five different circuses. He later traveled to Europe as a stowaway.

In 1908, he returned to Missouri and started a family with his girlfriend Myrtle Julian, with whom he had his first son in 1909; the couple married in 1910. Around 1916, he worked in a coal mine, Hale Coal and Mining to support his family. Yoakum was drafted into the United States Army in 1918 and worked in the 805th Pioneer Infantry repairing roads and railroads. After the war, he traveled around the United States, working odd jobs, but never returned to his family. He later remarried and moved to Chicago. In 1946, Yoakum was committed to a psychiatric hospital there. He soon left and by the early 1950s he was drawing on a regular basis.

== Artistic work ==
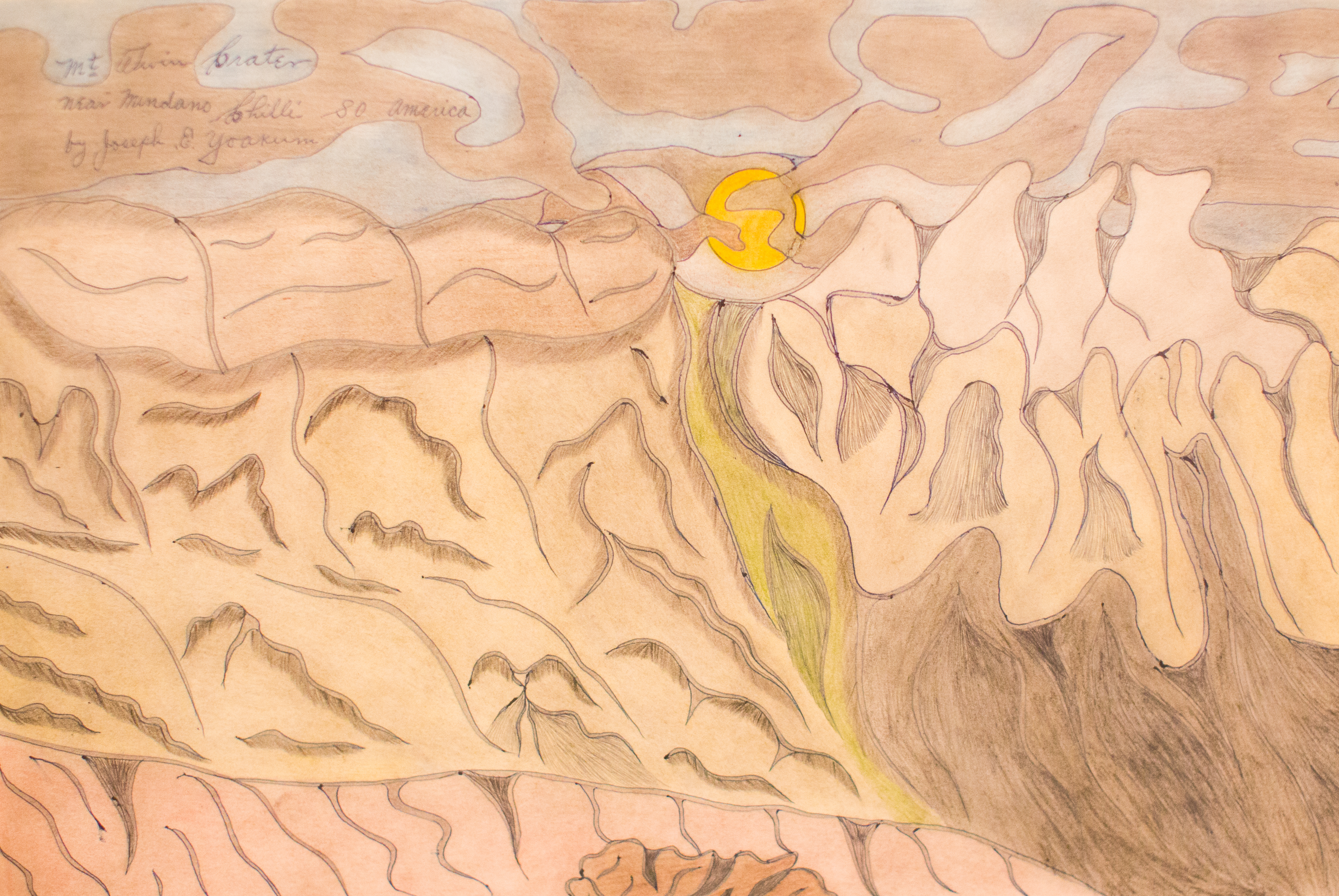
One of Yoakum's drawings

Yoakum was again living and painting in Chicago by 1962. Tom Brand, owner of Galaxy Press on the south side of Chicago, in 1968 had some printing to deliver to a coffee shop called "The Whole". While there he noticed the colored pencil drawings of Yoakum and was immediately taken by them. Brand had an account with the Ed Sherbyn Gallery on the north side of Chicago, and he persuaded Sherbyn to exhibit Yoakum's works and even printed his own poster for this show. Norman Mark of The Chicago Daily News wrote an article about Yoakum called "My drawings are a spiritual unfoldment"; this article was printed on the back of the poster. Brand informed his artist friends (including Whitney Halstead) about Yoakum and encouraged them to visit "The Whole" coffee shop. Halstead, an artist and instructor at the School of the Art Institute of Chicago, became the greatest promoter of Yoakum's work during his lifetime. He believed that his story was "more invention than reality... in part myth, Yoakum's life as he would have wished to have lived it."

In 1967, Yoakum was discovered by the mainstream art community through John Hopgood, an instructor at the Chicago State College, who saw Yoakum's work hanging in his studio window and purchased twenty-two pictures. A group of students including Roger Brown, Gladys Nilsson, Jim Nutt, and Barbara Rossi, and teachers at the School of the Art Institute of Chicago, including Ray Yoshida and Whitney Halstead, took an interest in promoting his work. In 1972, just one month before his death, Yoakum was given a one-man show at the Whitney Museum in New York City.

He started drawing familiar places, such as Green Valley Ashville Kentucky, as a method to capture his memories. However, he shifted towards imaginary landscapes in places he had never visited, like Mt Cloubelle of West India or Mt Mowbullan in Dividing Range near Brisbane Australia. Drawing outlines with ballpoint pen, rarely making corrections, he colored his drawings within the lines using watercolors and pastels. He became known for his organic forms, always using two lines to designate land masses.

During the final four months of his life Yoakum's work was marked by a use of pure abstraction, as in his illustration Flooding of Sock River through Ash Grove Mo [Missouri] on July 4, 1914 in that [waters] drove many persons from Homes I were with the Groupe leiving [sic] their homes for safety. That painting was one of his autobiographical works.

In 2018–19 Yoakum's work was included in the exhibition Outliers and American Vanguard Art at the National Gallery of Art, High Museum of Art, and Los Angeles County Museum of Art. Following this event, Venus Over Manhattan presented an exhibition featuring more than sixty works on paper, which constituted the largest collection of Yoakum’s art assembled in New York since 1972. In 2021, the Museum of Modern Art presented more than 100 of his works in an exhibition called Joseph E. Yoakum: What I Saw. It was organized by the Art Institute of Chicago, the Museum of Modern Art, and the Menil Drawing Institute, which is part of the Menil Collection. His work is represented in the National Gallery of Art, among other institutions.
