= Lee Godie =

American painter (1908–1994)

- Born: Jamot Emily Godee; September 1, 1908; Chicago, Illinois, U.S.
- Died: March 2, 1994 (aged 85); Plato Center, Illinois
- Known for: Painting, photography
- Movement: Outsider art

Lee Godie (born Jamot Emily Godee; September 1, 1908 – March 2, 1994) was an American self-taught artist who was active in Chicago during the late 1960s until around the early 1990s. She was a prolific artist who was known for her paintings and modified photos which are shown in galleries and museums such as the Hayward Gallery in London and the Smithsonian American Art Museum. Some consider her Chicago's most collected artist.

== Life ==
Godie was born in Chicago. She and her ten siblings were raised in a Christian Scientist household. Her family lived in a small house on the Northwest side; she slept in the attic with her sisters.

Lee Godie was notoriously wary of divulging personal information about herself. She was married twice and had four children. It was possible that she had once wanted to be a singer, but wasn't allowed by one of her husbands. Following the death of two of her children, her life was transformed and Godie reinvented herself as an artist in Chicago. Godie remained in downtown Chicago for almost a 30-year period, becoming a facet of the social milieu during that time.

Godie lived on the streets, sleeping outdoors or in transient hotels. She could be seen sleeping outdoors in sub-zero temperatures, "on a concrete bench...clutching her large black portfolio case." Living outdoors seemed to be by choice, since she had quite a lot of money saved and did not seem to enjoy being indoors.

Godie had a unique fashion style and could be seen wearing different swatches of fabric wrapped around herself or fur coats that were pieced together. She also used her paint to transform her appearance, painting "big orange circles over each cheek" and painted-on eyeshadow.

An article about Godie in the Wall Street Journal alerted one of her daughters, Bonnie Blank, to where she was living. Blank had not seen her mother since she was 3 years old. When Godie met her daughter, she insisted that Blank have art lessons, which she herself provided. In 1991, Blank was granted legal guardianship of her mother, who was suffering from dementia, and she moved her to a nursing home near Plato Center, Illinois.

== Work ==
Beginning in 1968, Godie could be seen on the steps of the Art Institute of Chicago, selling her art to passersby. She later moved to a location on the North Side of Chicago after a disagreement with a curator.

Godie was a self-styled French Impressionist and believed her work to be as significant as Paul Cézanne's. She was particular about whom she sold her art to and even to whom she spoke, preferring to interact with "artists". She would only sell or reveal her work to those she liked and she incorporated performance, such as song and dance, into the process of selling and making her art. The transaction of buying her art from Godie was considered "part of the magic, even part of the art itself".

Godie's paintings were created in a variety of mediums which included watercolor, pencil, tempera, ballpoint pen, and crayon and on a number of surfaces such as canvas, poster board, sheets of paper and discarded window blinds. Some of her works were several pieces stitched together in the fashion of a triptych or book. Godie most often painted female busts, which she felt were "an expression of beauty". Her portraits were often personal: she drew herself, friends, passersby and famous individuals. She also created "archetypal characters... part cultural icon, part personal symbolism". Artist and design editor at the Chicago Tribune, David Syrek says, "Lee's painting have an intensity that is not found in a great deal of outsider art." Art critic, Dennis Adrian called her work bold and strong.

Also included in the array of art works Godie created are the black-and-white snapshots from photo booths she took of herself dressed up in different personae. Godie started working on these in the 1970s. She would take these photos and embellish certain parts of them, adding color to her lips or nails or painting on darker eyebrows. Her photographs are often considered her most "highly regarded, inventive work". She would dress differently for each photo and add color, words or erase parts of the photos. Of her photographs, Ralph Rugoff, director of the Hayward Gallery in London, says: "These images are very powerful on a number of levels. They’re as gripping as works by any trained photographer."

Many exhibitions have featured Godie's work. Between November 13, 1993, and January 16, 1994, an exhibition entitled "Artist Lee Godie: A Twenty-Year Retrospective", curated by Michael Bonesteel, who wrote the "Lee Godie" article in Raw Vision magazine, was presented at the Chicago Cultural Center. From September 12, 2008, to January 3, 2009, an exhibition of over 100 pieces of Lee Godie's work entitled "Finding Beauty: The Art of Lee Godie" was on exhibit at Intuit: The Center for Intuitive and Outsider Art. Her work can be found in the permanent collections of the Museum of American Folk Art in New York City, the Milwaukee Art Museum, the Arkansas Arts Center, the Smithsonian American Art Museum, and the Museum of Contemporary Art in Chicago.

== Chicago Proclamation ==
In 1991, Chicago's Mayor Daley proclaimed September "Lee Godie Exhibition Month". The proclamation in part reads:

Now, Therefore, I, Richard M. Daley, Mayor of the City of Chicago, do hereby proclaim September 6-October 8, 1991 to be Lee Godie Exhibition Month in Chicago and urge all citizens to pay homage to a gifted artist.
