= Madeleine Lommel =

French artist

- Born: 1923; France
- Died: 2009 (aged 85–86)
- Known for: Founding l'Aracine Association of Art
- Movement: Art Brut

Madeleine Lommel (1923-2009) was a French outsider artist and founder of the first outsider artist museum in Paris, l'Aracine which became the Musée d'Art Brut. She was a prominent supporter of outsider art in France.

== Early life and education ==
Madelein Lommel was born in France in 1923. She was a painter focused on the Art Brut style. Upon encountering the work of Jean Dubuffet in Paris in 1969, Lommel decided to dedicate her life to art brut.

Although an active artist and promoter of Art Brut during her time, not much is known or documented about her early life or education. This pattern can be seen in American art historian Linda Nochlin's 1971 essay “Why Are There No Great Women Artists?”; that seminal feminist text detailed how, for generations, institutional attitudes and obstacles had prevented deserving female art-makers from being recognized in Western art history's canon.

== The Founding of l'Aracine Association ==
In 1982, Lommel along with two other artists Claire Teller and Michel Nedjar decided to bring together their major works in an exhibition titled “Les Jardins Barbares” (The Barbarian Gardens) which was housed in Château Guérin in Neuilley sur Marne. The exhibition was the beginning of l'Aracine, a Franco-Belgian artist's association focused on outsider art, otherwise known as art brut.

In 1986, l'Aracine was granted museum status in France and was financially supported by the Ministry of Culture. In 1996, upon loss of its government funding, Lommel, as President of the association, initiated the donation of the entirety of the museum's collection to the Community of Lille Métropole. The collection was later added to Lille Museum of Modern Art making it the largest public art collection in France. Lommel remained a board member of the museum until 2009.

Other notable artists included in the Aracine collection include:

André Robillard, Aloïse Corbaz, Henry Drager, Magde Gill, Augustin Lesage, Adolf Wölfli, Carlo Zinelli, Fleury Joseph Crepin, Judith Scott, Emile Ratier, Théo Wiesen, Jean Smilowski, Michel Nedjar.

== Renewed interest ==
in 2019, Lommel was one of several women artists featured in an exhibition titled Flying High: Women Artists of Art Brut, held in Vienna at Bank Austria Kunstforum Wien. The exhibition included an international survey of over 300 works by 93 under-recognized female self-taught artists and was curated by Kunstforum Wien's director, Ingried Brugger, and Hannah Rieger.
