= Lille Métropole Museum of Modern, Contemporary and Outsider Art =

Art Museum in Villeneuve d'Ascq, France

Coordinates: 50°38′16″N 3°08′53″E

LaM
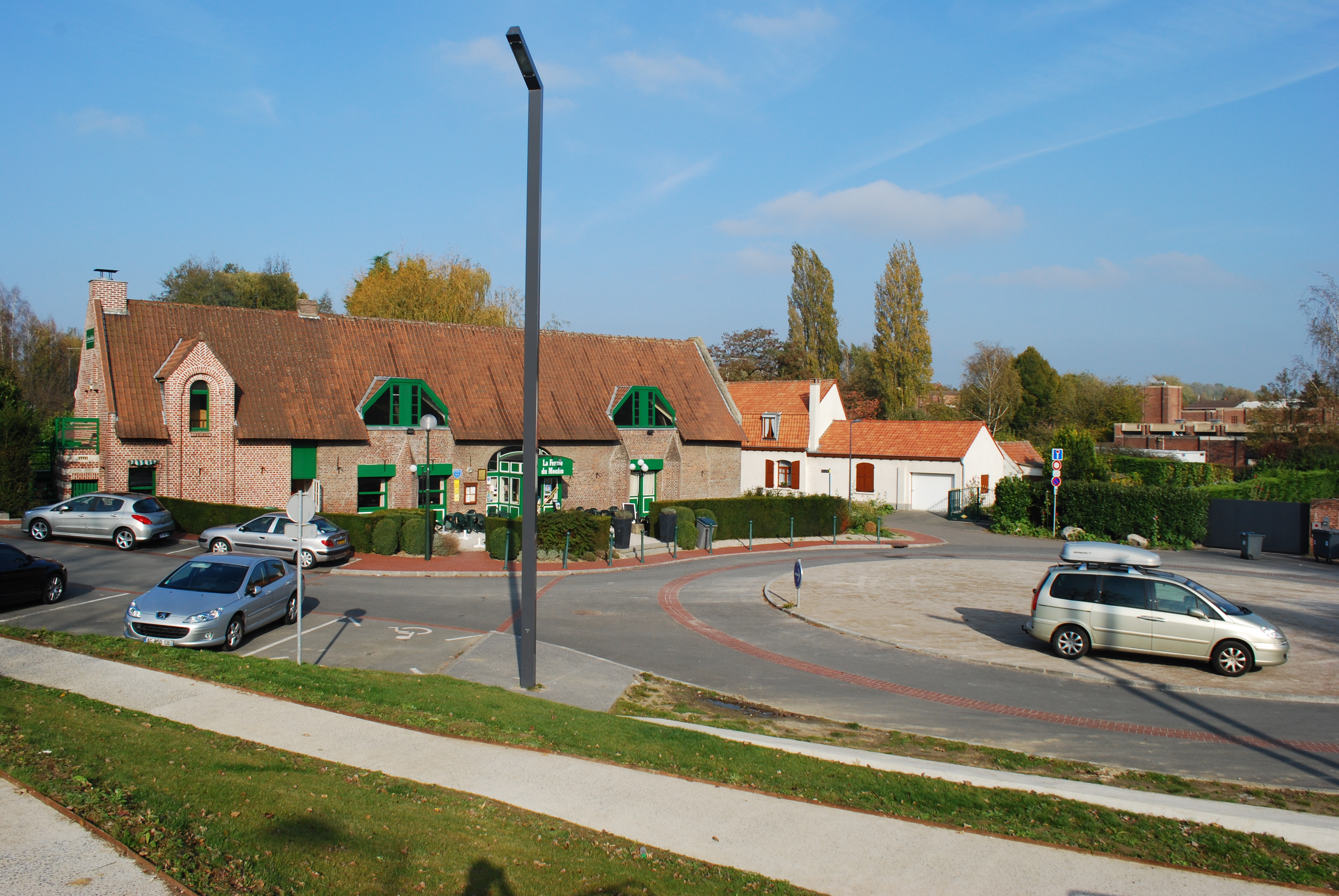
- Established: 1983
- Location: 1, allée du Musée, Villeneuve d'Ascq, France
- Website: www.musee-lam.fr

The Lille Métropole Museum of Modern, Contemporary and Outsider Art (LaM), formerly known as Villeneuve d'Ascq Museum of Modern Art, is an art museum in Villeneuve d'Ascq, France.

With more than 4,500 artworks on a 4,000-square-metre (43,000 sq ft) exhibition area, the LaM is the only museum in Europe to present simultaneously the main components of the 20th and 21st centuries art : modern art, contemporary art and outsider art. LaM's holdings include some masterpieces of Pablo Picasso, Amedeo Modigliani, Joan Miró, Georges Braque, Fernand Léger, Alexander Calder and the biggest outsider art collection in France. LaM possesses also a library and a rich park of sculptures.

The museum's collection offers an overview in modern and contemporary art, including drawings, painting, sculpture, photography, prints, illustrated books and artist's books, and electronic media.

== History ==
The Villeneuve d'Ascq Museum of Modern Art is opened in 1983 to house the collection of modern art donated by Geneviève and Jean Masurel to Lille conurbation. In 1999, the collections were enriched with a collection of outsider art, thanks to the donation made by the association L'Aracine. In 2002, Manuelle Gautrand was the winner of a competition for the restructuring and extension of the museum. The museum was closed in January, 2006 for restructuring. On September 25, 2010, the museum re-opened under a new name, Lille Métropole Museum of Modern, Contemporary and Outsider Art (LaM).

== Architecture ==
The museum was built by Roland Simounet in 1983 in a green setting. The building is registered in French Inventaire supplémentaire des Monuments historiques in 2000.

Manuelle Gautrand designed an extension, covering 2700 m², of which the construction ended in 2010.

== Artworks ==
=== In the park ===
- Alexander Calder, Guillotine pour huit (1962)
- Alexander Calder, Reims, Croix du Sud (1970)
- Jean-Gabriel Coignet, Synclinal (1990)
- Richard Deacon, Between Fiction and Fact (1992)
- Eugène Dodeigne, Groupe de 3 personnages, (1986)
- Jacques Lipchitz, Le Chant des Voyelles (1931–32)
- Pablo Picasso, Femme aux bras écartés (1962)
- Jean Roulland, Maternité, s.d (19??)

=== In the museum: Modern Art ===
- Georges Braque, La Joueuse de mandoline (1917)
- Georges Braque, Le petit éclaireur (1913)
- Georges Braque, Les Usines de Rio Tinto à l’Estaque (1910)
- Georges Braque, Maisons et arbre (1907–1908)
- Bernard Buffet, La Lapidation (1948)
- André Derain, La danse II (~ 1906)
- André Derain, Le Parc des Carrières Saint-Denis (1909)
- Roger de La Fresnaye, Soldat fumant(1919)
- Wassily Kandinsky, Composition (1928)
- Paul Klee, 17 épices (1931)
- Paul Klee, Abendliche Figur
- Henri Laurens, Bouteille et verre (1919)
- Henri Laurens, Les instruments (1928)
- Fernand Léger, Femme au bouquet, (1924)
- Fernand Léger, Le Mécanicien (1918)
- Fernand Léger, Paysage (1914)
- Eugène Leroy, Silhouettes de femmes (~ 1950)
- Joan Miró Peinture (1933)
- Joan Miró, Peinture (1927)
- Joan Miró, Trois personnages sur fond noir (1934)
- Amedeo Modigliani, Nu assis à la chemise (1917)
- Amedeo Modigliani, Maternité (1919)
- Amedeo Modigliani, Moïse Kisling, (1916)
- Amedeo Modigliani, Petit garçon roux (1919)
- Amedeo Modigliani, Tête de femme (~ 1913)
- Pablo Picasso, Homme nu assis (1908–09)
- Pablo Picasso, Le Bock (1909)
- Pablo Picasso, Nature morte espagnole (Sol y sombra) (1912)
- Nicolas de Staël, Composition sur fond gris (1943)
- Maurice Utrillo, Rue de Saint-Louis-en-l’Isle (1918)
- Kees van Dongen, Femme lippue (1909)
- Arthur Van Hecke, Intérieur d’atelier (1954)
- Arthur Van Hecke, Portrait de Roger Dutilleul (1954)

=== In the museum: Contemporary art ===
- Lewis Baltz
- Christian Boltanski
- Daniel Buren, Cabane éclatée aux trois peaux (2000)
- Eugène Dodeigne, Personnage debout (1948)
- François Dufrêne, L’Opéra d’Aran (1965)
- Robert Filliou
- Barry Flanagan, The Boxing Ones (1985)
- Allan McCollum, Perfect vehicules (1988)
- Annette Messager, Faire des cartes de France (2000)
- Dennis Oppenheim
- Lille's artists group Qubo Gas, Paper moon (2009)
- Jean-Michel Sanejouand, Espace-peinture, 21.1.1985 (1985)
- Pierre Soulages, Peinture 222 X 175 cm (1983)
- Jacques Villeglé, DC Lille rue Littré (2000)

=== In the museum: Outsider art ===
- Aloïse Corbaz, sans titre (between 1918 and 1964)
- Aloïse Corbaz, Noël / Château de Blümenstein / Ange (~ 1940–1945)
- Anonymous called les Barbus Müller, Tête avec coiffe (19??)
- Fleury Joseph Crépin, Tableau merveilleux n° 35 (1948)
- Fleury Joseph Crépin, Tableau n° 282 (1945)
- Henry Darger, At Phelantonberg. They are pursued but rescued by the Christian soldiers (before 1973)
- Auguste Forestier, Personnage à profil d’aigle (1935–1949)
- Madge Gill, Sans titre, (1923–1932)
- Madge Gill, Sans titre (1954)
- Pascal-Désir Maisonneuve, La reine Victoria (~ 1927-28)
- Jules Leclercq
- Augustin Lesage, Composition décorative (1936)
- Augustin Lesage, L’Esprit de la pyramide (1926)
- Augustin Lesage, Les Mystères de l'Antique Égypte (1930)
- Guillaume Pujolle, L’Astronome (1946)
- André Robillard, Fusil U.S.A Fichter ARWK (1982)
- Willem Van Genk, Minsk-Moscva (1966–67)
- Adolf Wölfli
- Carlo Zinelli, Grande fiore verde e giallo, macchina e figure (1968)

== Library ==
The LaM possesses a library-research center with nearly 40,000 books.

== Temporary exhibitions ==
- 2010/09/25 - 2011/01/30 : The world as poem. Outsider and Contemporary art exhibition, which highlights artists, writers and film-makers can dwell poetically in the world, in the words of Friedrich Hölderlin.
