= Jean Roulland =

French sculptor (1931–2021)

- Born: 29 March 1931; Croix, France
- Died: 14 February 2021 (aged 89); Vieille-Église, France
- Occupation: Sculptor

Jean Roulland (29 March 1931 – 14 February 2021) was a French sculptor.

== Biography ==
Roulland was one of the artists in the Groupe de Roubaix, alongside Eugène Dodeigne, Germaine Richier, Alfred Manessier, and André Lanskoy. He attended the École des beaux-arts de Roubaix and worked in a ceramics factory before dedicating himself to sculpture full-time in 1960. He lived in Ardèche from 1963 to 1967 before settling permanently in French Flanders. He was influenced by the works of Constantin Brâncuși, creating sculptures in wood, ceramic, and stone. Later in his career, he became fascinated with bronze works, creating many of the sort in his studio. In 1995, he created a series of terracotta heads.

Roulland received the Prix Rodin and the Prix Lenchener in Paris in 1972 and the Kotaro Takamura Grand Prize in Hakone, Japan. His works were exhibited at the Hospice Comtesse in Lille in 1991. In 2010, he was awarded the Prix de Sculpture Maria Pilar de la Béraudière by the Académie des Beaux-Arts. In 2013, a series of exhibitions were displayed in his honor at various places in Nord-Pas-de-Calais.

Roulland died in Vieille-Église on 14 February 2021, at the age of 89.

== Collections ==
Roulland's work is held in the following public collections:

- Fonds national d'art contemporain
- Lille Métropole Museum of Modern, Contemporary and Outsider Art
- Hirshhorn Museum and Sculpture Garden
