= Distillerie de l'Etoile =

Distillerie de l’Etoile – a.k.a. Villers – was a distillery located on Guffenslaan, in Hasselt, Belgium. It was founded in 1834.

== History ==
=== Louis Vanvinckenroy ===
Distillerie de l’Etoile was founded in 1834 by Louis Vanvinckenroy as an agricultural distillery. It produced jenever from surplus grain and also provided sheds for fattening cattle. In 1871 Vanvinckenroy sold the distillery to Florent Villers.

=== Florent Villers (1844-1911) ===
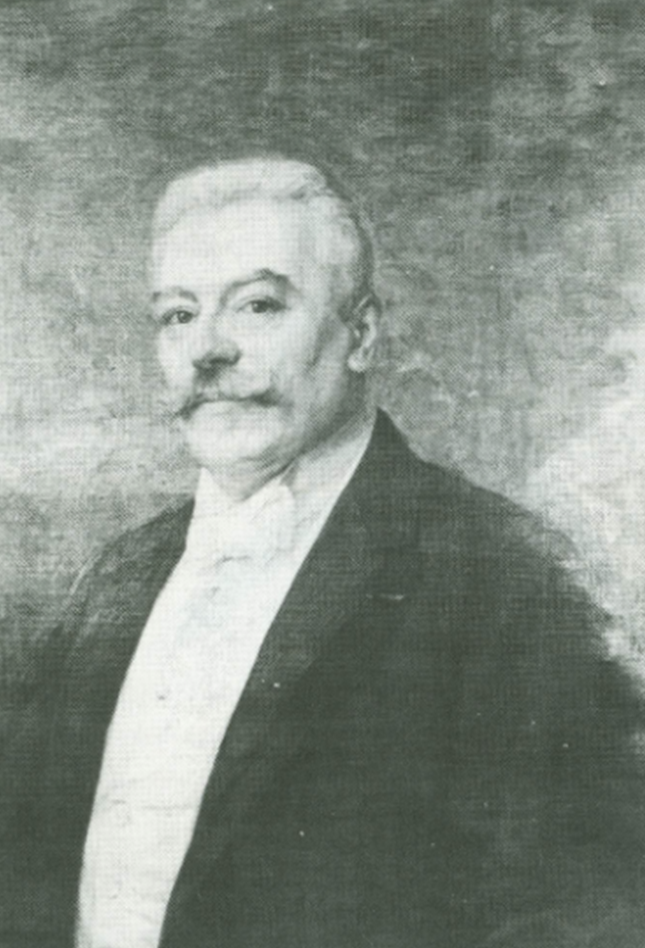
Portrait of Florent Villers (1844-1911)

Florent Villers from Sprimont, a municipality in the Belgian province Liège, settled in Hasselt in 1868. By 1872 he already owned a distillery with warehouses. In 1875, he bought Distillerie de l’Etoile from Louis Vanvinckenroy for the sum of 65,000 Belgian francs.

Like all distillers of that time, Florent Villers was as interested in cattle fattening as he was in jenever production. In 1878 his distillery had a stand at the 1878 Paris Exposition and in that same year he applied to have a 30 hp steam engine installed. In 1880, Florent Villers took part in the Exposition Nationale de Bruxelles, at which he received a commemorative medal. For his cattle breeding Villers was awarded medals of honour on 20 April, 1904 and 22 August, 1906 for the improvement of the breed in Belgium. In 1894 he registered the six-pointed star logo, a reference to the six-pointed stars in the badge of Hasselt’s chamber of rhetoric 'De Roode Roos'.

Florent Villers was a wealthy trader with an extensive network of contacts and interests in other Hasselt companies.

He and Dr Willems both corresponded with the great French chemist and microbiologist Louis Pasteur. Shortly before Florent Villers's death those letters were entrusted to a friend of his and they were never returned to the Villers family.

Florent Villers was one of the initiators of the bank 'Crédit commercial et agricole limbourgeoise', which in 1890 established a new limited company, a porcelain factory named 'Manufactures de porcelaine du Limbourg. Of the thousands of shares, 110 were owned by Florent Villers and he was elected Chairman and Managing Director. When this company went bankrupt, a new one was founded in 1895: the Manufacture de Céramiques Décoratives de Hasselt. Florent Villers was a major financial backer. Notable is that part of this factory’s production was directly related to distilling: it produced, among other things, ceramic jenever bottles.

In 1903 Florent Villers was appointed Director of Manufacture de Céramiques Décoratives de Hasselt and Chairman of the Board of Directors, a position he held until his death in 1911.

When he died, Florent Villers was Chairman of Limburg’s Provincial Agricultural Commission and Chairman of the Limburg Chamber of Commerce, which he had founded in 1905. He was also Chairman of the Taxandria Society (Horse Breeding), Limburgia (cattle breed) and the Hasselt Agricultural Committee, which probably reflects the links between distilleries, industry and agriculture at that time.

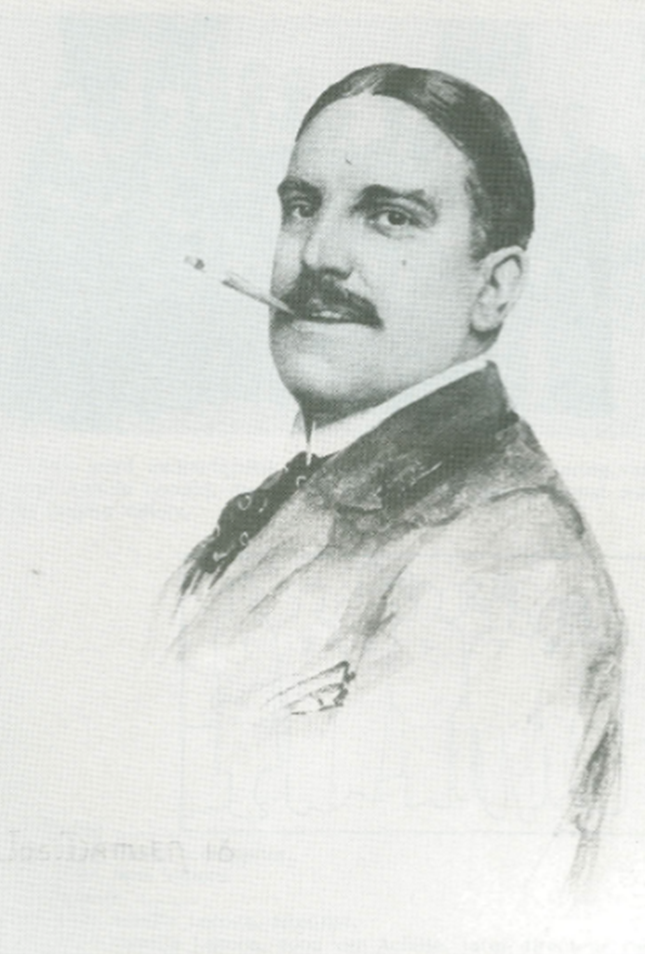
Portrait of Fernand Villers (1879-1919)

=== Fernand Villers (1879-1919) ===
On 1 February, 1908 Florent’s son Fernand Villers took over the agricultural distillery. By this time the company was no longer involved in livestock breeding. Fernand Villers focussed on jenever distilling and started up liqueur production.

Under Fernand Villers the company became more successful and more profitable. A surviving inventory from 1908 lists 1,704 barrels: 597 of less than 100 litres, 1,074 of 100 to 400 litres and 33 of more than 400 litres.

In Augustus 1914 World War I brought an abrupt end to the company’s prosperity and a halt to its activities. All copper vessels were requisitioned by the German occupiers. In August, as a member of the Civic Guard, Fernand Villers was transported to Germany. He was held captive for several months in very harsh conditions and this had serious consequences for his health. As a consequence of his captivity, Fernand Villers died on 7 December, 1919 at the age of forty.

Like his father, Fernand was Chairman of the Limburg Chamber of Commerce.

=== Interbellum ===
In the interbellum period the distillery was confronted with various dilemmas. The first was whether or not it should invest in a new distilling installation to replace the material requisitioned by the Germans. The second was whether it should simultaneously embark on a new commercial path towards retail.

Lacking investment opportunities and relying on its previous good reputation, the company moved into retail, but without adequate commercial organisation and without advertising support. The results of this – and of the switch from distilling to liqueur production – were mediocre. This lacklustre performance was made even worse by the passing of the Vandervelde Act in 1919, which prohibited the stocking and the consumption of spirits in cafés.

By 1930, ten years after the death of Fernand Villers, the company had become marginal in all respects.

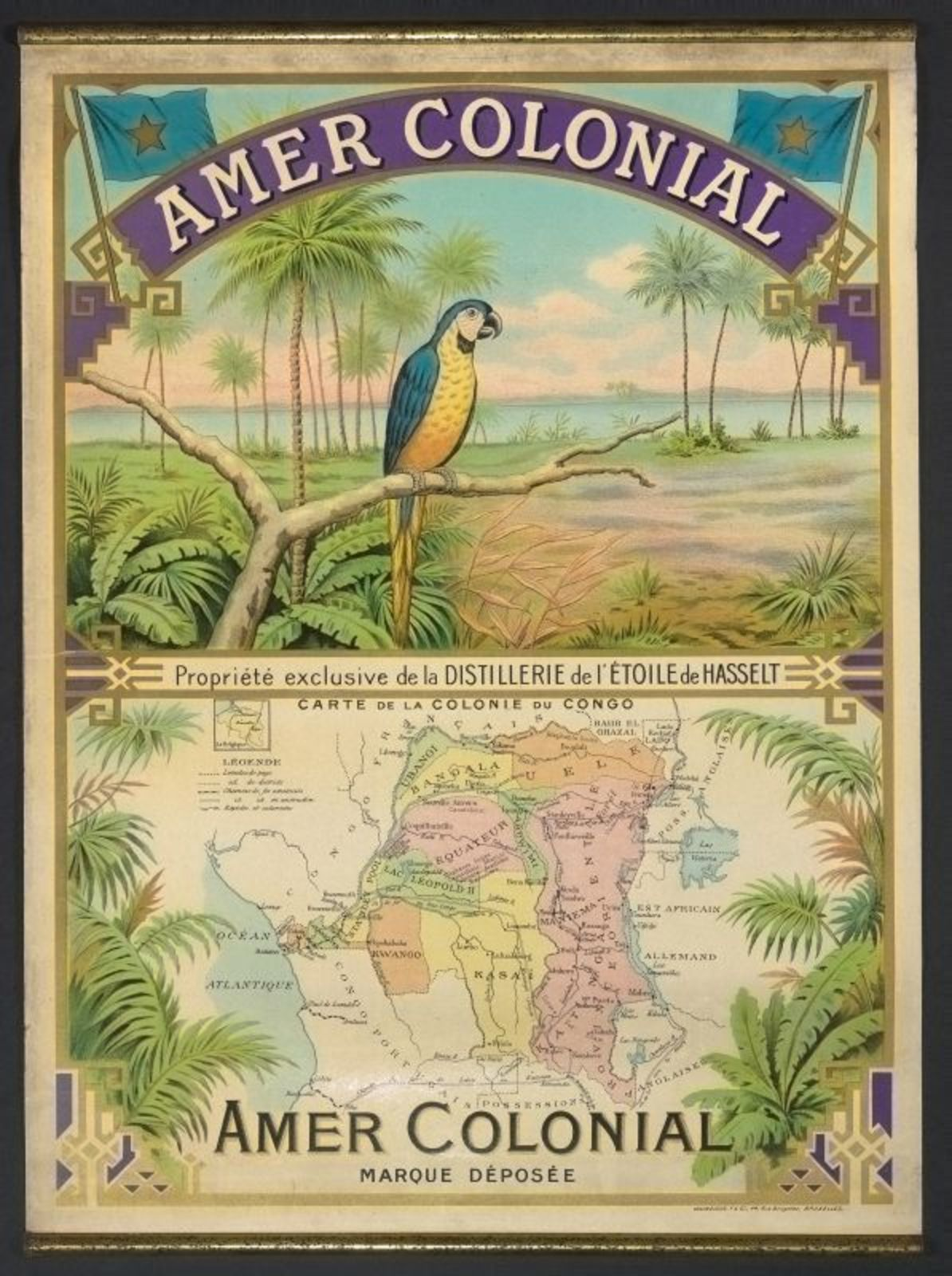
Poster 'Amer Colonial' for distillery Villers in Hasselt, 1910

=== Jean Villers (1906-?) ===
After the death of Fernand Villers, his son Jean Villers took over the company. Under his leadership, two initiatives were taken between 1930 and 1935.

The first was to start was exporting to the Belgian Congo. Because exports were not liable for excise duty, this significantly lowered the cost of the end product. In those days, the bottle, stopper, capsule and label cost more than the contents of the bottle. After a few trial shipments, this initiative was abandoned because of high transport costs and overly complicated red tape.

A second initiative was to add sparkling water to whisky until the alcohol content was lower than 18%. This whisky could then be sold everywhere. At first this initiative was a great success, but unfortunately its success was short-lived, because the administration immediately intervened and amended the law, so that only wine-based products of such high strength could be sold in drinking establishments.

Moreover, at that time the sector was plagued by a number of dubious practices. When preparing liqueurs, for example, unscrupulous manufacturers used illicit alcohol that they either purchased or made themselves by distilling high-strength wine in Greece.

In 1933 Jean Villers and his mother Louise Baar registered the labels Elixir Langeman (Hasselt no. 541, 05-07-1933), Extra Spécial, Excelsior Triple Sec, Bitter 1930 and Beste Oude Kô (Hasselt nos. 544 to 547, 07- 07-1933) under the name ‘Louise Baar, veuve Fernand Villers et Jean Villers, avocat, faisant le commerce sous la dénomination Distillerie de l'Étoile de Hasselt’. In 1938, Louise, as Mrs Villers-Baar, declared that she operated a liqueur factory at 2, 4 and 10 Welvaartstraat.

After failed attempts to make the company profitable, Jean Villers and his mother decided to leave the more than a century-old ‘Distillerie de l'Etoile’. They sold the company in 1939, in Antwerp, to Jacques Neefs.

== The building ==
The distillery was located on Guffenslaan, opposite the gendarmerie barracks, on the western section of the land between the house of notary Gruyters (now Gilissen) and the corner of Toekomststraat (now Welvaartstraat). It has meanwhile been demolished. The new ‘AG’ building has been built on its foundations.

The malt house was located on the other side of what is now Welvaartstraat, but in those days was still Oude Luikerbaan. The distillery’s livestock sheds housed more than two hundred beef cows. These cows were fattened with the spent grain left over after brewing and distilling.

The distillery had a number of livestock sheds. The first was located on Luikersteenweg and the second on Guffenslaan. An ‘isolation shed’ was located on the Begijnenpoel – Stadsomvaart, near to the current Virga Jesse Hospital. When cattle arrived, usually from Argentina, they were quarantined in this ‘isolation shed’.
