= Aloïse =

Aloïse may refer to:

- Aloïse (film), 1975 French film
- Aloïse Corbaz (1886–1964), Swiss outside artist
