= Pascal-Désir Maisonneuve =

French artist and mosaicist

Pascal-Désir Maisonneuve (Bordeaux 1863 – Bordeaux, April 1934) was a French artist and mosaicist whose work is considered to be outsider art.

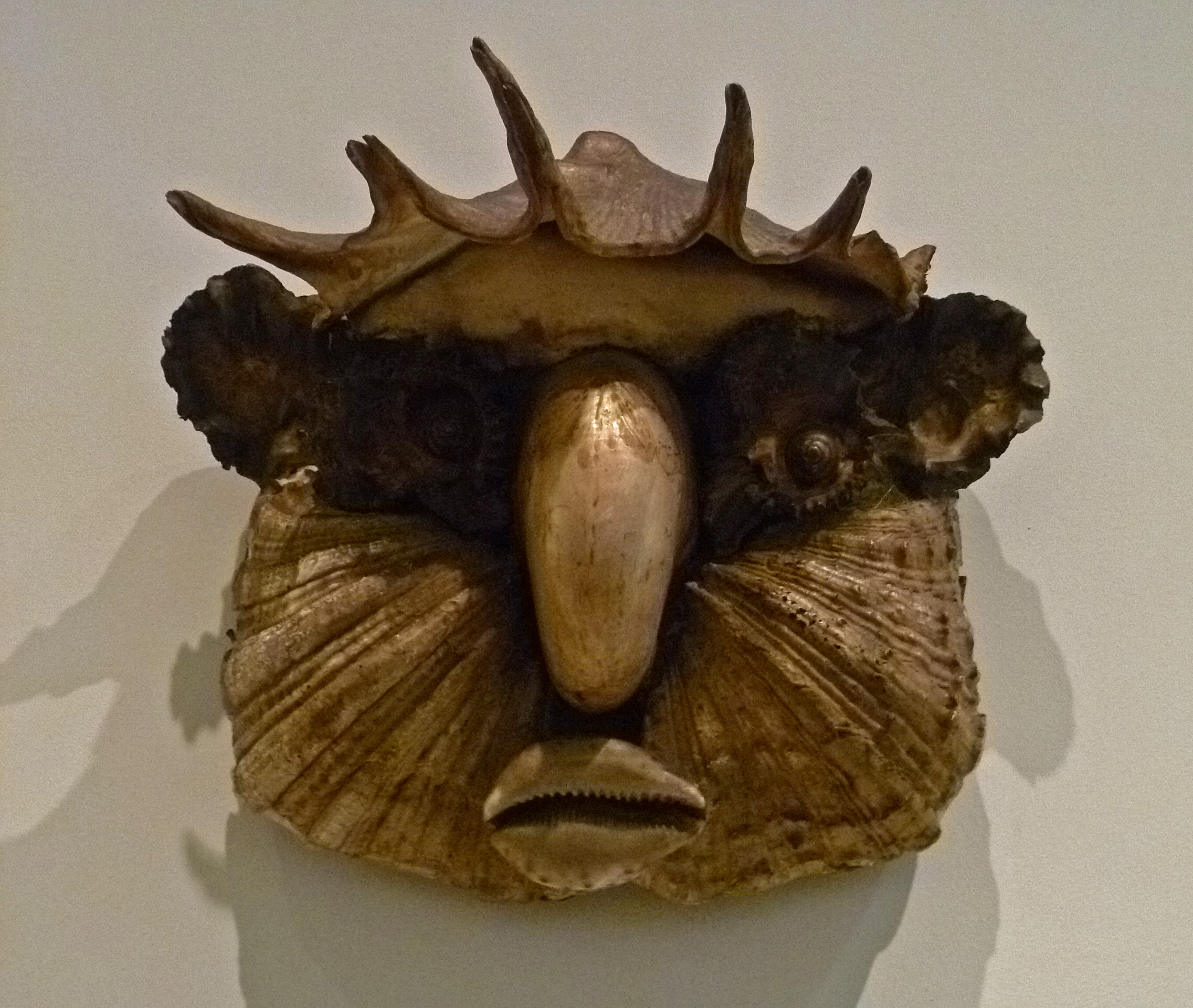
Mask of Queen Victoria, using seashells including a shell of Lambis lambis for the crown, Hippopus species for the cheeks and a cowry for the mouth

He ran a second-hand shop in Bordeaux, France. His hobbies were cycling and weightlifting. But since he was sixteen, his real passion was collecting strange objects and works of art, with an interest in art from any period. He exhibited his collection in his shop. This passion led him to restoring Gallo-Roman mosaics. These mosaics now form part of the collections in the museums of Périgueux and Bordeaux. Maisonneuve also decorated a few castles in the vicinity of Bordeaux.

He was rebellious of mind, and his works displayed his anarchistic and anticlerical feelings in a humorous way. In 1928 he was nominated "Best Worker of France" for his portrait of Sadi Carnot.

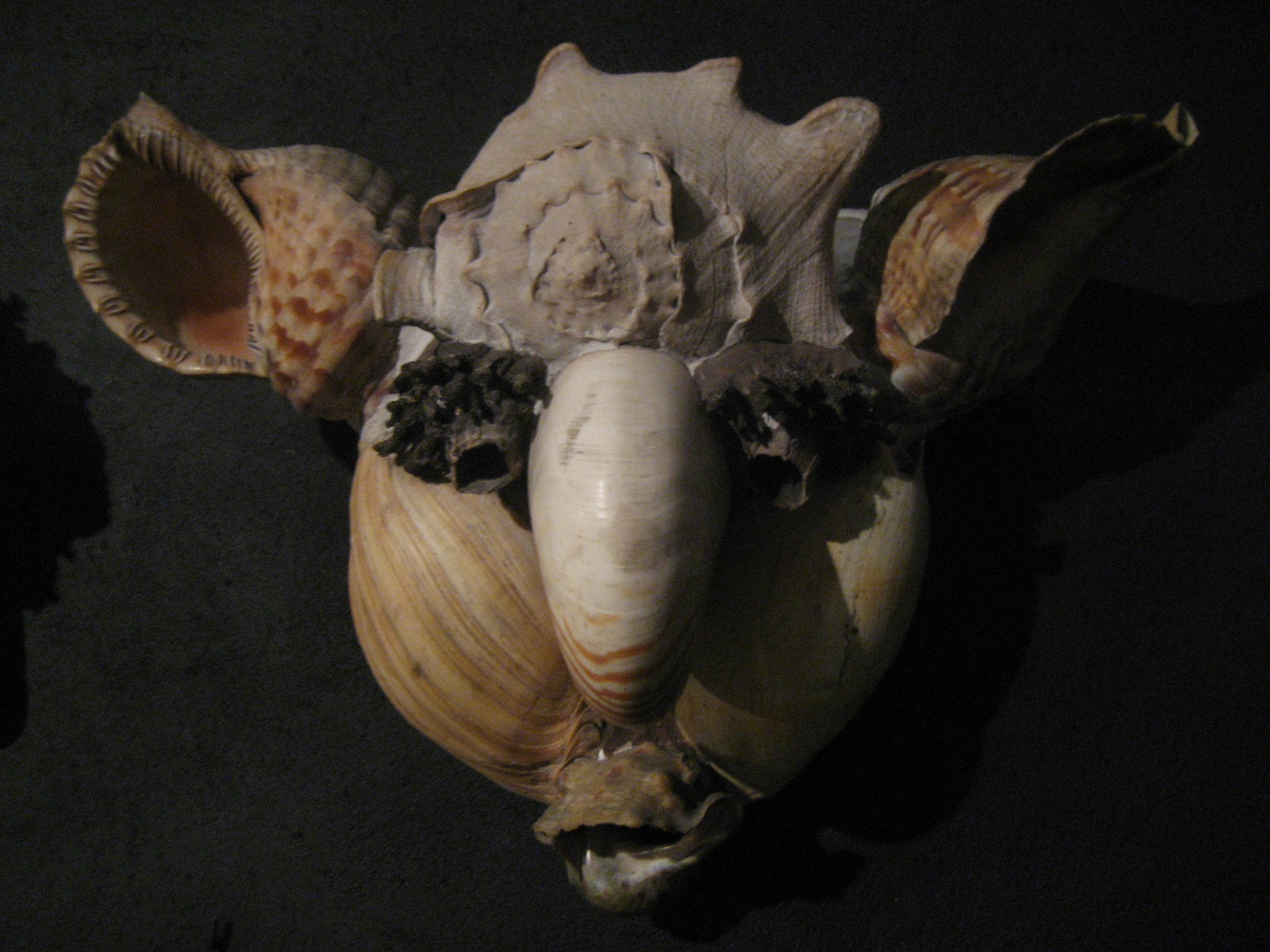
Mask of seashells and plaster, including shells of a Cassis species for the forehead and hair, Charonia species for the ears and Nautilus for the nose

As an artist, Maisonneuve bloomed late in life. At the age of 64, he started a series of fifteen portraits which poked fun at or ridiculed politicians and monarchs from various countries. He made their effigies out of tropical seashells, primarily mollusc shells, which were held together with plaster, working without any concern for the result. He used shells that he already had in his collection, or bought them at jumble sales. He called the series "Les Fourbes de l'Europe" ("Treacherous Rogues of Europe"). The portrait series included masks of Queen Victoria and the emperor William II. and also of the Chinese, the Teuton (French term of abuse for the Germans) and the Tartar. After a while however, Maisonneuve shifted his attention from parody to the study of the human face and its many expressions.

He was a typical example of an outsider artist with a non-premeditated approach of expressing himself. He was not a trained artist, but nonetheless succeeded in producing, in a spontaneous way, works that showed his talent.

The French writer André Breton learned of these masks and showed them to the French painter Jean Dubuffet, who bought nine of them. Dubuffet went on to become the first theoretician of the new art form (what we now call outsider art), which he called "art brut". According to him, this was art produced by people who were not professionals, who operated outside the conventional aesthetic norms, and who did not belong to an artistic milieu.

== Exhibitions ==
- Salon des Indépendants de Bordeaux, 1935
- Galerie René Drouin, Exposition d'art brut, Paris, 1949
- Musée national d'art moderne/Centre Georges Pompidou, Création en France, 1937–1957, Paris 1981
- Musée national d'art moderne/Centre Georges Pompidou, André Breton, "La beauté convulsive", Paris 1991
- Exhibitions of the masks of Maisonneuve at the "Galerie du Musée des Beaux-Arts de Bordeaux", Bordeaux, France (4 November 2010 until 30 January 2011)

== Museums ==
- Lille Métropole Museum of Modern, Contemporary and Outsider Art, Villeneuve d'Asq, France
