= Musée de Préhistoire d'Île-de-France =

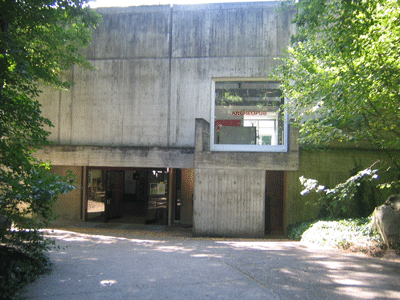
- Musée de Préhistoire d'Île-de-France
- Interactive fullscreen map
- Established: January 10, 1981
- Location: 48 Avenue Etienne Dailly; 77140 Nemours; France
- Coordinates: 48°15′37″N 2°42′50″E
- Type: Museum
- Director: Anne-Sophie Leclerc
- Public transit access: Nemours
- Website: musee-prehistoire-idf.fr

The Musée de Préhistoire d'Île-de-France (Ile-de-France Prehistory Museum), located in Nemours, in Seine-et-Marne, is a departmental museum with a regional vocation. It presents the Prehistory of the Paris Basin, from the first vestiges attesting to the presence of Man, more than 500,000 years ago, to the end of the Gallic period, in the last quarter of the 1st century BC. AD.

Completed in 1980, the raw concrete and glass building is the work of architect and urban planner Roland Simounet.

== General presentation ==
Leaning against the natural slope of the land, the museum is surrounded by a forest of regional tree species (pines, oaks, birches, hornbeams, hazelnuts, acacias, etc.) and by sandstone boulders. The picturesque natural site is part of the forest of Nemours-Poligny, which is itself a southern extension of the forest of Fontainebleau.

The path inside the museum that guides visitors through the exhibition is chronological. The rooms, distributed around patio-gardens presenting the flora of the different periods of Prehistory, are largely open to the outside through bay windows. Large floor casts (from the prehistoric sites of Pincevent and Étiolles) evoke the excavation work and show the archaeological sites as they first appeared to the archaeologists who discovered them. The tour ends with the presentation of a large dugout canoe from the Carolingian period, discovered in an old channel of the Seine at Noyen-sur-Seine (Seine-et-Marne).

The Musée de Préhistoire d'Île-de-France offers a flexible programme that caters to the interests and needs of school groups, adults, children and people with disabilities.

== See also ==
- Prehistoric rock engravings of the Fontainebleau Forest

== Bibliography ==
- Un enclos dans la forêt : Roland Simounet : le Musée de préhistoire de Nemours, Paris, les Productions du EFFA, 2018, 110 p. (BNF 45597020)
- Jean-Bernard Roy and René Delon, Nemours : Musée de préhistoire d'Île-de-France, Edition du Castelet, 1992, 28 p. (BNF 35524220)
