= List of protected heritage sites in Sprimont =

This table shows an overview of the protected heritage sites in the Walloon town Sprimont. This list is part of Belgium's national heritage.

Object	Year/architect	Town/section	Address	Coordinates	Number^{?}	Image
Castle Chanxhe and the ensemble of the castle, church and surrounding areas ^{(nl)} ^{(fr)}		Sprimont	Sprimont	50.498597°N 5.594898°E	62100-CLT-0001-01 Info	
The one hundred-year-old lime tree of Louveigné ^{(nl)} ^{(fr)}		Sprimont		50.530471°N 5.714417°E	62100-CLT-0006-01 Info	De honderdjarige linde van Louveigné More images
Chapel of Notre-Dame du Bon Secours Trôleu and the ensemble of the chapel, the surrounding area and the two lime trees that shade it ^{(nl)} ^{(fr)}		Sprimont	Louveigné	50.527813°N 5.713748°E	62100-CLT-0007-01 Info	Kapel van Notre-Dame de Bon Secours du Trôleu en het ensemble van de kapel, het omliggende terrein en de twee lindebomen die schaduw geven
Ensemble of three lime trees growing on the cadastral plot n °F 912th ^{(nl)} ^{(fr)}		Sprimont	Louveigné	50.518708°N 5.699584°E	62100-CLT-0008-01 Info	
Touristic view of Raboster ^{(nl)} ^{(fr)}		Sprimont	Louveigné	50.525546°N 5.736995°E	62100-CLT-0009-01 Info	
Ensemble of the blood red rocks ^{(nl)} ^{(fr)}		Sprimont	Rouvreux	50.481029°N 5.672179°E	62100-CLT-0013-01 Info	Ensemble van de bloedrode rotsen
Expansion of the blood red rocks ^{(nl)} ^{(fr)}		Sprimont	Rouvreux	50.481064°N 5.673037°E	62100-CLT-0014-01 Info	Uitbreiding van de bloedrode rotsen
Ensemble of three lime trees around a calvary located south of the hamlet of Lille ^{(nl)} ^{(fr)}		Sprimont	Rouvreux	50.498807°N 5.647065°E	62100-CLT-0015-01 Info	Ensemble van de drie lindebomen rond een calvarie gesitueerd ten zuiden van het buurtschap Lille More images
Ensemble of the ruins of the castle of Amblève and their immediate surroundings ^{(nl)} ^{(fr)}		Sprimont		50.479930°N 5.645193°E	62100-CLT-0016-01 Info	
two redwood trees on the east side of the park Florze ^{(nl)} ^{(fr)}		Sprimont	Rouvreux	50.487509°N 5.667310°E	62100-CLT-0019-01 Info	
The facades and roofs of the chapel of Saint-Hubert and Sainte-Vierge de Blindef ^{(nl)} ^{(fr)}		Sprimont	Sprimont	50.524750°N 5.694934°E	62100-CLT-0020-01 Info	
Facades and roofs, except the staircase of the entrance with walls and their extensions to the fortified house ^{(nl)} ^{(fr)}		Sprimont	rue de Mierdy n°4, Damré	50.504477°N 5.678830°E	62100-CLT-0022-01 Info	
The lime tree called "the Merinet" with an area of land about 25 meters around it ^{(nl)} ^{(fr)}		Sprimont		50.485355°N 5.599375°E	62100-CLT-0023-01 Info	
Expansion of the site of the lime tree "the Merinet" ^{(nl)} ^{(fr)}		Sprimont	Sprimont	50.485057°N 5.597318°E	62100-CLT-0024-01 Info	
The facades and roofs of the main building and community buildings, as well as the surrounding wall and fountains, pillars and entrance ^{(nl)} ^{(fr)}		Sprimont	rue d'Andoumont 91, Gomzée	50.548048°N 5.700720°E	62100-CLT-0025-01 Info	
The total stone museum ^{(nl)} ^{(fr)}		Sprimont	rue J. Potier 13 bis, Sprimont	50.504991°N 5.664879°E	62100-CLT-0026-01 Info	
All archaeological remains identified and located on the site called "Sous les-Fays" and the ensemble of the remains and the surrounding areas ^{(nl)} ^{(fr)}		Sprimont	Sprimont	50.504573°N 5.598253°E	62100-CLT-0027-01 Info	
Site of the landscape Trixhe Nollet called "La petite Fagne de Hayen" ^{(nl)} ^{(fr)}		Sprimont		50.543804°N 5.621275°E	62100-CLT-0030-01 Info	
Fortified tower of Louveigné (Sprimont) and the ensemble of the tower and surrounding areas ^{(nl)} ^{(fr)}		Sprimont	rue du Gravier n°s 7, 9 en 11	50.529395°N 5.711444°E	62100-CLT-0031-01 Info	
Eight border posts of the Marquisate of Franchimont in the country of Liege and the settlement of Louveigné, municipality of Stavelot ^{(nl)} ^{(fr)}		Sprimont		50.528216°N 5.758792°E	62100-CLT-0032-01 Info	

== See also ==
- List of protected heritage sites in Liège (province)
- Sprimont
