= Roland Simounet =

French architect (1927-1996)

- Born: 31 August 1927; Guyotville, Algeria
- Died: 10 February 1996 (aged 68); Paris, France
- Occupation: Architect
- Awards: Grand Prix National d'Architecture 1977
- Practice: Roland Simounet Architect
- Buildings: Musée Picasso, Paris, France; LaM, Villeneuve d'Ascq, France; Djenan el-Hassan, Algeria

Roland Simounet (born in Guyotville, Algeria, 31 August 1927; died in Paris, 10 February 1996) was a French architect known primarily for his design of the Musée Picasso in Paris and the LaM in Villeneuve d'Ascq.

== Biography ==
Simounet studied architecture in Paris and then returned to his native Algeria where he opened an office in 1952. His first major work, the emergency cité de transit Djenan el-Hassan (1956-8), reflected his concern with the eradication of slum housing; its cellular construction, with individual vaulted roofs, echoed local vernacular architectural forms. In 1958 he was appointed to plan the new city of Thamugadi, which borders the famous Roman ruins of Timgad. After the War of Independence, Simounet moved to Paris (1963), but many of his works continued to address the problems of design for warm climates through the suitable expression of materials, massing and openings; examples include the student housing (1962–70) for the University of Tananarive, Madagascar, and a series of holiday homes in Corsica.

Simounet became one of the most prolific museum builders in France in the 1970s and 1980s. His new buildings for the Musee de la Prehistoire de l'Ile-de-France (1975-9), Nemours, and the Musee d'Art Moderne du Nord (1978–83), Villeneuve d'Ascq, reveal a careful orchestration of natural lighting and details to enhance the individual display of works of art. He also won the limited competition for the conversion of the 17th-century Hôtel Salé in the Marais district of Paris into the Musée Picasso (1976–85); the austere and luminous quality of the white-washed walls and pristine volumes was generally acknowledged to be the perfect showcase for Picasso's personal collection. In Saint-Denis he designed some low-cost housing (1983) in the shadow of the abbey; arranged around small courtyards, it alluded to the historic fortifications. The same parti was used in the les Fongéres residential complex (1987–91) facing the Parc Citroén in Paris.

Simounet was awarded the Grand Prix National d'Architecture in 1977. Simounet died in Paris in 1996.

== Bibliography ==
Roland Simounet a L'oeuvre: Architecture, 1951-1996 by Richard Klein, Roland Simounet, Musee d'art moderne Lille metropole, ISBN 2-86961-060-2 (2-86961-060-2)

Roland Simounet: D'une Architecture Juste by Roland Simounet Le Moniteur, 1997, ISBN 2-281-19095-1 (2-281-19095-1)

Roland Simounet: Pour Une Invention De L'espace by Roland Simounet Electa Moniteur, 1986, ISBN 2-86653-024-1 (2-86653-024-1)
