= Eugène Dodeigne =

French sculptor (1923-2015)

Eugène Dodeigne (27 July 1923 – 24 December 2015) was a French sculptor living and working at Bondues (Nord-Pas-de-Calais).

== Life ==
Dodeigne was born in Rouvreux, near Liège. He learned his trade from his father, a stonecutter, who hired him to take courses in drawing and modeling at Tourcoing and Paris at the École nationale supérieure des Beaux-Arts, where he experienced a revelation in the studio of Marcel Gimond. It was under the influence of the abstract forms of Constantin Brâncuși. He then follows, in 1960, the path of chipped stone that leads to an abrupt figuration, highly expressive, continuing until his most recent sculptures. he also absorbs the counting of Giacometti and Germaine Richier. When asked to recall his early works and his influences, he remains elusive.

He exhibited at the Jean Brody Galerie, Galerie Claude Bernard, Gallery Pierre Loeb, the Galerie Jeanne Bucher, then in Berlin, Hanover, Rotterdam, Brussels and Pittsburgh provide him, in the 1960s, international recognition which does not disturb his exploration. In 1968, he devoted himself to a series of sculptures combining new way of smooth surfaces and volumes of irregular stone exploded.

In the 1970s, the Group of Ten (Prouvost Foundation, Marcq-en-Barœul) devoted his evolution towards the monumental, which coincides with the simultaneous development of outdoor sculpture in cities and parks. His sculpture populates many cities and museums of North: Lille, Dunkirk, Villeneuve d'Ascq, Antwerp, Liege, Hanover, Utrecht, then Bobigny, Argentan and Paris, to Grenoble in 1998 and Créteil, more recently.

He participated in the Paris Biennale in 1985, an exhibition at the Rodin Museum in 1988, his participation in the Champs de Sculpture in 1995, Made in France at the Musée National d'Art Moderne in 1996, and his presence in the new park Sculpture in the Tuileries Gardens in 1999, an exhibition at the Fondation de Coubertin (Saint-Rémy-lès-Chevreuse) in 2002, confirms the growing importance Dodeigne occupies in the history of sculpture of the second part of 20th century.

== Sculptures ==
- 1948, Figure debout, bois, Lille Métropole Museum of Modern, Contemporary and Outsider Art, Villeneuve-d'Ascq
- 1956, Figure couchée, pierre de Soignies, Lille Métropole Museum of Modern, Contemporary and Outsider Art, Villeneuve-d'Ascq
- 1970, Groupe de dix figures, pierre de Soignies, Septentrion, Fondation Albert et Anne Prouvost, Marcq-en-Barœul
- 1974, Groupe des cinq, marbre de Carrara (Italie), Palais des Beaux-Arts de Lille
- 1976–1979, Groupe des trois, pierre de Soignies, fontaine de la Place de la République, Lille
- 1979, Les Pleureuses, pierre de Soignies, jardin des sculptures du Lieu d'Art et d'Action Contemporaine (LAAC), Dunkerque
- Mémorial Charles de Gaulle, jardin Vauban, Lille
- Couple, Museum of Grenoble

== Honors and awards ==
Knight of the Order of Legion of Honour

== Gallery ==
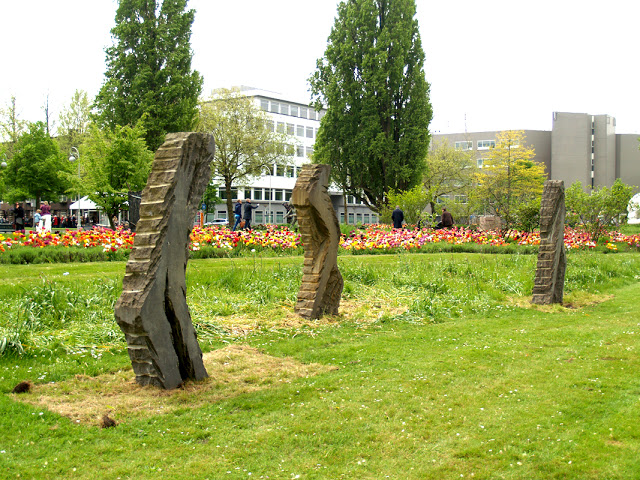
Art Zuid Drie Dansers

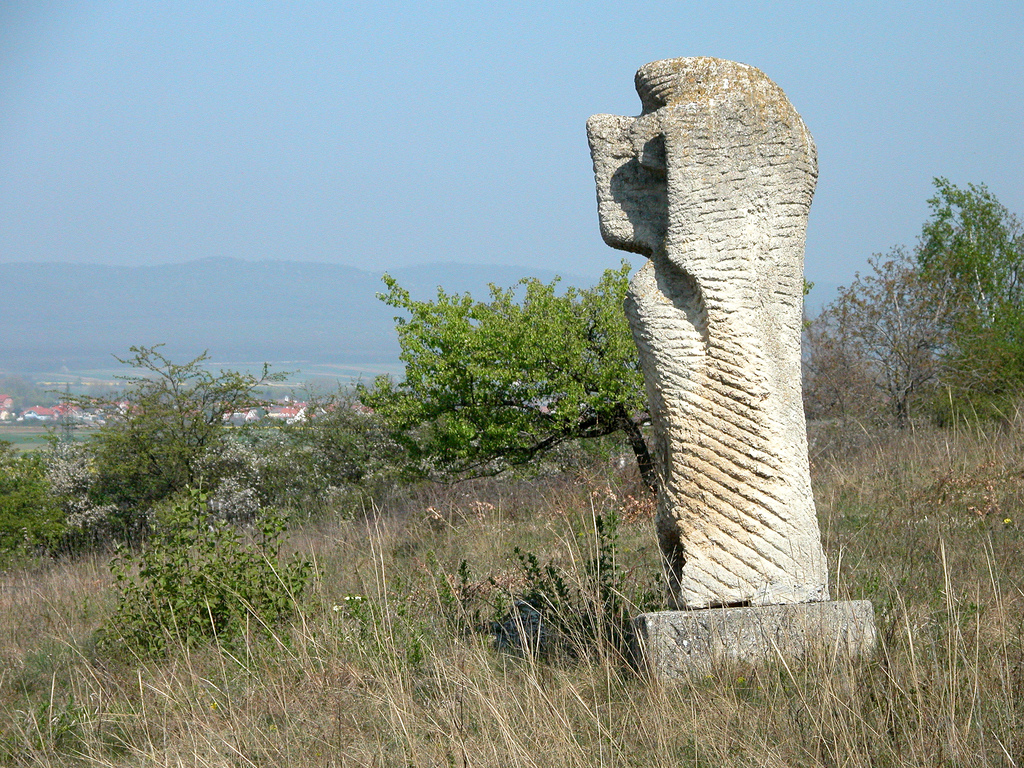
Sans titre (1959), St. Margarethen.

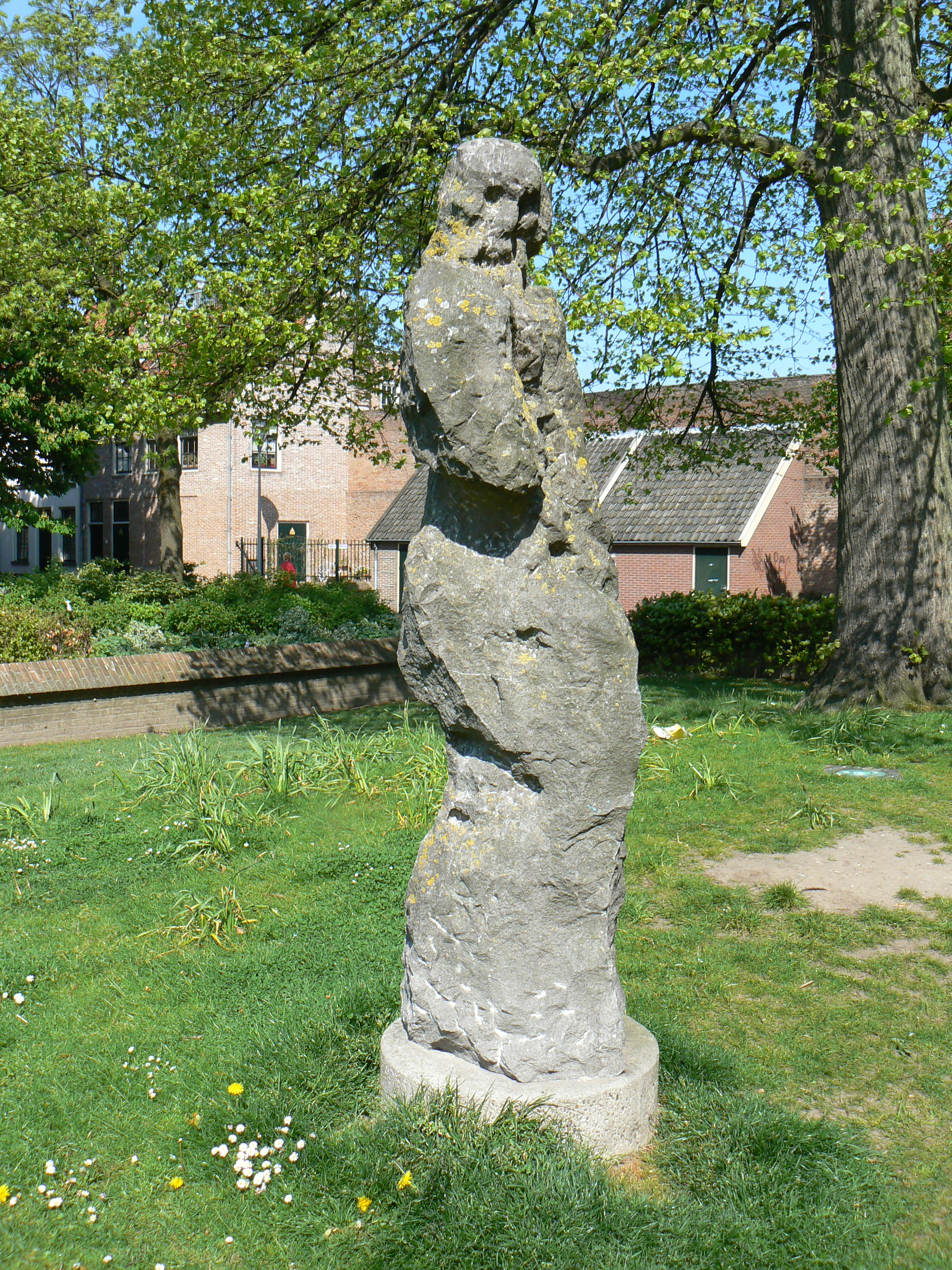
Figure (1964), Ville de Zwolle.

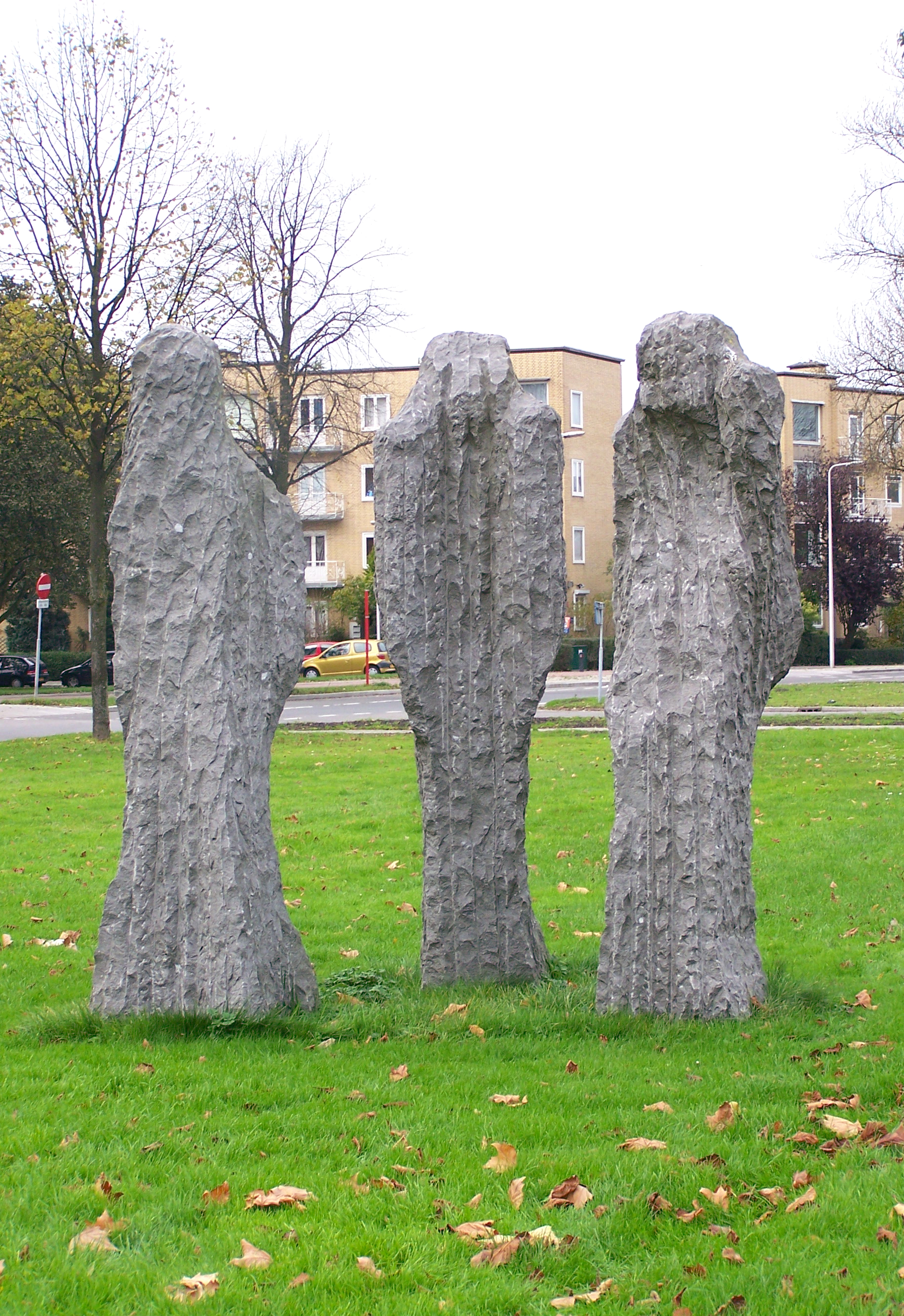
Trois figures (1979), Joseph Haydnlaan, Utrecht.

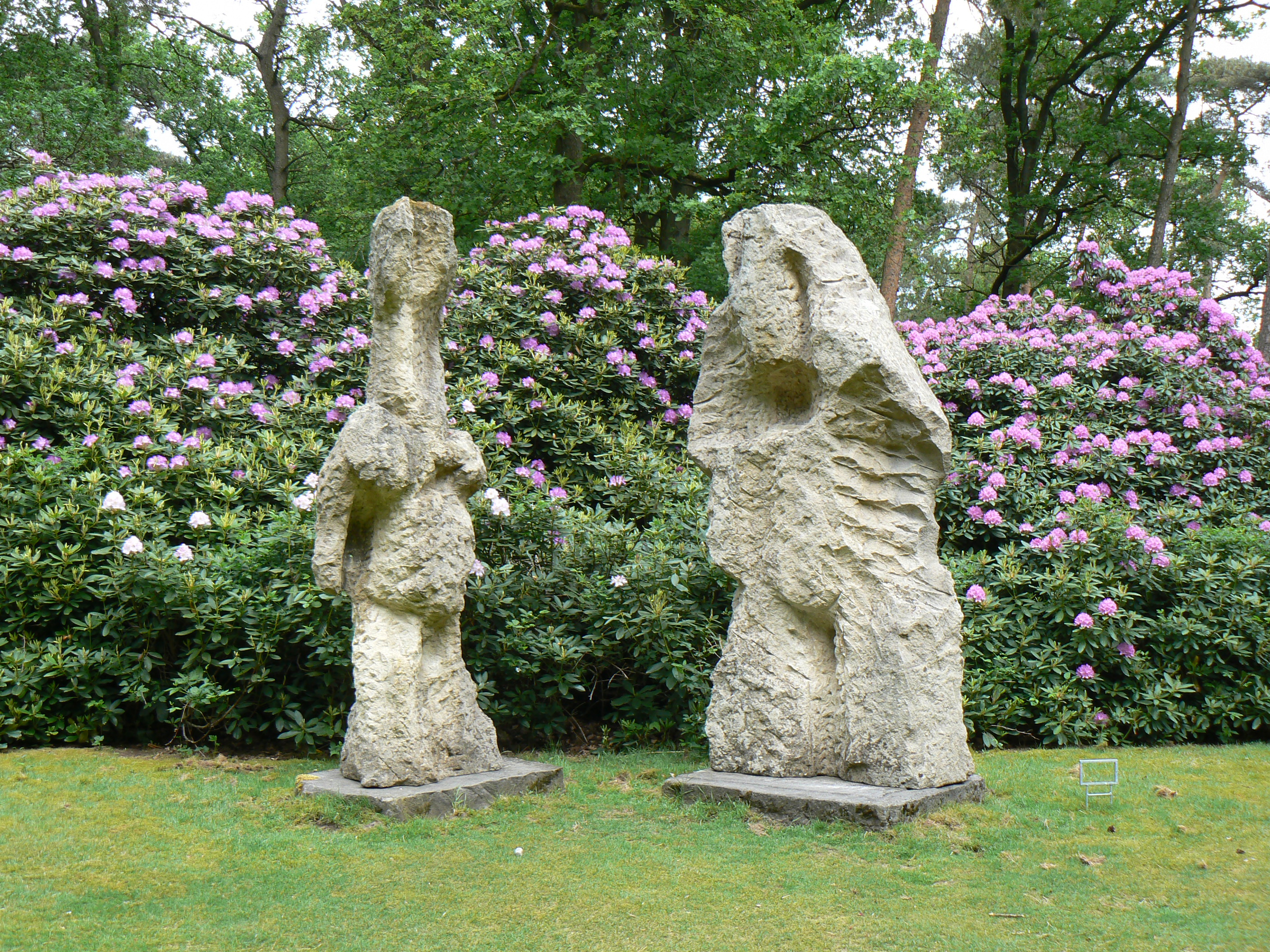
Homme et femme (1963), Kroller-Muller Museum, Otterlo.

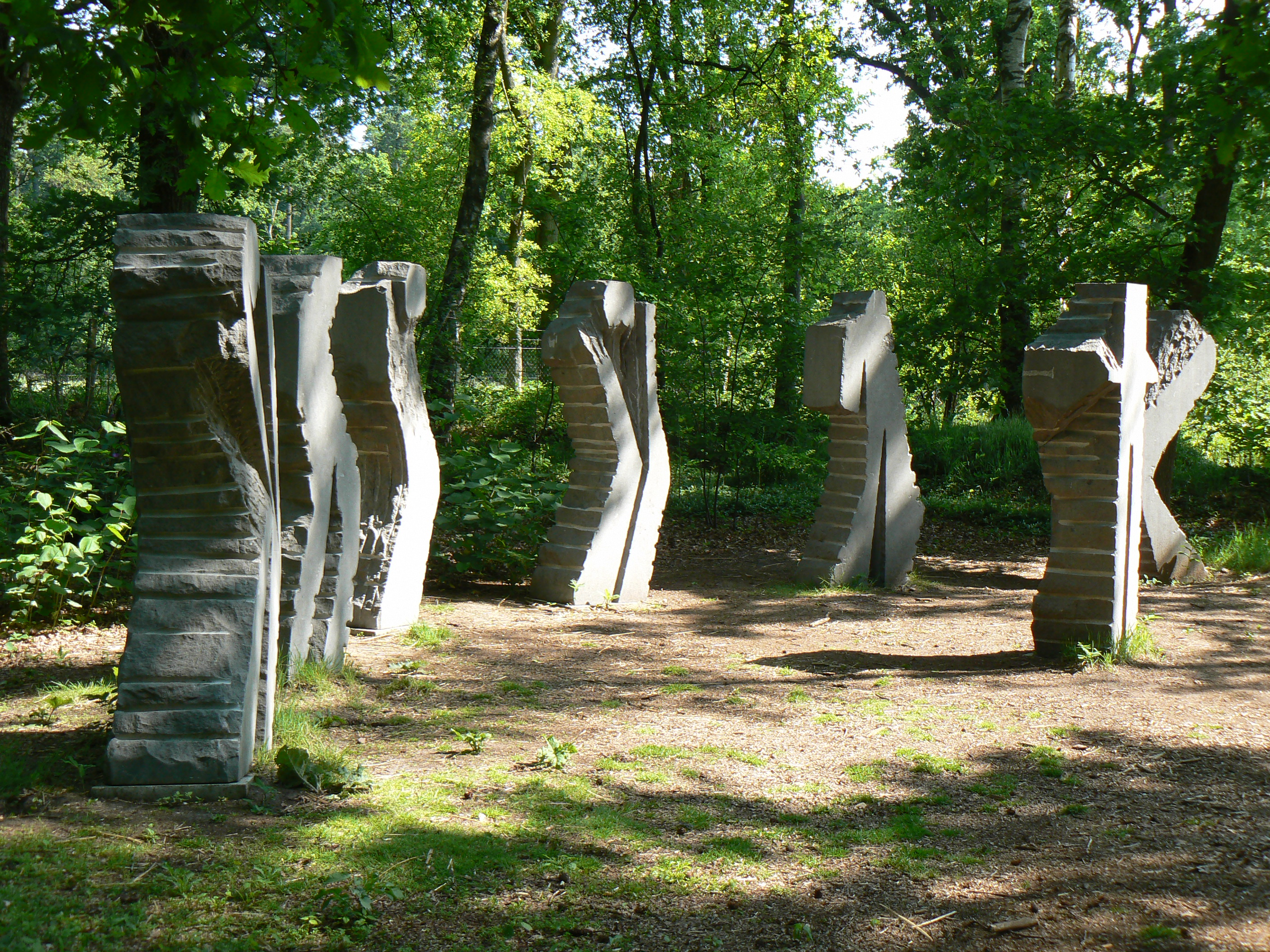
Groupe de sept (1993), Kroller-Muller Museum, Otterlo.

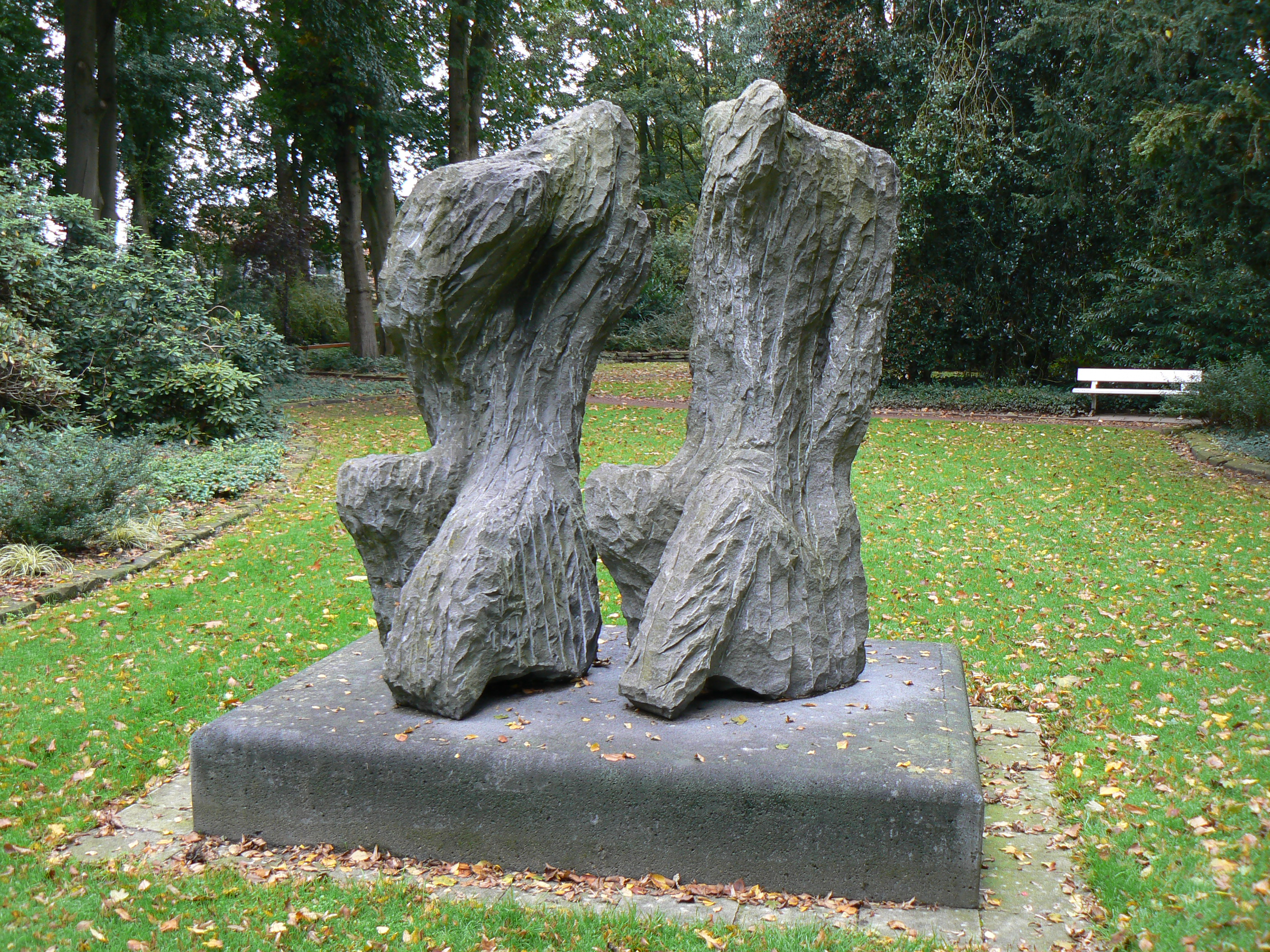
Confidence (1986), Nordhorn.

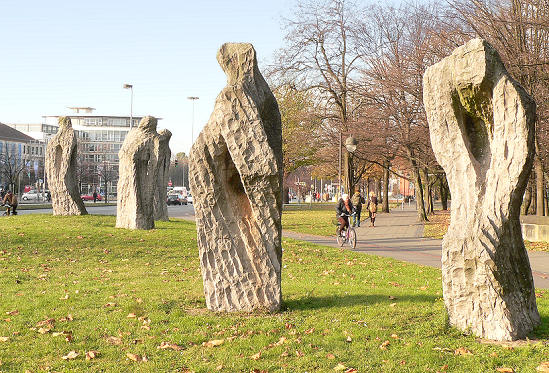
Famille (1982), Skulpturenmeile à Hannover.

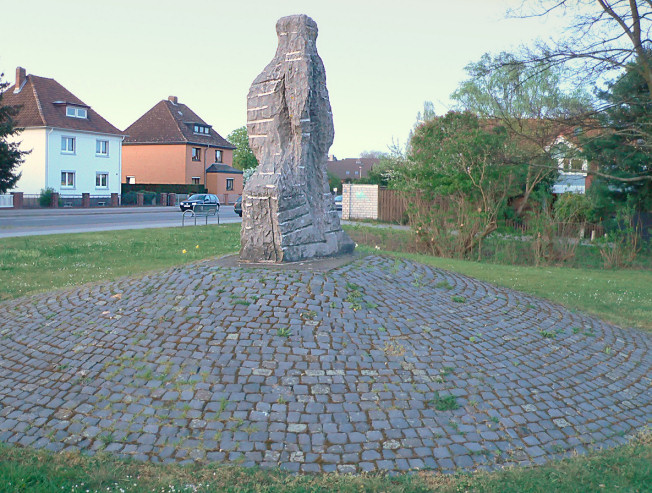
Figure, Außenlager à Hannover.

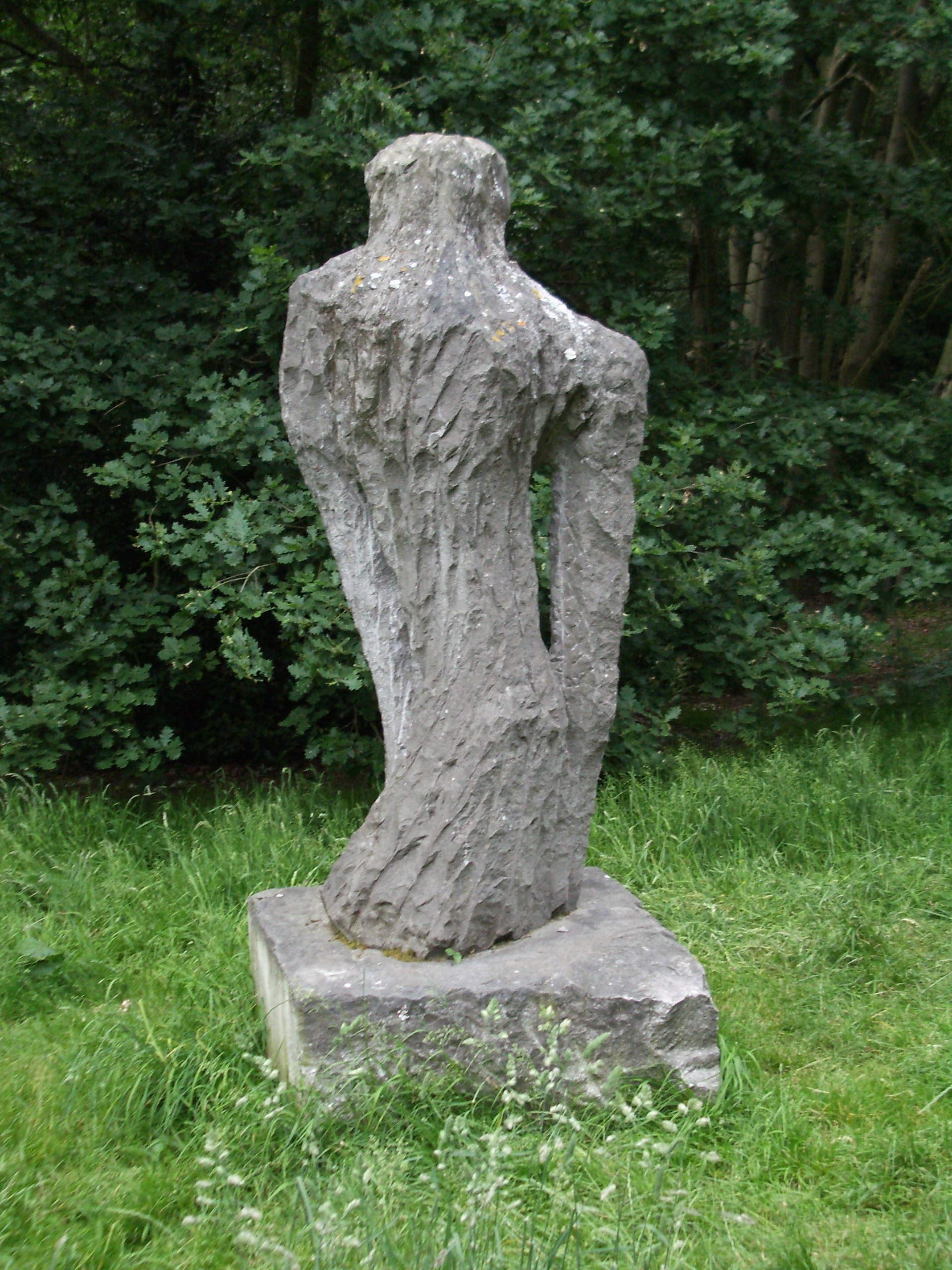
Flamme (1983), Kenwood House, London.
