= Augustin Lesage =

French painter

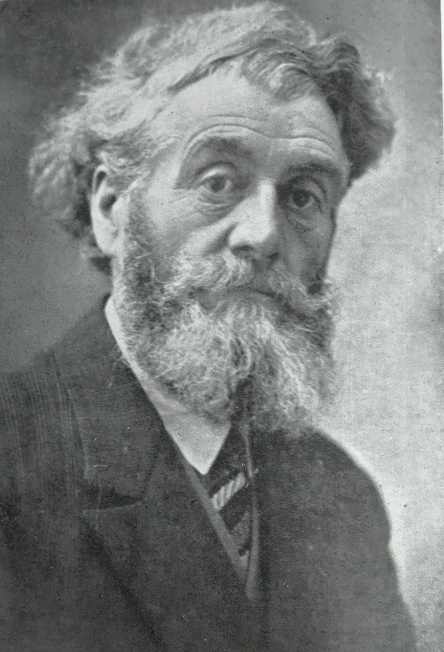
- Lesage in 1938
- Born: 9 August 1876; Saint-Pierre-les-Auchel
- Died: 21 February 1954 (aged 77)
- Occupation: Painter

Augustin Lesage (9 August 1876 – 21 February 1954) was a French coal miner who became a painter and artist through the help of what he considered to be spirit voices. His style utilizes patterns and symmetry on a large scale, often accompanied by bright, vibrant colors. He was untrained and is considered an outsider artist, part of Art Brut.

== Life ==
Lesage was born in Saint-Pierre-les-Auchel, Pas-de-Calais, into a family of miners and was sent to work in a coal mine from an early age.

In 1911, when he was 35 years old, Lesage claimed he heard a voice speak to him from the darkness of the mine and tell him, "One day you will be a painter". The only contact Lesage had had with the arts at that point in his life was a visit to the Palais des Beaux-Arts de Lille museum in Lille during his military service. The voice experience prompted him to explore communication with what he believed was the spirit world, and within a year of his first experience Lesage was hearing more voices, this time specifically giving him instructions. The voice told him what to paint, what art supplies to buy and where to find them. It was his belief that the voice speaking to him was the spirit of his little sister who had died at the age of three.

Lesage claimed that when starting a new work he never had any idea about what he would paint: "I never have an overview of the entire work at any point of the execution. My guides tell me; I surrender to their impulse".

From 1912 Lesage began to produce a regular output of paintings. His service in the First World War interrupted his artistic pursuits, but he was able to resume his work in 1916. By 1923, Lesage was able to support himself exclusively with his artistic efforts.

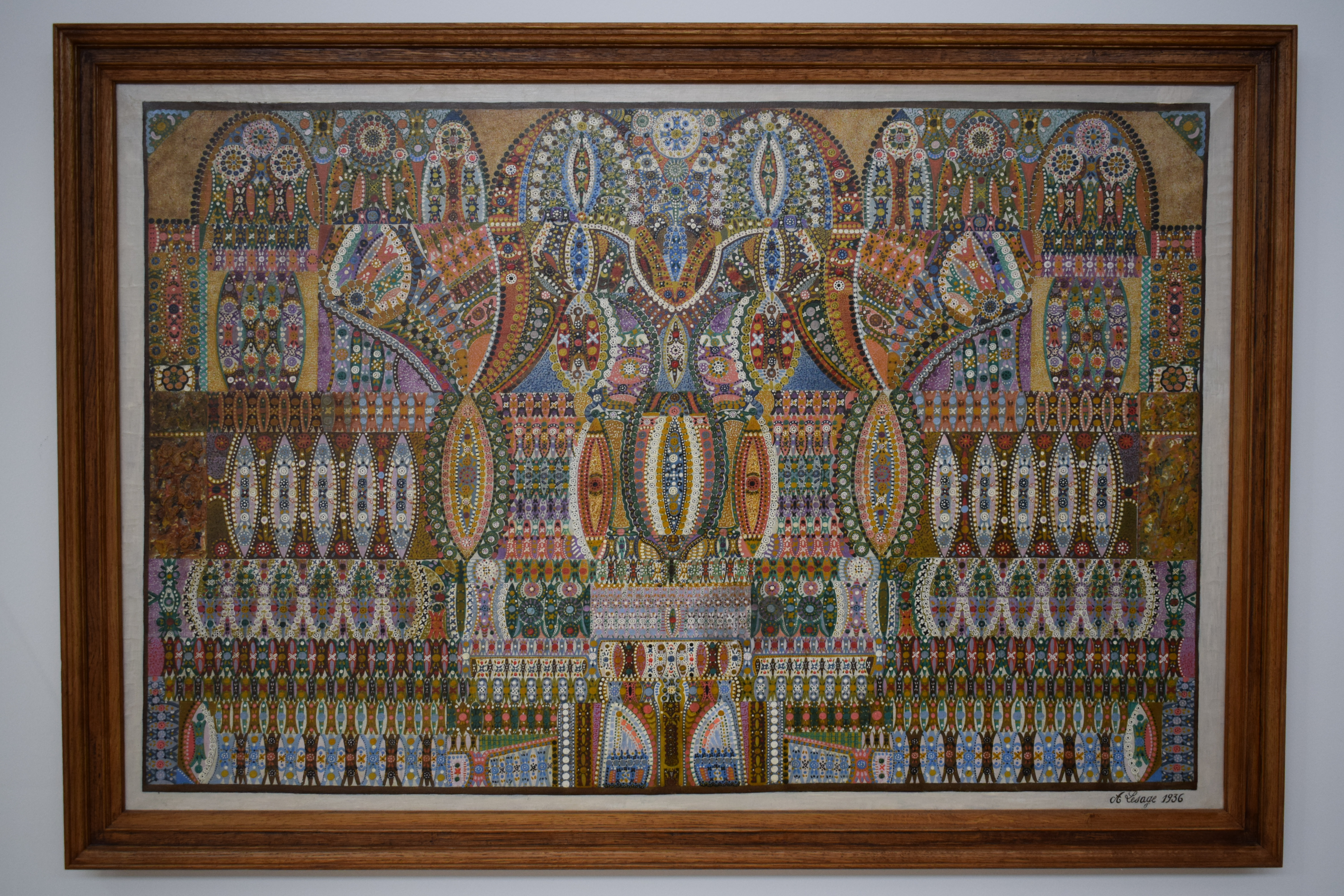
Painting at LaM

The collector Jean Dubuffet integrated Lesage paintings into his collection in 1948, and bought his first "historic" canvas for 50,000 francs in 1964. Lesage is one of the artists featured in the booklet Art Brut Art Brut 3 by Jean Dubuffet in 1964. His work is also categorized as part of the spiritualist movement in art.

Augustin Lesage paintings are represented in the Collection de l'Art Brut (Outsider Art Collection) in Lausanne, Switzerland since its opening in 1975. He was the subject of a retrospective presented at Lausanne in 1989, a catalog was published for the occasion. He is historically the earliest of the "psychic artists" embedded in the Collection de l'Art Brut.

His volume of work is very large. At his death, he left about eight hundred paintings. Today, most of his works are held by the Lille Métropole Museum of Modern, Contemporary and Outsider Art in France. Works by Lesage can also be found in the Zander Collection in Cologne.

== Gallery ==
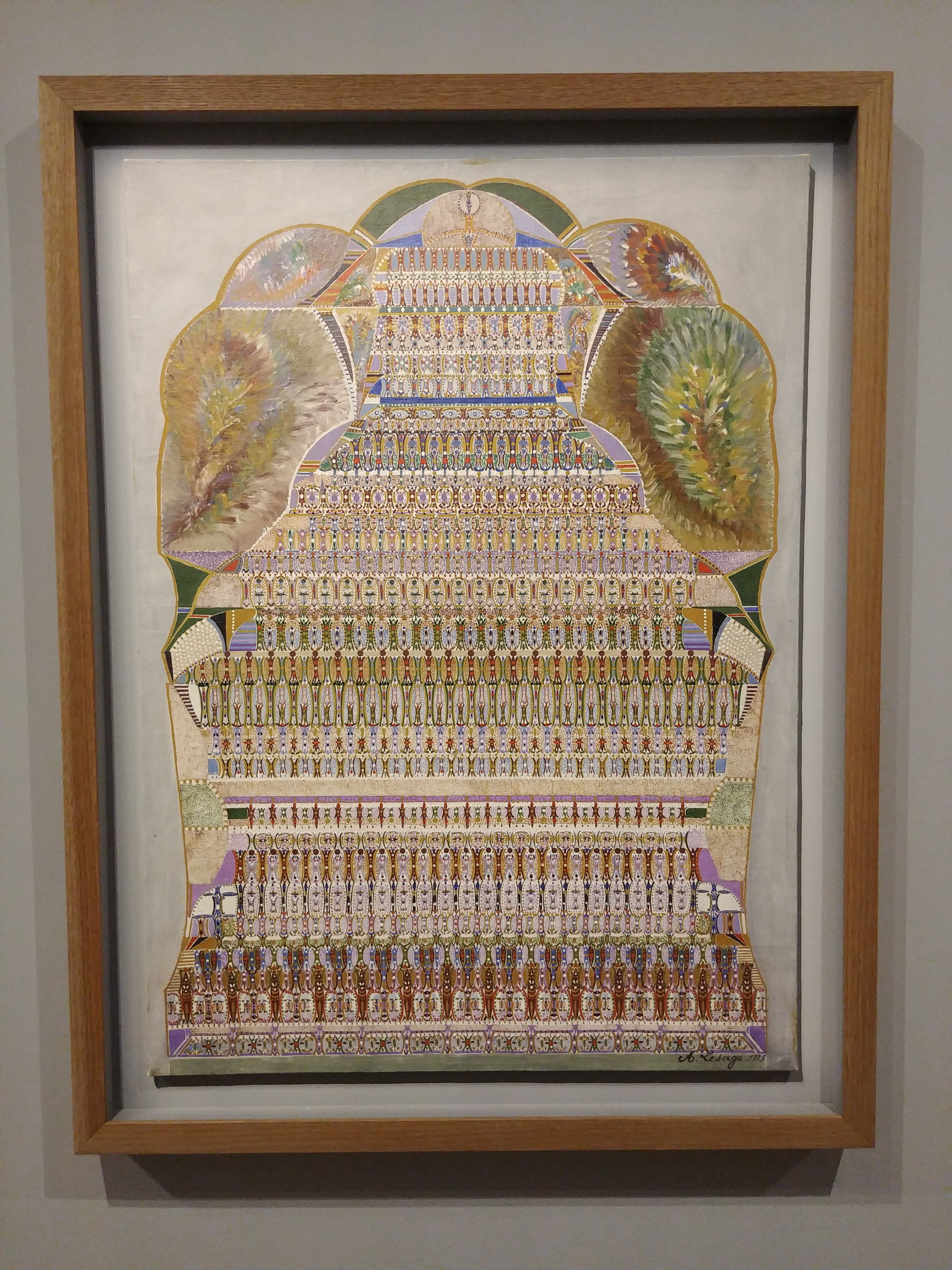

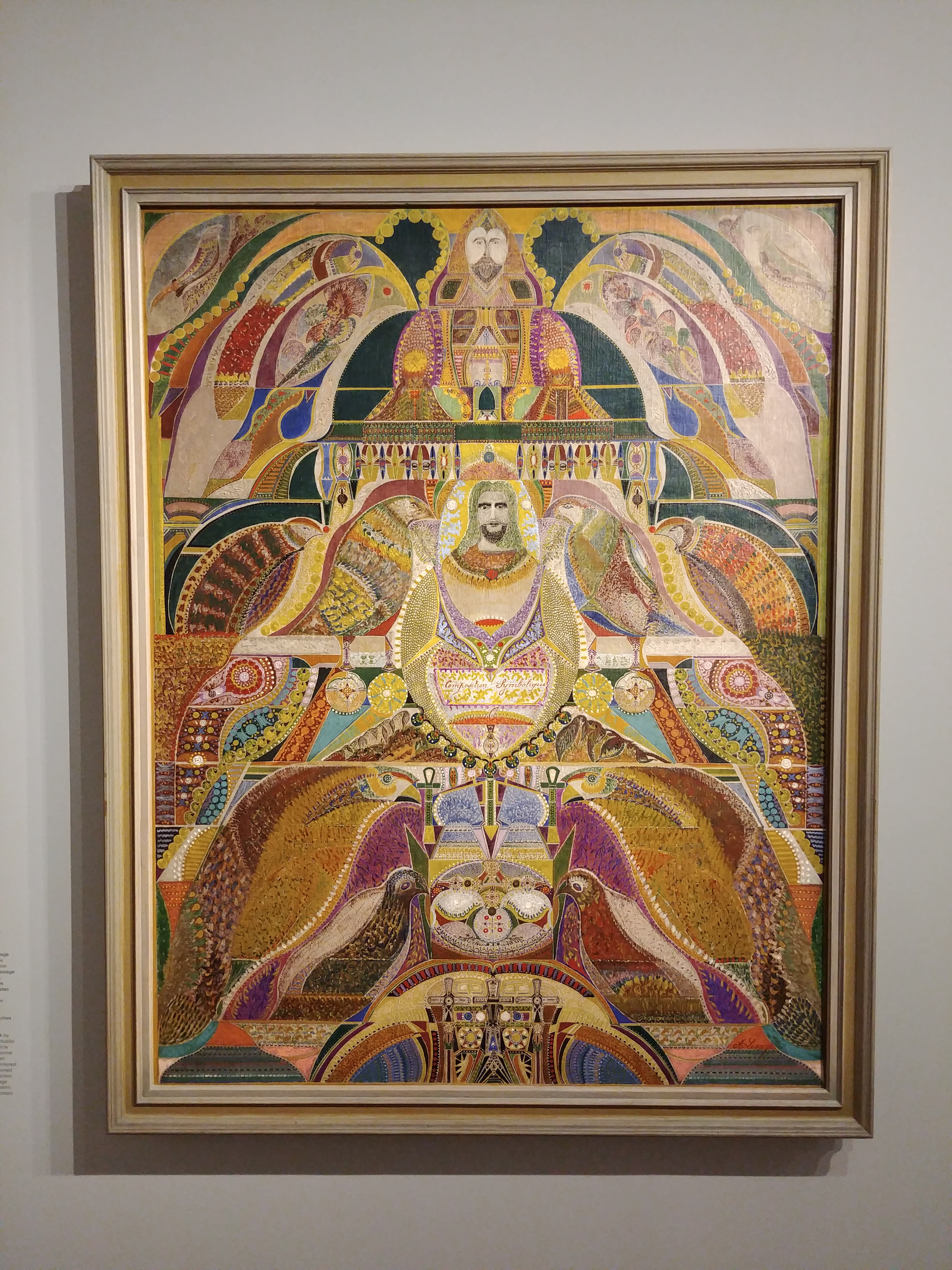

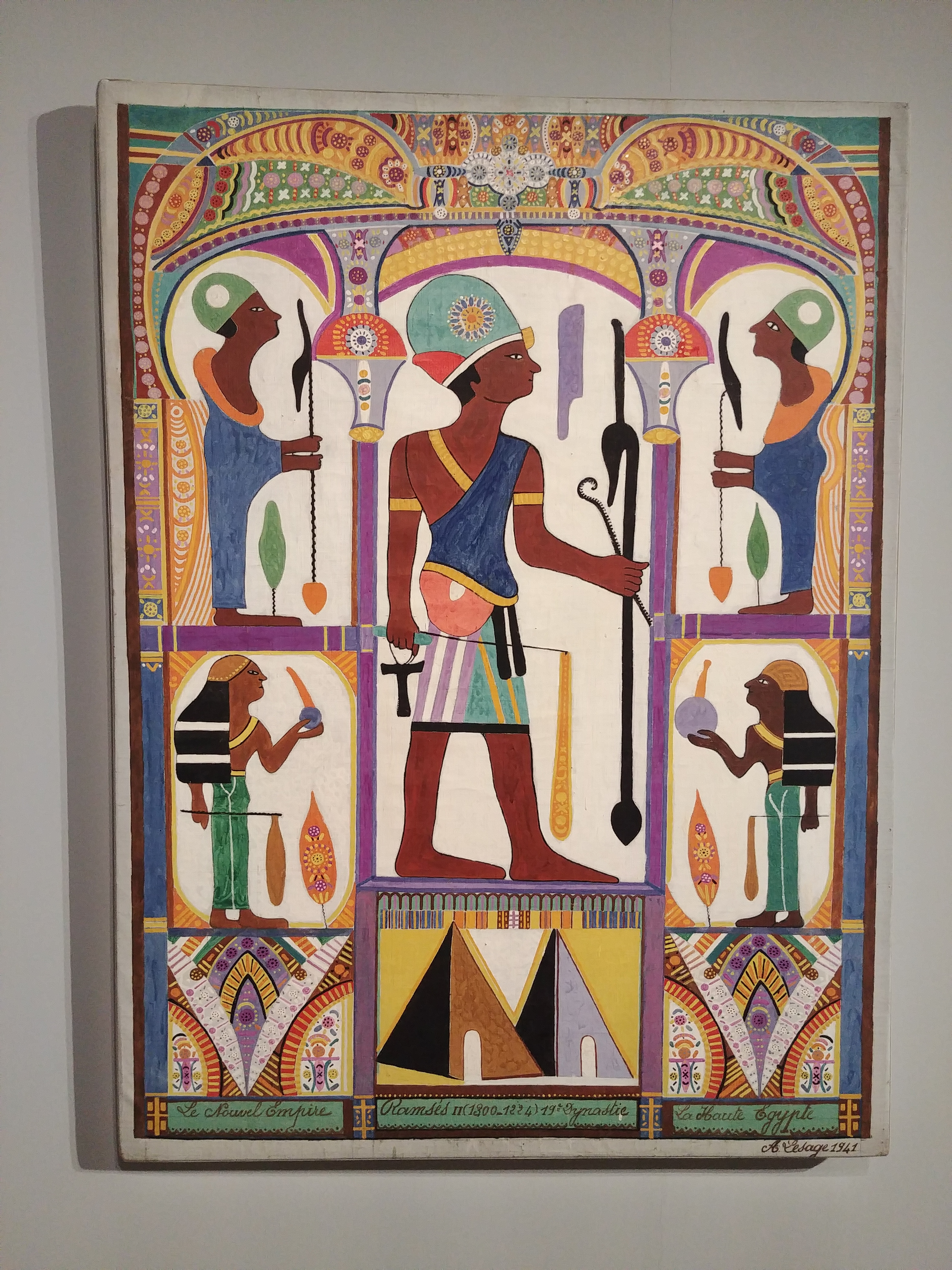

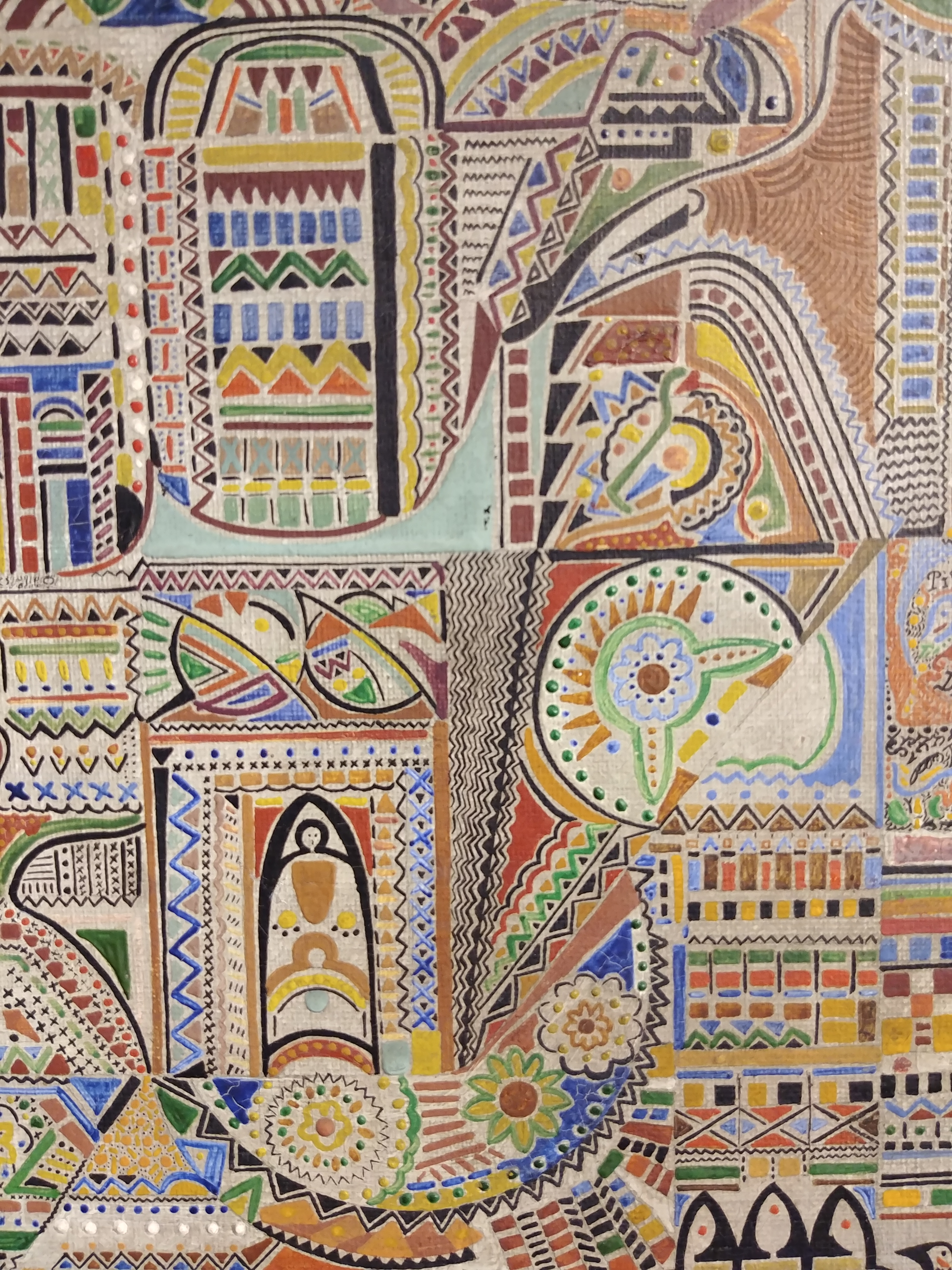

== Bibliography ==
- Collectif Art Brut 3, Art Brut 3, vol. 23, t. 3, Paris, Jean Dubuffet, 1964, 182 p., p. 8-45
- Lucienne Peiry, L'Art Brut, Paris, Flammarion, 1997
- (en) Geneviève Roulin, Raw Vision, vol. 26, Londres, Raw Vision, 1999, p. Augustin Lesage –Raw Classics
- Collectif, Art médiumnique, visionnaire, Messages d’Outre-Monde, Paris, Hoëbeke, 1999 (ISBN 2842300912)

catalogue d'une exposition à la Halle Saint-Pierre

- John Maizels, L’art brut, l’art outsider et au-delà, Paris, Phaidon, 2003
- Collectif, Augustin Lesage et Elmar Trenkwalder, les Inspirés, Paris, Editions Fage, 2008

catalogue d'une exposition à la Maison Rouge

- Zander, Susanne (2023). 26 Artists. Works from the Zander Collection. Cologne: Verlag der Buchhandlung Walther und Franz König, p. 185.
