= Sprimont =

Municipality in Liège Province, Wallonia, Belgium

Sprimont Sprumont (Walloon)
- Municipality
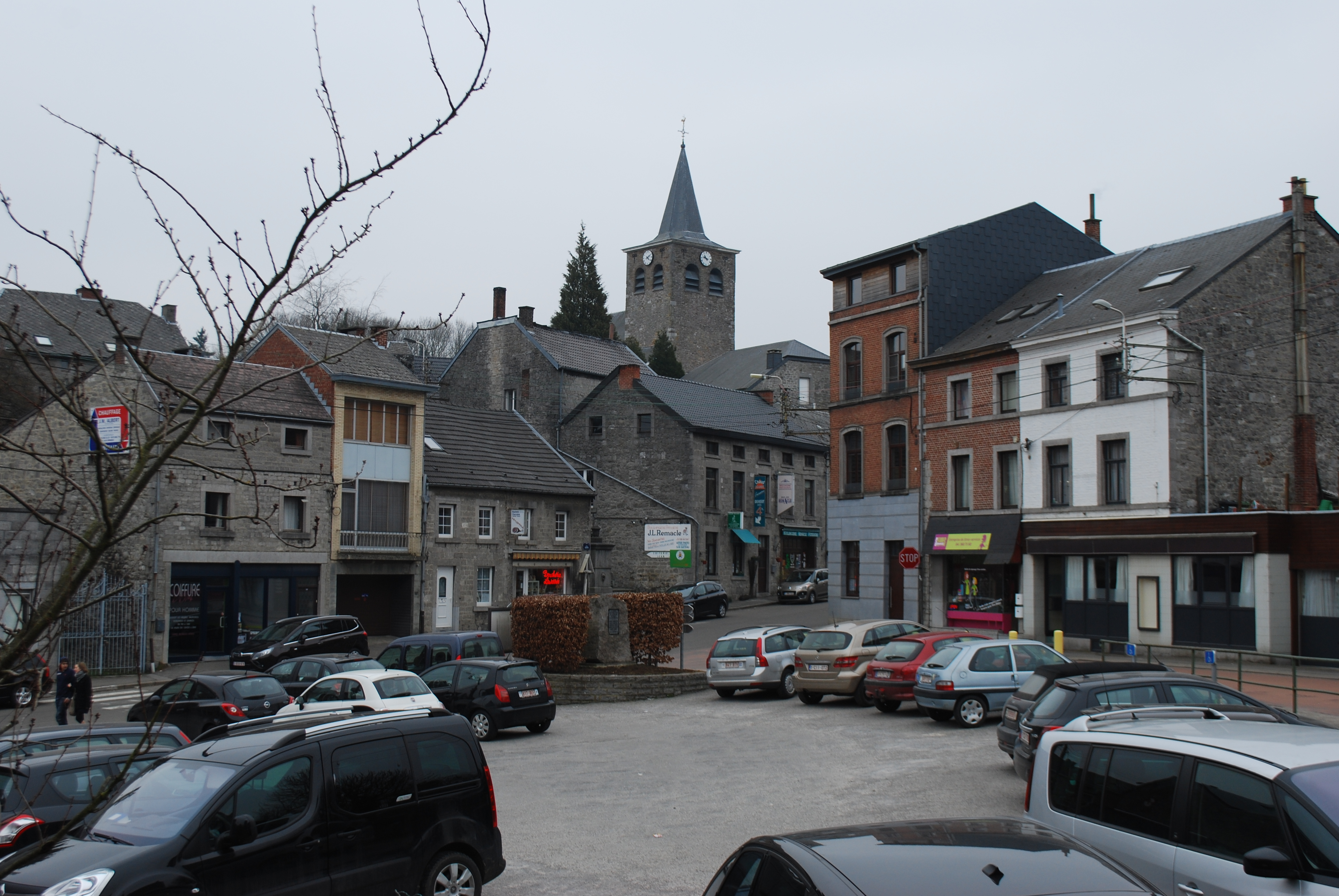

- Flag Coat of arms

- Location of Sprimont in Liège province
- Interactive map of Sprimont
- Location in Belgium
- Coordinates: 50°30′N 05°40′E
- Country: Belgium
- Community: French Community
- Region: Wallonia
- Province: Liège
- Arrondissement: Liège

Government
  - Mayor: Luc Delvaux (EC-CDH-MR)
  - Governing party: EC-CDH-MR

Area
  - Total: 74.46 km^{2} (28.75 sq mi)

Population (2018-01-01)
  - Total: 14,645
  - Density: 196.7/km^{2} (509.4/sq mi)
- Postal codes: 4140, 4141
- NIS code: 62100
- Area codes: 04
- Website: www.sprimont.be

Sprimont (French pronunciation: [spʁimɔ̃]; Walloon: Sprumont) is a municipality of Wallonia located in the province of Liège, Belgium.

The municipality consists of the following districts: Dolembreux, Gomzé-Andoumont, Louveigné, Rouvreux, and Sprimont.

Other villages: Banneux, Damré, Florzé, Lincé, Ogné, Presseux, and Rivage.

On January 1, 2006, Sprimont had a total population of 12,782. The total area is 74.2 square kilometres (28.6 sq mi) which gives a population density of 172 inhabitants/km^{2} (450 inhabitants/sq mi).

== Etymology ==
Sprimont is an ancient name, the earliest written records of which date from 855 and 856 AD. These are located in the Abbey of Stavelot.

The etymology of Sprimont is uncertain. A priori, it seems to be the name of a place; however some historians propose that it may derive from a person's name.

Spellings of Sprimont may be different, depending on (1) the written language, and (2) the time period. Since Sprimont is more than 1,100 years old, a variety of different spellings are to be expected. For example, Ernst cites "Sprismonte" in 888 AD, and Martine & Duraud cite "Sprismont" in 1049. However, since about 1000 AD "Sprimont" seems to be exclusively used. In Bulletin de l'Institute Archeologique Liégeoise (vol. VII), there are further references to the Teutonic Spir-Boum, Spereboum, Sper-Boun and the Frisian Spiri, Spere, Sper, as well as the Latin sorbus. These translate as 'speer', 'hasta,' and 'lance.'

There is a consensus that the root is of a Latin origin. If this is correct, the suffix -mont is probably from mons, montis, meaning either hill or mountain. However, some historians point out that many geographical names with this suffix belong to places not on a hill, some of which are even in valleys. This may cast doubt on the true meaning being "hill", but another source indicates that mons was used in Roman times to indicate a way-station for travellers.

As for the prefix of spri-, more debate is required, as its origin seems to be lost to antiquity. Ancient written documents indicate several possible Latin origins: spiris, spers. Regardless of the meaning of the root word, one must also consider the usage in the context of the name itself. For example, if it does indeed refer to a species of tree or wood, in those ancient times, what was the connotation? It has been argued persuasively that 'spri' means 'lance'.

Concluding the etymology of Sprimont, the active might mean 'Mounted Warrior', whereas the passive might mean 'Lance of Defence'. This is from mont de Spiris.

== Gallery ==
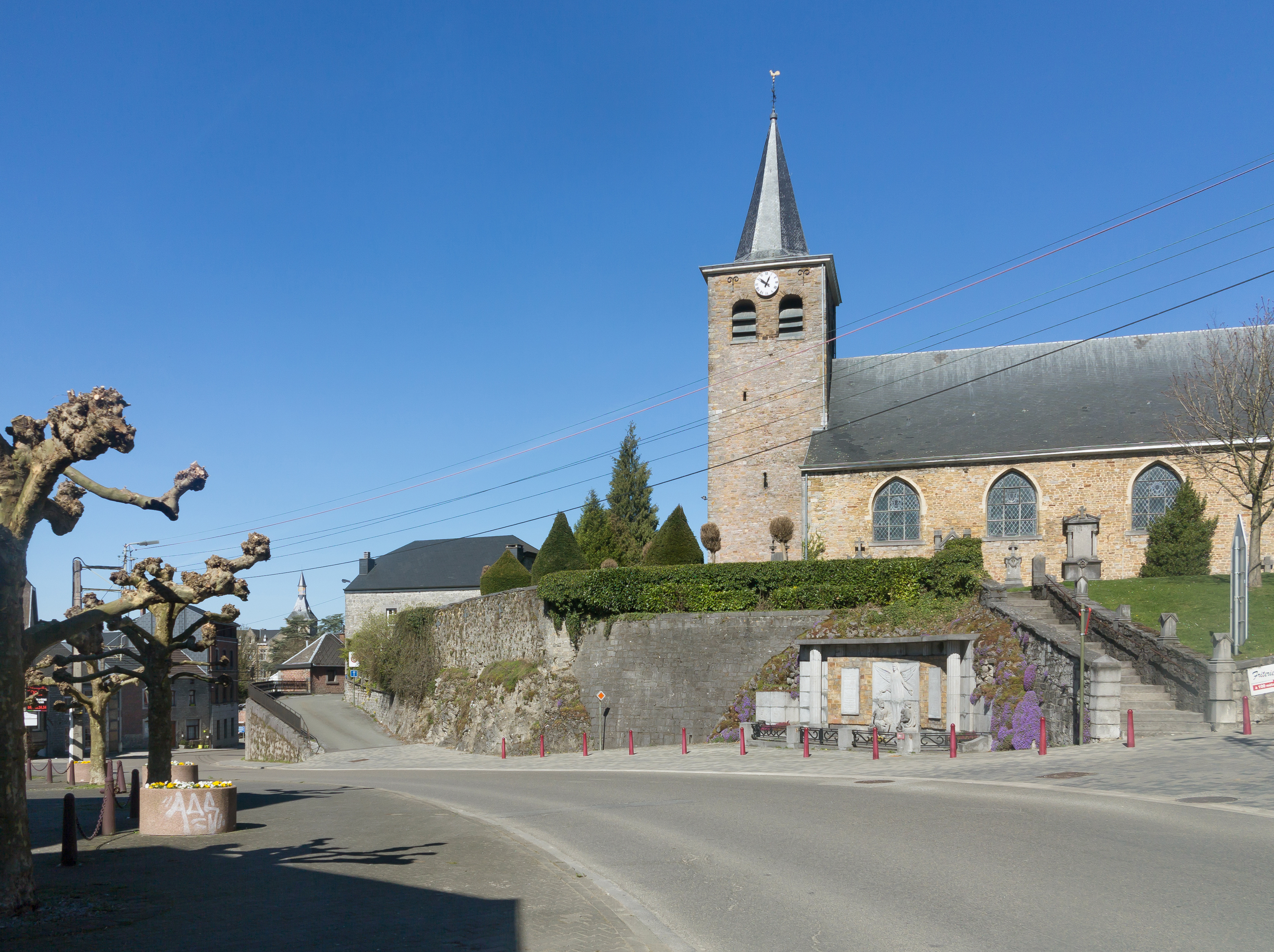
Sprimont, church: l'église Saint Martin

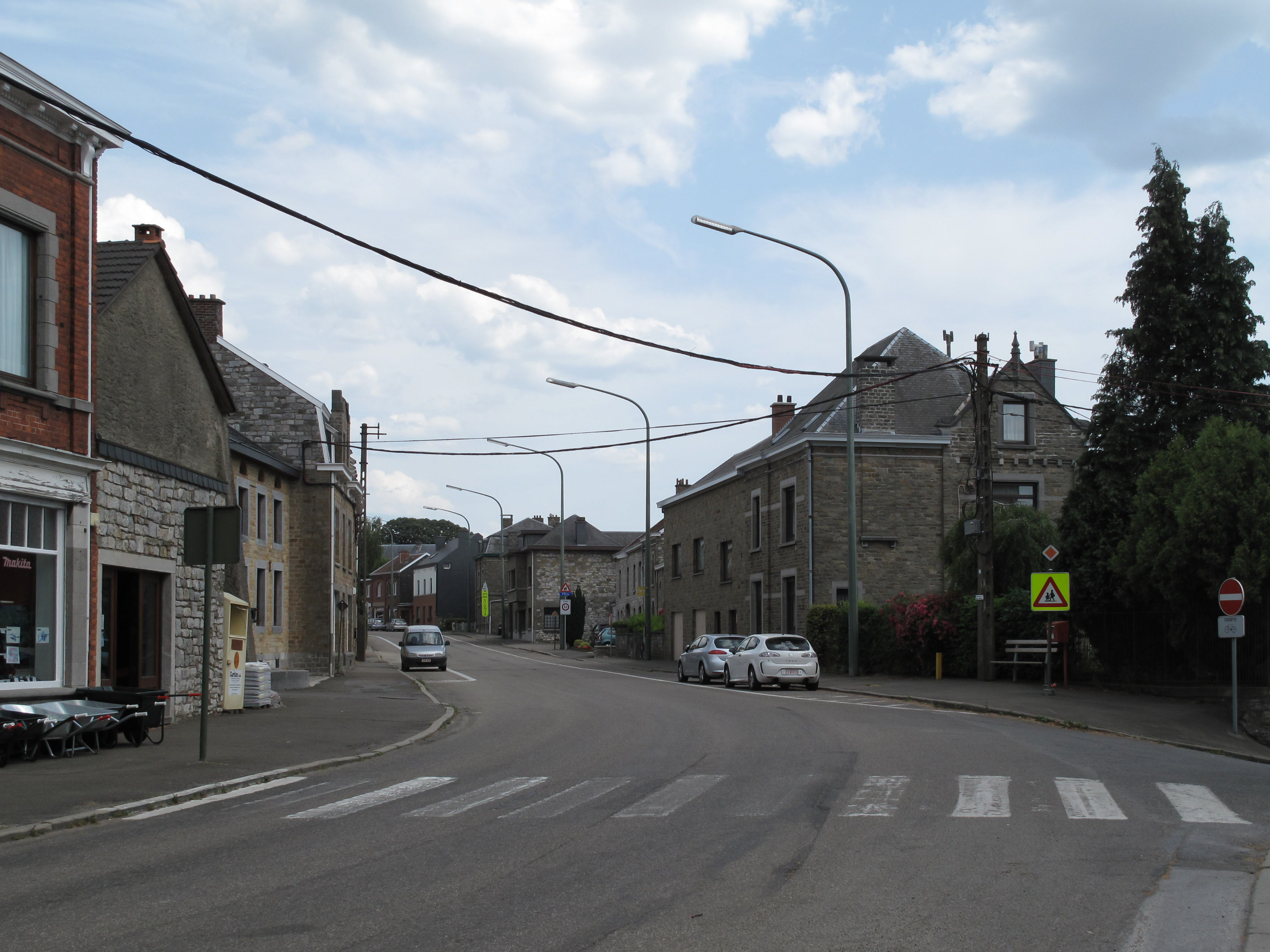
Louveigné, street view

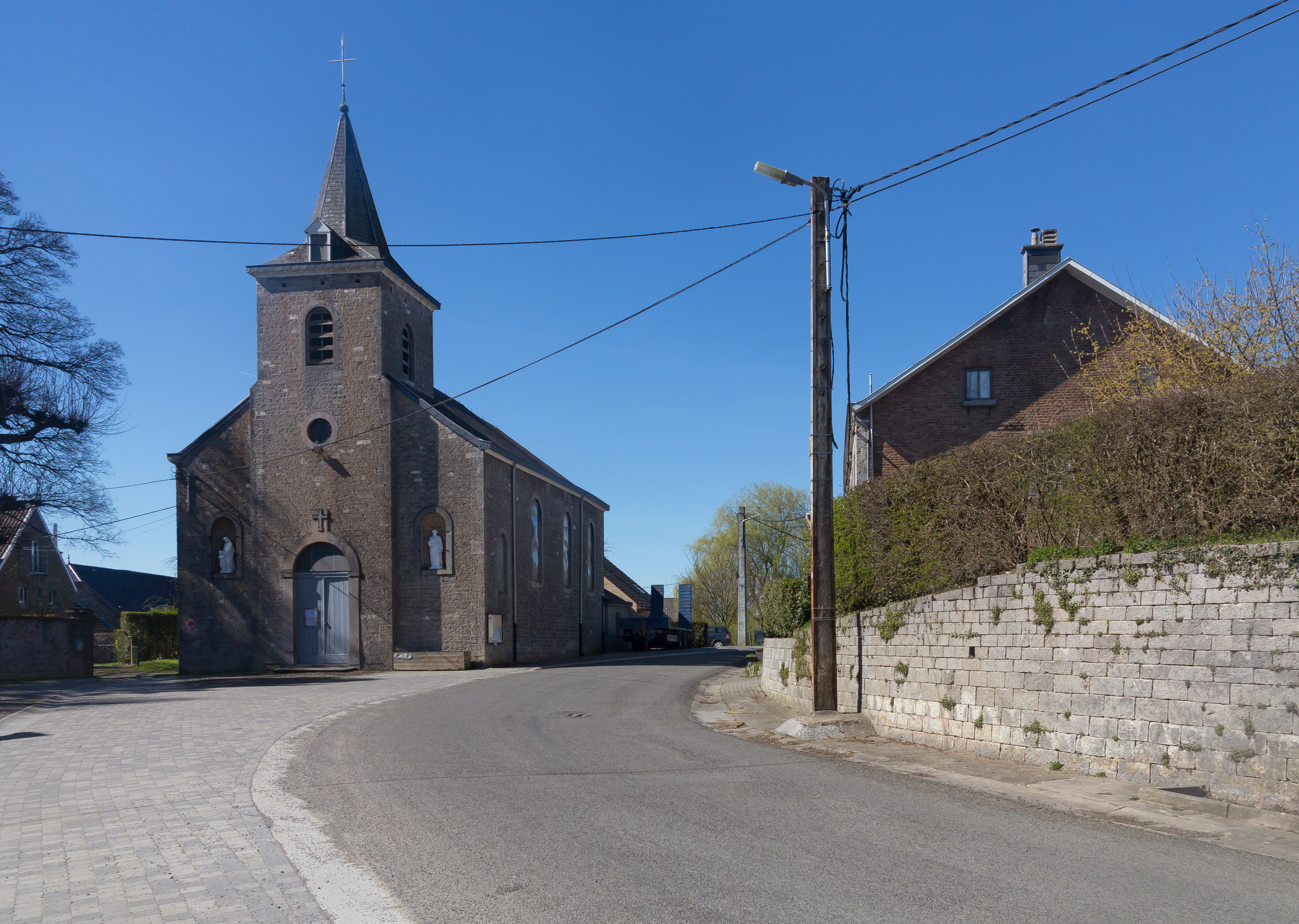
Florzé, church: l'église Saint-Pierre

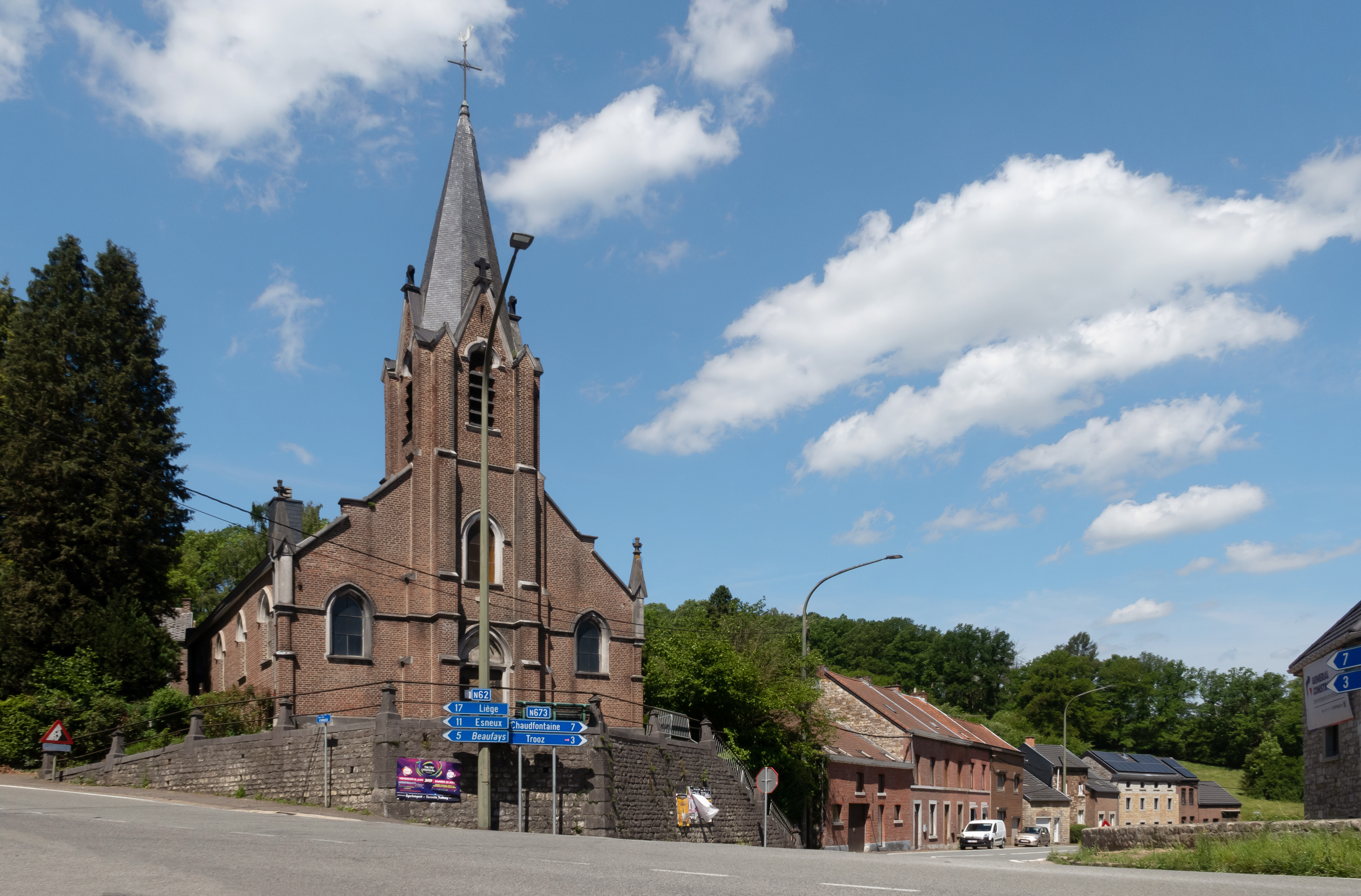
Les Forges, church: la Nativité de la Sainte-Vierge

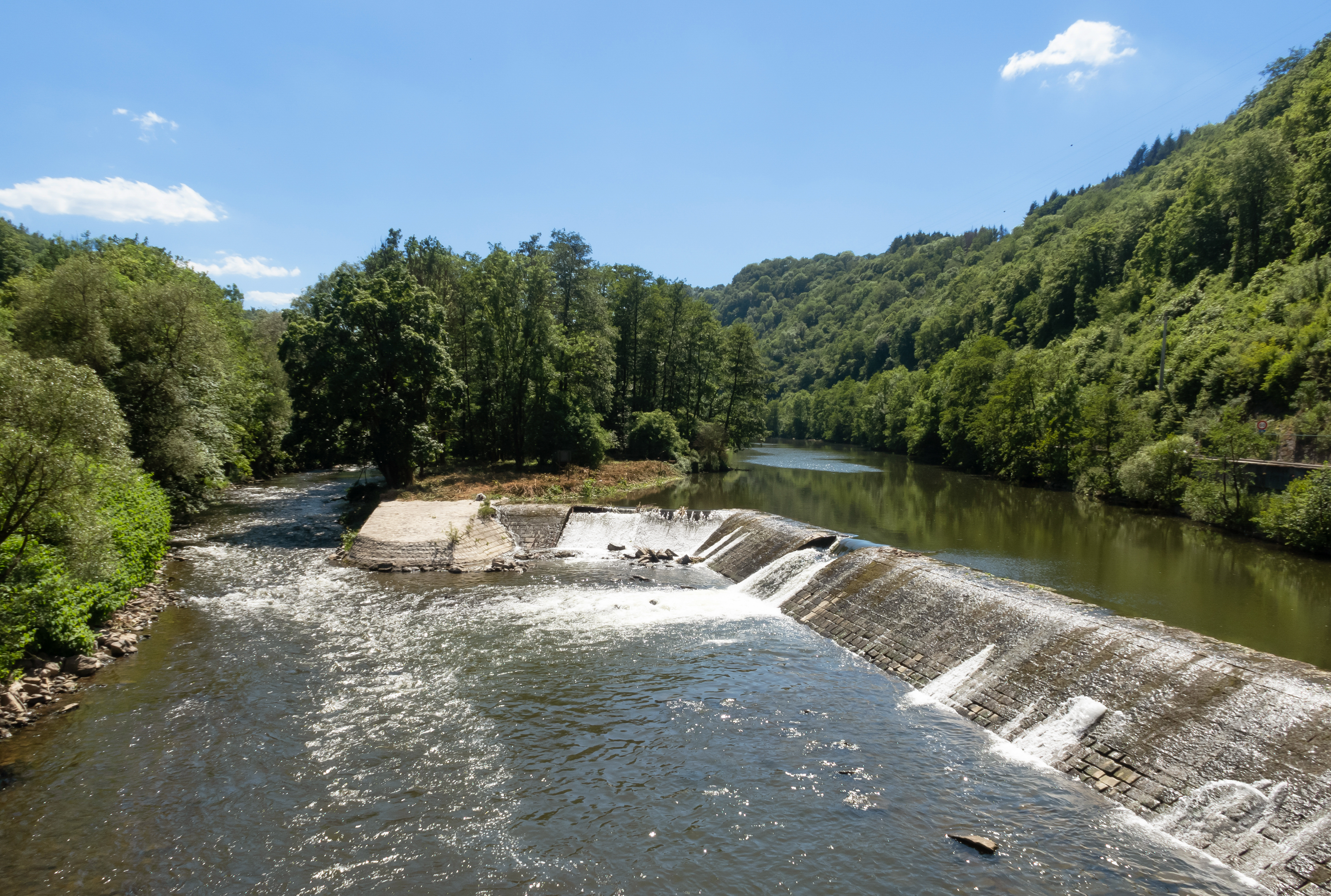
bij Chanxhe, the l'Ourthe

== See also ==
- List of protected heritage sites in Sprimont
