= Rouvreux =

Village in Liège Province, Belgium

Coordinates: 50°29′24″N 5°39′3″E

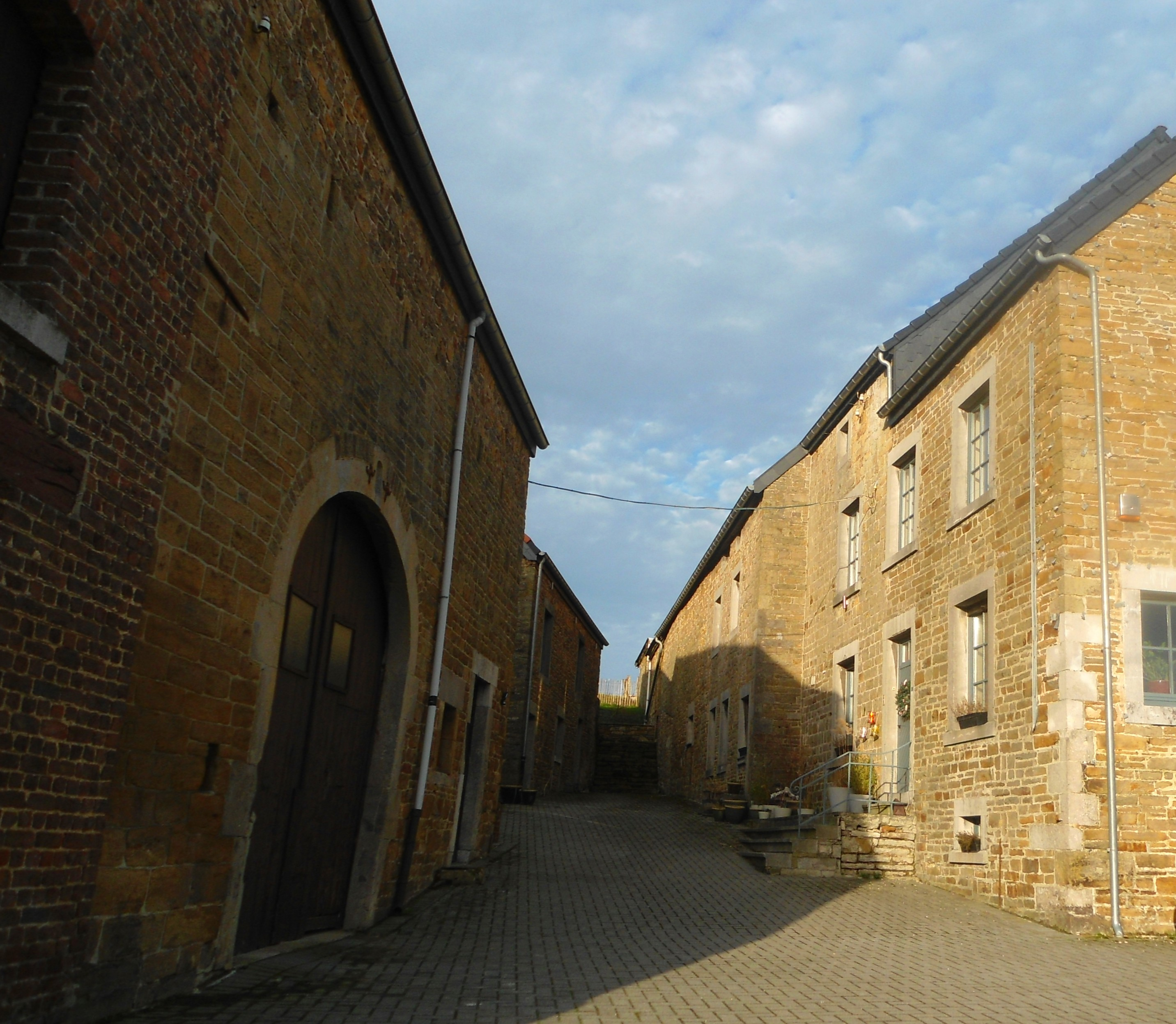
Rouvreux

Rouvreux (French pronunciation: [ʁuvʁø]; Walloon: Rovreu) is a village of Wallonia and a district of the municipality of Sprimont, located in the province of Liège, Belgium.

It is named after the hamlet at its centre and was a municipality of its own from its creation on 21 May 1886 (by the merger of parts of the municipalities of Aywaille and Sprimont) until the merger of municipalities in 1977.
