= Carlo Zinelli =

Italian artist (1916–1974)

Carlo Zinelli (July 2, 1916 – January 27, 1974) was an Italian outsider artist. For most of his life he was affected by schizophrenia.

Zinelli was born in the Italian countryside in the Veneto region. In 1934, when he was 19, he relocated to Verona. In 1939 he volunteered for the Spanish Civil War, where he displayed early symptoms of schizophrenia. He was placed on medical leave after only two months and was exonerated from the military service during World War II. In 1947 he was admitted to the psychiatric hospital in Verona where he spent ten years in almost total isolation.

Zinelli's life took a turn ten years later, when he and twenty other patients were encouraged to take part in a painting workshop established by sculptors Michele Nobile and Pino Castagna and psychiatrist Mario Marini. Set in an atelier, patients were encouraged to paint or sculpt freely. Completely engrossed by his work, Zinelli drew for eight hours a day with tempera paints and colored pencils. This routine seems to have calmed him considerably; clinical evaluations from this time report of his good behavior. By 1964, his work had been exhibited, and he had attracted the attention of art historians associated with Jean Dubuffet and the Compagnie de l'Art Brut.

In 1969, the hospital moved to a new location in Marzana, Italy. Disoriented by the move, Zinelli painted much more infrequently until his death in 1974.

His body of work comprises about nineteen hundred paintings and a few sculptures. The paintings are created on white sheets, and are two-sided from 1962 to 1968. These two-sided works can be seen as continuous, single narratives from one side to the other.

Zinelli used primary colors to tell the story of his childhood in the Italian country side, frequently repeating figures to cover the entire background in a "horror vacui" style. His human figures are always solid shapes drawn in profile, often with holes to represent eyes or other features.

His works are part of the Zander Collection, Cologne, the collection of the LaM – Lille Métropole Musée d'Art moderne, d'Art contemporain et d'Art brut, Lille, the collection of the Museum of Everything, London, the Collection de l’Art Brut, Lausanne and the collection of the Fondazione Culturale Carlo Zinelli, San Giovanni Lupatoto.

== Exhibitions ==
- Art Brut. Dans l’intimité d’une collection. Donation Decharme au Centre Pompidou, Grand Palais, Paris (20.6. – 21.9.2025)
- Carlo Zinelli, American Folk Art Museum, New York (14.3. – 20.8.2017)
- 27 Artists, 209 Works, Zander Collection, Bönnigheim (20.3.2016 – 29.1.2017)
- Carlo Zinelli, Musée International des Arts Modestes, Sète (29.1. – 28.3.04), LaM – Lille Métropole Musée d'Art moderne, d'Art contemporain et d'Art brut, Lille (10.4. – 1.8.05), Musée de l’Abbaye Sainte-Croix, Les Sables-d’Olonne (21.9.05 – 6.1.06)
- Outsider Art. Collection Charlotte Zander, Museum Charlotte Zander, Bönnigheim (19.3. – 3.9.00)
- Carlo Zinelli, Galleria d'Arte Corso Venezia, Mailand (16.6. – 2.7.66)
- Art Brut – Insania Pingens, Kunsthalle Bern, Bern (1963)
- Sono dei veri artisti, Galleria La Cornice, Verona (2.11. – 11.11.1957)
