= Aloïse Corbaz =

Swiss female artist (1886–1964)

Aloïse Blanche Corbaz
- Aloïse Corbaz in 1948
- Born: June 28, 1886; Lausanne, Switzerland
- Died: April 5, 1964 (aged 77); Gimel, Switzerland
- Known for: Drawing
- Movement: Outsider Art

Aloïse Blanche Corbaz (28 June 1886 – 5 April 1964) was a Swiss outsider artist included in Jean Dubuffet's initial collection of psychiatric art. She is one of very few acclaimed female outsider artists.

== Life ==
Aloïse Blanche Corbaz was born in Lausanne, Switzerland in 1886. She earned her baccalauréat in 1906. Although she dreamt of becoming a singer, Aloïse worked as a dressmaker until leaving for Germany in 1911. She eventually found work as a teacher and a governess, in Potsdam, at the court of German Kaiser Wilhelm II. While there, she developed an obsessive romantic passion for the Kaiser. The start of World War I necessitated Aloïse's return to Switzerland. Her imaginary romance with the Kaiser continued, leading to her being diagnosed with schizophrenia and committed to the asylum at Cery-sur-Lausanne in 1918. In 1920 she was moved to an annex of the hospital, la Rosiere a Gimel, where she remained until her death in 1964.

== Work ==
She started drawing and writing poetry in secret c. 1920, but most of her early work has been destroyed. Director of the hospital Hans Steck and general practitioner Jacqueline Porret-Forel first took an interest in her work in 1936, and it was finally discovered by Dubuffet in 1947. He believed Aloïse cured herself by ceasing to fight against her illness, by choosing to cultivate it and make use of it instead.

Her work is erotic, consisting primarily of beautiful women with voluptuous curves and flowing hair attended by lovers in military uniform. She used the vivid colors of crayons, pencils, and flower juice to fill entire sheets of paper. Her compulsion to make marks on every inch of paper is a "horror vacui" remarkably similar to that of Adolf Wölfli.

== Collections and exhibits ==
In 2012 the Collection de l'Art Brut and the Musée cantonal des Beaux-Arts de Lausanne presented a solo exhibition of Aloïse Corbaz's work titled Aloïse. Le Ricochet Solaire.
