= List of people with schizophrenia =

This is a list of people, living or dead, accompanied by verifiable source citations associating them with schizophrenia, either based on their own public statements, or (in the case of dead people only) reported contemporary or posthumous diagnoses of schizophrenia. Remember that schizophrenia is an illness that varies with severity.

Regarding posthumous diagnoses: only a few famous people are believed to have been affected by schizophrenia. Most of these listed have been diagnosed based on evidence in their own writings and contemporaneous accounts by those who knew them. Also, persons prior to the 20th century may have incomplete or speculative diagnoses of schizophrenia. These will not be listed.

== A ==
- Michael Abram – American attempted murderer of George Harrison
- Giorgio Agnelli – Italian member of the Agnelli family
- Süleyman Aktaş – Turkish serial killer known as "The Nailing Killer"
- Lionel Aldridge – American professional football player
- Princess Alice of Battenberg, British princess, mother of Prince Philip and mother in-law of Queen Elizabeth II
- Edward Charles Allaway – American murderer; committed California State University, Fullerton massacre in 1976
- Louis Althusser – French Marxist philosopher*
- John Altoon – American artist
- Audrey Amiss – British artist
- Pere Areny – Andorran convicted murderer, last person executed by Andorra
- Eddie Arning – American outsider artist
- Antonin Artaud – French dramatist, poet, essayist, actor, and theatre director, creator of Theatre of Cruelty
- Nathaniel Ayers – American musician Lil Bober

== B ==
- Parveen Babi – Indian actress and model (alleged)
- Gladys Pearl Baker – American actress Marilyn Monroe's mother
- Joseph Baldi – American serial killer known as The Queens Creeper
- Billy Bang – American violinist and composer
- Roohi Bano – Pakistani actress
- Robert John Bardo – American murderer of actress Rebecca Shaeffer
- Mary Barnes – English artist and writer
- Syd Barrett – English singer and guitarist, member of Pink Floyd (alleged)
- Konstantin Batyushkov – Russian poet of the 19th century
- Benga – British dubstep musician
- Estelle Bennett – American musician, member of The Ronettes
- Marty Bergen – American baseball player and murderer
- Peter Joseph Bis – American homeless man
- Arthur Bispo do Rosário – Brazilian outsider artist (1909–1989)
- Kat Bjelland – American musician, member of Babes in Toyland (schizoaffective disorder)
- Nick Blinko – British painter and punk musician: singer, lyricist and guitarist of Rudimentary Peni (schizoaffective disorder)
- Buddy Bolden – American pioneering jazz musician
- Adrian Borland – English singer-songwriter, member of The Sound (schizoaffective disorder; alleged)
- Clara Bow – American Hollywood flapper actress and "It Girl" of the 1920s
- Rebecca Bradley – American bank robber
- Cheyenne Brando – French fashion model, daughter of Marlon Brando
- Richard Brautigan – American novelist, poet, and short story writer
- Jean "Binta" Breeze (1956–2021), Jamaican dub poet, theatre director, and performer
- Karl Brendel – German outsider artist
- Dorothea Buck – German writer, sculptor, and Holocaust survivor
- Gregory Alan Bush – American mass shooter, perpetrator of the 2018 Jeffersontown shooting

== C ==
- Frank Calloway – American artist
- Jad Capelja – Yugoslavian-born Australian actress
- Tom Cavanagh – American ice hockey player
- Judi Chamberlin – American psychiatric survivors activist and educator
- Bryan Charnley – British artist
- Richard Chase – American serial killer
- James Chasse – American man who died in police custody
- Clarence 13X – American religious leader*
- Camille Claudel – French sculptor
- David Copeland – British terrorist; committed nail bombings in London in 1999
- Aloïse Corbaz – Swiss painter
- Cesare Cremonini – Italian singer-songwriter, member of Lùnapop
- Lupen Crook – English musician (schizoaffective disorder)
- Tivadar Csontváry Kosztka – Hungarian painter
- Izola Curry – American attempted assassin of Martin Luther King Jr.

== D ==
- Richard Dadd – English painter
- Viacheslav Datsik – Russian professional boxer
- Terry A. Davis – American computer programmer and vlogger
- Matthew de Grood – Canadian mass murderer
- Francis E. Dec – Polish-American disbarred lawyer and outsider writer.
- Patricia Deegan – American disability rights advocate
- Princess Deokhye – Korean royal princess
- Randall Gair Doherty – English son of occultist Aleister Crowley
- John du Pont – American millionaire and wrestling coach who murdered wrestler Dave Schultz

== E ==
- Eduard Einstein – Son of physicist Albert Einstein
- Will Elliott – Australian writer
- Roky Erickson – American rock musician, founder of The 13th Floor Elevators
- Ramon Escobar – Salvadoran-American serial killer
- Frederick Exley – American writer

== F ==
- Frances Farmer – American Hollywood actress, varyingly diagnosed with schizophrenia, bipolar psychosis, split personality and depression
- Pavel Fedotov – Russian painter of the 19th century
- Shulamith Firestone – Canadian-American radical feminist activist
- Wild Man Fischer – American musician, diagnosed with paranoid schizophrenia and bipolar disorder
- Zelda Fitzgerald – American wife of writer F. Scott Fitzgerald; writer, dancer and artist
- Erin Fleming – Canadian actress and companion of Groucho Marx
- Janet Frame – New Zealand author
- Jackson C. Frank – American folk musician
- Leonard Roy Frank – American human rights activist
- Frederick Frese – American psychologist

== G ==
- Eugène Gabritschevsky – Russian painter and microbiologist
- Joe Gallo – American mobster
- Ted Gärdestad – Swedish musician (was in Eurovision 1979)
- Theodore Garman – English painter
- Martin Garratt – English professional footballer
- Genain quadruplets – American quadruplets who all developed schizophrenia
- Willem van Genk – Dutch painter and graphic artist
- Jim Gordon – American drummer, member of Derek and the Dominos; killed his mother
- Paul Gösch – German artist and architect
- Peter Green – English singer-songwriter (Fleetwood Mac)
- Joanne Greenberg – American author and anthropologist
- Ken Grimes – American artist

== H ==
- Hamad al-Hajji – Saudi Arabian poet
- Will Hall – American mental health advocate
- Darrell Hammond – American comedian, actor on Saturday Night Live
- Tom Harrell – American jazz trumpeter, flugelhornist, composer, and arranger
- Josef Hassid – Polish violinist
- Donny Hathaway – American soul singer and songwriter
- Michael Hawkins – American actor; diagnosed with schizophrenia and bipolar disorder
- Lord Nicholas Hervey – British aristocrat and political activist
- John Hinckley Jr. – American failed assassin of Ronald Reagan
- Sigrid Hjertén – Swedish painter
- Friedrich Hölderlin – German poet and philosopher
- H.R. – American musician, singer of Bad Brains
- Adèle Hugo – Daughter of French writer Victor Hugo; her story is told in the film The Story of Adele H.
- Stephen Huss – Canadian musician, member of Psyche

== J ==
- Maryam Jameelah – American-Pakistani author*
- Topsy Jane – British actress
- Jill Janus – American vocalist, lead singer for Huntress
- Daniel Johnston – American artist and musician
- Lucia Joyce – Irish professional dancer, daughter of James Joyce and Nora Barnacle

== K ==
- Uuno Kailas – Finnish poet
- Kathy Kirby – English singer
- August Klotz – German outsider artist
- Johann Knüpfer – German outsider artist
- Marij Kogoj – Slovenian composer
- William Kolakoski – American artist and recreational mathematician
- Aaron Kosminski – Polish hairdresser and Jack the Ripper suspect
- William Kurelek – Canadian artist and writer
- Pyotr Kuznetsov – Russian cult leader

== L ==
- Veronica Lake – American Hollywood actress of the 1940s
- Tony LaMadrid – American research study subject
- Michael Laudor – American Yale Law School graduate, subject of a planned Ron Howard movie; later killed his fiancée
- Jakob Lenz – German writer of the Sturm und Drang movement of the 18th century
- Juhan Liiv – Estonian poet
- Jake Lloyd – retired American actor who played Anakin Skywalker in Star Wars: Episode I – The Phantom Menace
- Elfriede Lohse-Wächtler – German avant-garde painter
- Jared Lee Loughner – perpetrator of the 2011 Tucson shooting

== M ==
- Gucci Mane – American musician
- Austin Mardon – Canadian scientist
- Agnes Martin – Canadian American abstract painter
- James Tilly Matthews – British merchant
- Rufus May – British clinical psychologist
- Mary Virginia McCormick – American philanthropist
- Angus McPhee – Scottish outsider artist
- Joe Meek – English record producer and songwriter
- Charles Meryon – French artist
- Mayo Methot – American actress*
- William Chester Minor – A contributor to Oxford English dictionary
- Mario Miranda – Colombian professional boxer
- Peter Moog – German outsider artist
- William Lewis Moore – American civil rights activist
- Anatoly Moskvin – Russian linguist, philologist
- Bob Mosley – American musician, member of Moby Grape
- Audrey Munson – American artist's model and film actress, "America's First Supermodel"

== N ==
- Nadiuska – German model and actress
- John Nash – American economist, mathematician and Nobel Prize winner in Economic Sciences
- August Natterer – German painter
- Émile Nelligan – French Canadian poet
- Neil Nephew – American actor and writer
- Vaslav Nijinsky – Russian ballet dancer, choreographer
- Joseph Ntshongwana – South African rugby player and serial killer

== O ==
- Michael O'Hare – American actor, suffered from paranoid delusions and hallucinations
- John Ogdon – English pianist and composer
- Adnan Oktar – Turkish cult leader and Muslim televangelist
- Ol' Dirty Bastard – American rapper, one of the founding members of the Wu-Tang Clan
- Viktor Orth – outsider artist
- Jeremy Oxley – Australian musician and member of the Sunnyboys

== P ==
- P.O – South Korean rapper, singer and actor
- Bettie Page – American pin-up model
- Michael Peterson – Australian surfer
- Robert M. Pirsig – American writer and philosopher
- Sophie Podolski – Belgian poet and graphic artist
- Franz Pohl – German outsider artist
- Khieu Ponnary – Cambodian first wife of President Pol Pot
- Bud Powell – American jazz pianist
- Marcia Powell – American prisoner who died of hyperthermia after being left in an outdoor cage for four hours

== R ==
- Darren Rainey – American prisoner who died at Dade Correctional Institution after being left in a steaming hot shower for two hours by prison guards
- Martín Ramírez – Mexican-American self-taught artist
- Joey Ramone – lead vocalist of American band Ramones
- Margaret Mary Ray – American stalker of talk show host David Letterman and astronaut Story Musgrave
- Eleanor Riese – American patient and lawsuit plaintiff
- Peter Robbins – American actor and real estate broker, original voice of Charlie Brown
- Royal Robertson – American outsider artist
- John Russell, 4th Earl Russell – British nobleman, son of Bertrand and Dora Russell
- Katherine Routledge – British archaeologist

== S ==
- Elyn Saks – American law professor and schizophrenia writer/researcher
- Hisham al-Sayed – Israeli Hamas hostage
- Lori Schiller – American writer
- Howard Schoenfield – American tennis player
- Daniel Paul Schreber – German judge, writer, and notable patient of Freud
- Ingo Schwichtenberg – German drummer of power metal band Helloween
- Shocka – British rapper and mental health advocate
- Vashishtha Narayan Singh – Indian academic
- Oliver Sipple – American war veteran and intervener in the attempted assassination of Gerald Ford
- Marguerite Sirvins – French textile artist
- Craig Smith – American musician
- Valerie Solanas – American radical feminist who attempted to murder artist Andy Warhol
- Skip Spence – Canadian-born American musician, member of Moby Grape
- Nancy Spungen – American Punk icon and girlfriend of Sex Pistols bassist Sid Vicious
- Sun Hong Rhie – Korean-American astrophysicist

== T ==
- Takashi Tachibana – Japanese social activist and politician
- Talal – King of Jordan (for a year)
- Emmanuel Tardif – Canadian filmmaker; killed his mother
- Kelly Thomas – American citizen who was beaten to death by police, who went unpunished for taking his life.
- Andrew Toles – American baseball player

== U ==
- Maurice Utrillo – French painter*

== V ==
- Lauri Viita – Finnish poet and author
- Mark Vonnegut – American memoirist, pediatrician, son of author Kurt Vonnegut

== W ==
- Louis Wain – British artist
- Walkie – Russian rapper
- Robert Walser – Swiss author, diagnosed with schizophrenia]]
- Aby Warburg – German art historian and cultural theorist, diagnosed with schizophrenia and bipolar disorder
- Butch Warren – American jazz double bassist
- Melvin Way – American folk artist
- Hannah Weiner – American 'clairvoyant' poet
- Robison Wells – American novelist and blogger
- Danniella Westbrook – English actress (EastEnders)
- Karl Maria Wiligut – Austrian SS-general and an occultist
- Ron Willems – Dutch footballer
- Wesley Willis – American musician and artist
- Stefan Wilmont – Polish criminal who assassinated the mayor of Gdańsk in 2019
- Brian Wilson – American musician, singer, songwriter, and record producer who co-founded the Beach Boys (schizoaffective disorder)
- Adolf Wölfli – Swiss painter
- Louis Wolfson – American writer

== Z ==
- David Zancai – Canadian street performer
- Carlo Zinelli – Italian outsider artist
- Unica Zürn – German artist

== See also ==
- List of people with bipolar disorder
- List of people with post-traumatic stress disorder
