= Heinrich Anton Müller =

Swiss painter

Heinrich Anton Müller (22 January 1869, Versailles – 10 May 1930, Münsingen) was a Swiss outsider artist and painter.

== Personal life ==
Müller married a Swiss woman and moved to the canton of Vaud to become a winegrower. While working in wine, he invented and patented a grapevine trimming machine, which would later influence his art.

He registered the patent to the machine with the Federal Copyright Office. But after failing to maintain the patent, others stole the design and exploited it. This led Müller into a deep depression and eventually triggered a breakdown.

== Art ==
Müller was then institutionalized in a Münsingen psychiatric hospital at 37 years old until his death at age 61. In there, he began creating "machines" on hospital grounds that were mostly made of wires, discarded wood, and strips of cloth while being glued together by his own excrements. The machines commonly were wheel-like structures in cages. These works usually depicted Müller's fascination with perpetual motion. They all have since been destroyed, some by his own hand.

His drawings were subjects in Hans Prinzhorn's Artistry of the Mentally Ill. When referencing Müller's work The Dead Young Girl, Prinzhorn said the work had "psychic expressiveness" and "free grotesque play."

== Resources ==
- Hans Prinzhorn, Artistry of the mentally ill: a contribution to the psychology and psychopathology of configuration, translated by Eric von Brockdorff from the second German edition, with an introduction by James L. Foy, (Wien, New York: Springer-Verlag), 1972. ISBN 3-540-05508-8.
- Écrits d’Art Brut. Graphomanes extravagants, Lucienne Peiry, Paris, Le Seuil, 2020. (ISBN 978-2-02-144768-2)
