= Wolfgang Petrick =

German painter (1939–2025)

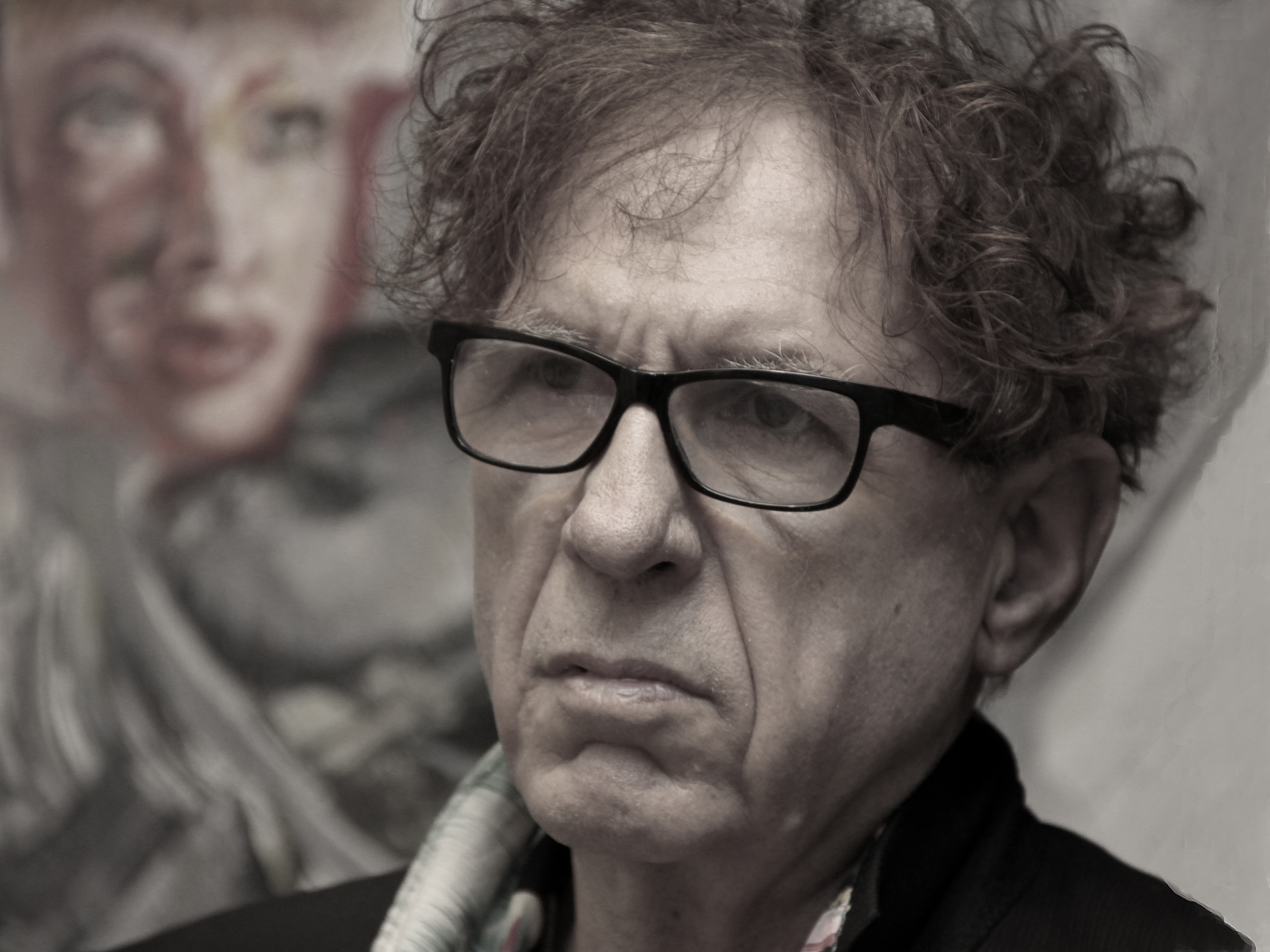
- Petrick in 2015
- Born: 12 January 1839; Berlin, Germany
- Died: 5 December 2025 (aged 86); Berlin, Germany
- Occupations: Painter; Academic teacher
- Organizations: Berlin University of the Arts

Wolfgang Petrick (12 January 1939 – 5 December 2025) was a German painter, graphic artist and sculptor. From 1975 to 2007, he was Professor of Fine Arts at Berlin University of the Arts, now UdK. In addition, and until 2016, he also worked in his New York City studio in Williamsburg, Brooklyn.

Petrick's art reflects the critical realism that was revived in the 1960s; he updated it with dystopian pictorial motifs and installation art.

== Life and career ==
Petrick was born in Berlin on 12 January 1939. He was already painting and drawing when he attended primary school in Ludwigsfelde near Berlin. During his childhood he built terrariums out of broken flat glass and cages for mice, which his mother sold to pet shops. He experienced the bombing of the anti-Hitler coalition on the Genshagen aircraft engine factory with the forced laborers from the Daimler-Benz Genshagen concentration camp, a subcamp of Sachsenhausen, and he observed his neighbor, who was an SS-man with his German Shepherd and who was driving the concentration camp prisoners in their striped clothing to set up anti-tank barriers. In retrosprct, Petrick said that these early experiences had a formative effect on his entire body of work. In 1951, Petrick moved to West-Berlin with his parents and graduated from the Ulrich-von-Hutten-Gymnasium in Berlin-Lichtenrade. As a teenager, he saw firsthand how badly Berlin had been destroyed during the war; he also experienced the tensions of the Cold War.

From 1958, Petrick studied biology at Berlin's Free University (FU Berlin) but moved to the University of Fine Arts (now UdK) in Berlin-Charlottenburg. As a figuratively oriented painter, he first had to emancipate himself in the early 1960s: “from this official ideology of abstract art, the [human] figure was not popular,” is how he described his turn to the art of the New Figuration. Petrick studied with professors Mac Zimmermann, a representative of German surrealism, and with the Bauhaus artist Fritz Kuhr; he completed his training in 1965 as a master student of Werner Volkert.

Against the established marketing strategies of the art trade, Petrick founded at the end of his studies, together with 15 artists such as Hans-Jürgen Diehl, Karl Horst Hödicke, Markus Lüpertz, and Peter Sorge, one of the first independent producers’ galleries in Germany: the Großgörschen 35.

In 1972, and in contrast to U.S. photo- and hyperrealism, he showed, again together with Baehr, Diehl, Sorge, and seven other artists, the art of critical realism in the Gruppe Aspekt. After six years, he distanced himself from the group and developed his own visual worlds that are also reminiscent of “the hellish scenes of the classics Bosch, Breughel (compare The Triumph of Death), and Matthias Grunewald with the crucial difference that today it is not about horror and torment, which are caused by external forces and mythical evil forces, but rather about injuries that people inflict on themselves through their own civilization”: anti-utopias of a near future as multi-layered assemblages and mutated, life-size figures, some of which Petrick locked in glass display cases.

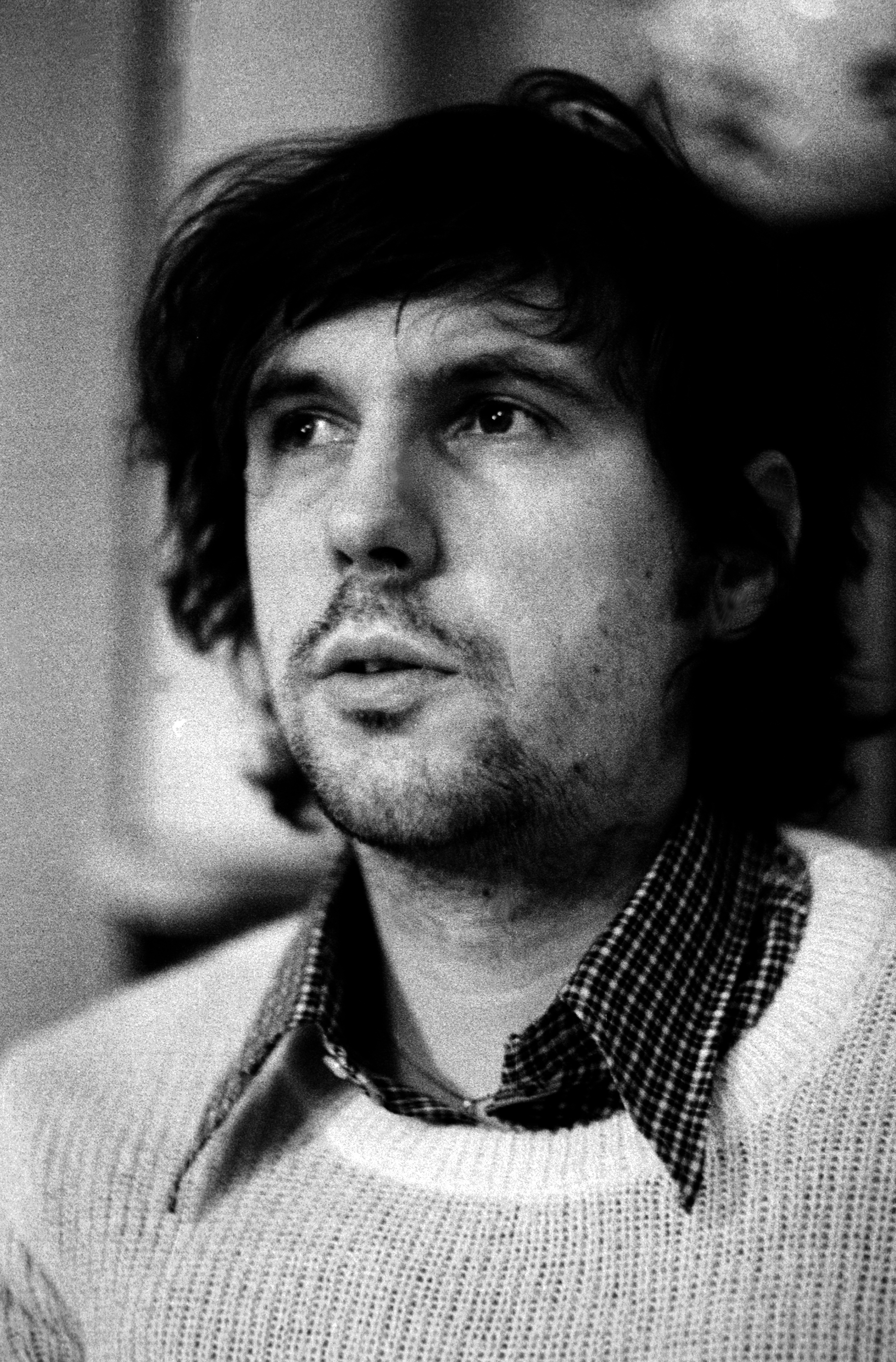
Petrick in 1975

Petrick was a member of the Berlin Academy of Arts from 1993. In addition to teaching at the HdK (UdK), he worked on his own works and in 1978 was part of the photographic series Artists in their Studio by Erika Kiffl; her photography is, among other things, presented by the Museum of Art and Industry Hamburg.

From 1994 onwards, Petrick used his time off from academia to work in his Williamsburg studio in New York City. The Brooklyn address became a contact point for artist friends such as: Jim Dine, James Kalm alias Loren Munk, for some of his Berlin students like Kerstin Roolfs, and for collectors like Arne Glimcher, Robert Cohen, and Dirk Geuer. From this Petrick witnessed the collapse of the Twin Towers of the World Trade Center on September 11, 2001. Five years later, he created his work Big Cell: “A fire engine turns the corner against the laws of perspective: it then comes roughly loose. Painting in fine strokes, color in black and white,” is how art critic Simone Reber describes the picture in Tagesspiegel.

Petrick lived and worked in Berlin. He was married to the artist Helma from 1964; the couple had a daughter, the children's and young adult's author Nina Petrick. His wife died in March 2025.

Petrick died in Berlin on 5 December 2025, at the age of 86, after a long serious illness.

== Artistic development ==
Petrick radically turned away from the pop art movement that emerged in the USA and England in the 1950s. Against the background of his personal experiences in a world ravaged by war and still threatened by it, it did not seem to him to be artistically productive. Instead, he experimented with role models like Richard Lindner, but Petrick found the flash and boldness of American advertising art to be too dominant. Rather, he was influenced by works by Jean Dubuffet, the representative of art brut, and the paintings by James Ensor, a “crosser” of expressionism, surrealism, and his symbolism: “A retrospective about him was my awakening experience,” said Petrick, remembering the Belgian ‘’Painter of Masks’’: “In the 1960s, there was a real sense of optimism.” In his forms of expression, Petrick is connected to the theories of New Objectivity, Carl Gustav Jung's symbolism, and impulses from Art Brut. To do this, he dealt with one of the most extensive collections of art by mentally ill people, the Prinzhorn Collection. The significance of Petrick's work became apparent in 2011 with his participation in the exhibition “From Kirchner to Today. Artists react to the Prinzhorn Collection”.

Petrick explained further artistic influences, the differentiation as a critical realist from other forms of realism in 2004 during an interview in New York City: “the New Objectivity, which was in a certain way part of Dadaism — or other [artists] like Grosz, Dix and maybe Beckmann." Outside [West] Berlin there were different forms of realism that manifested themselves as a reaction to abstraction: "the Nouveau Réalisme in Paris, the Capitalist realism of Gerhard Richter, Sigmar Polke and the Düsseldorf scene, as well as photorealism in California. The critical realists differed from these forms of realism in their skepticism towards cultural excess and the dehumanizing tendency of consumer culture."

For the expression of the faces in his pictures, Petrick initially chose a template “that cannot be surpassed in terms of realism – the ‘’Atlas for Forensic Medicine’’ by the Austrian forensic scientist Otto Prokop, published in 1963 by ‘’VEB Verlag Volk und Gesundheit‘’. Here he found photos of the slain, stabbed and shot. The strangely pale faces of the dead with their staringly open eyes survive in his paintings."

In Petrick's Berlin studio at the Schlesisches Tor, portrait drawings of models were added: mostly women like those from glossy magazines, which, according to Tim Gierig in 1988, were described as "with his equipment of deformed people” dive into apocalyptic worlds: “The weapon and the prosthesis are rigid. Frogmen and vacuum cleaner Amazons enter the stage.” The collision of the organic and the mechanical provokes an eye-catcher, but the robot people rather serve as drastic guideposts through the hell-like circles but on this side of the world.

== Artistic work, perception ==
In 1974, Jens Christian Jensen asked: "Is Petrick's art a cynical rapport, an accusation, an unmasking using the means of the grotesque, a utopian nightmare of a future in which the total machine-like manipulation of the human puts the battered flesh through the meat grinder?" The then director of the Kunsthalle Kiel answered: “It is all this, and it is how one invokes the power of humanity in the merciless distortion of death. And so Petrick's work may achieve what all art wants to achieve: change.”

Eberhard Roters, founding director of the Berlinische Galerie, discussed Petrick's installations in 1977: “The rotting process is the representational principle that determines the effect of Petrick's work. Rarely before has rotting been artistically portrayed with such force. In the thickets of the cities, Petrick crawled into the undergrowth." The museum curator also pointed out Petrick's special symbolism of social decay: "the injured person, the injured human figure, the injured image of humanity. It's about the injuries that people inflict on themselves through the inventions of their own civilization." As the art critic Heinz Ohff put it: "Wolfgang Petrick's pictures don't scream. [...] The images reflect the horror that remains when everything has become quiet again after the scream.”

Alexander Tolnay, director of the Neuer Berliner Kunstverein until 2008, points to the complexity of the impact of Petrick's work: “Although his intense images reveal so many things that are disturbing - globalization, asylum, genetic engineering, economic crises, discipline of mind and body", self-optimization, hopes, longings, fears, impacts, decline – you can only follow them fully if you understand that there is a peculiar charm in everything that is inedible and uncomfortable," or, as Petrick put it: "poetry of the enigmatic stuff that preserve the memory of something that once had meaning for people”.

Jürgen Schilling, art historian and former director of the German Academy Villa Massimo, Rome, looks at the work created up to 2006: “Wolfgang Petrick's work could never be validly classified; all attempts to assign him to current groups failed. His most recent works prove that, guided by aesthetic curiosity, he is constantly working on new concepts in order to further develop his autonomous art." About Petrick's exhibition at the Sara Asperger Gallery in 2009, which also presented works from his analysis of ‘’9/11‘’ Jens Pepper wrote in the Tagesspiegel under the title “Goddess of the Firefighters”: “They are apocalyptic-seeming visions of a society in upheaval or decay. Snapshots from New York, edited on the computer and printed out, served as the basis for classically drawn spatial structures, graffiti elements and figures that overlay and condense the original motifs. [...] an extraordinary draftsman, painter, sculptor and graphic artist who knows how to stage his ideas and engagement with the present in a powerful visual way. To this day, his style has remained completely independent of fashion, which makes him one of the most exciting artists of his generation in Germany.” In Petrick's sculptures, his distorting anamorphoses, New York fire engines from September 11 pick up speed, race in circles of mirrored cylinders, showing their use in apocalyptic carousels. Petrick headlines ‘’Go(o)d Speed’’, when perspectives dissolve and only form in the only desired angle. In 2017, Simone Reber wrote about the exhibition of the same name at Max Liebermann-House, Berlin, about the image worlds charged with distortions and deformations under the title “Human — Zombie”: “For example Adam and Eve". With Wolfgang Petrick they are revenants with timid corpse-smiles. Equipped with breastplates and pistols, they have long since lost their innocence. Petrick's images are created in layers. He photographs, draws, paints, scans the intermediate result, edits it further, cuts the canvas, patches it, mounts objects into it, until the creativity is swallowed up by the destruction.” The aggression of the people affected by the consequences of the Second World War, the Vietnam War, up to the time marked by the wars in the collapsed Yugoslavia, are preserved in Petrick's montages to this day: hypodermic syringes and hairdresser's caps, diving goggles, armored vests, Colt Single Action Army worn by chimeras, by Amazons, on battlefields and with the heads of the enemies on theirs hips. “Gas masks, boots, rifles and surgical cutlery are objects that appear again and again in his work and have found their way into his sculptures as real objects,” says cultural journalist Matthias Reichelt for ND.

In May 2022, on the occasion of the retrospective of over six decades of Petrick 's work, Rik Reinking as an art collector and curator, questioned the relevance of these works in times of pandemic, Russian invasion of Ukraine, and the impending shortage of raw materials. He referred to the upheavals that society is once again exposed to. Arne Rautenberg wrote about the extensive exhibition at the Reinbeker Wood Art Institute, (Sammlung Reinking, under the title ‘’Skinning and Images of Suffering — An Approach to the Work of Wolfgang Petrick’’: There is “no chichi, no wishy-washy, no heiti-teiti — this is where all disaster is looked directly in the eye. By the gift of drawing, the present is penetrated in an X-ray-like manner – the depths of human triumph and failure become visible: man in his sketchiness, even fleetingness. Don't trust an idyll, never!" Under the heading ‘’The riddles of the living’’, the former president of the Academy of Fine Arts Nuremberg Karlheinz Lüdeking, commented on the exhibition comprising over 250 exhibits: "In the chronicles of modern art, Wolfgang Petrick mostly classified under the rubric of “critical realism”. [...] As is well known, the term ‘’realism’’ can also encompass many other things, but today, in view of the images from Ukraine, the so-called neorealismo of Italian post-war films in particular deserves renewed attention. In Roberto Rossellini's film ‘’Germany, Year Zero’’, a boy around the age of twelve wanders through the ruins of Berlin until he finally jumps to his death from the fourth floor of a bombed-out apartment building. [...] Against the background of the war experience, Petrick's work appears in a new light. You suddenly see a constant confrontation with the contrast between the living and the dead, [...] how human, animal and plant bodies unite and fight each other in all sorts of hybrid connections on the surface, with injuries and wounds constantly occurring, but... also to metamorphoses, mutations and metastases that extend into space. Fictional characters want to escape from the showcases in which they are locked up in order to penetrate the world in which we ourselves have established ourselves. The silent relentlessness with which the growths of life assert themselves dominates even at the molecular level, where threads and fibers and tendons and veins connect in webs, in fatty tissue, epidermis, hair.”

Petrick wanted to “show the viewer a state of change and deformation” and wanted to create poetic but also “inedible images and installations” that were not easy to consume. “The collector Harald Falckenberg once said that we all still have the war in us,” Petrick quoted him: “My toys were burnt-out bazookas, rusty knives and stuff like that,” he says of his childhood. “I took pictures like that with anger, it also had something liberating,” he says looking back, and since Russia's attack on Ukraine he has been dreaming of war again. Nightmarish fades and combinations play a central role in Petrick's scenarios. “My life has always had such strange superpositions. And that's how I still paint.”

Petrick's work focuses on painting, drawing and printmaking, and he also used his own photographs for his sculptures. He edited them using copiers, projections or scanners, put their metamorphoses together into collages or inserted them directly into his objects. He listened to music from the Neue Deutsche Härte and late works by Beethoven: “Our existence is no longer linear,” said Petrick.

Occasionally Petrick's drawings and etchings appear as illustrations in books; including for Bora Ćosić in ‘’Alaska! Poems for Lida’’ and Hans Christoph Buch's ‘’Monrovia, mon amour – a journey into the heart of darkness’’. In 1973 and 1974, he worked as a set designer at the ‘’Berlin Forum Theater’’ for the production ‘’Trotsky in Coyoacán’’ and texts by August Stramm.

== Exhibitions (selection) ==
=== Solo exhibitions ===
- 2022/23 Retrospective Wolfgang Petrick – Woods Art Institut, Reinbek
- 2017 Go(o)d Speed – Haus Liebermann, Berlin
- 2016 Miracle mirror – Interventions – Space for Young Art, Herzog Anton Ulrich Museum, Braunschweig
- 2016 Protection – Kunstverein Buchholz/Nordheide
- 2016 Broken Home – Carpentier Gallery Berlin (with Roger Ballen)
- 2013 Turbulence – Gallery Geuer and Breckner, Düsseldorf
- 2013 Ludwig in Leipzig V – Museum of Fine Arts Leipzig
- 2013 Turbulence – Gallery of the City of Sindelfingen
- 2012 Alpha – Geuer and Breckner Gallery, Düsseldorf
- 2012 Turbulence – Dominican Church, Osnabrück
- 2012 Turbulence – Kunsthalle Dominikanerkirche, Osnabrück
- 2010/11 P(R)unk – Falckenberg Collection, Phoenix-Hallen, Hamburg-Harburg
- 2010 Uwe Lausen / Wolfgang Petrick – Falckenberg Collection, Deichtorhallen, Hamburg
- 2010 Wolfgang Petrick – Gallery Poll, Berlin
- 2009 Wolfgang Petrick – Sara Asperger Gallery, Berlin
- 2008 Mutatio – Sara Asperger Gallery, Berlin
- 2008 Wolfgang Petrick Graphica – Galeria Litera Prague
- 2007 Pictures and drawings 1965 to 1987 - Gallery Eva Poll, Berlin
- 2007 Sabina Grzimek and Wolfgang Petrick – Gallery Eva Poll, Berlin
- 2006 Good Slave, Bad Master – Gallery Michael Schultz, Berlin
- 2004 Terminal Moraine II – Pepperprojects, Berlin
- 2004 Nest building – Zehdenick Monastery Gallery, Academy of Arts, Brandenburg
- 2003 Monrovia Mon Amour, Book and Material - Literaturhaus Berlin (with Hans Christoph Buch)
- 2003 Folk Dance, portfolio – printing workshop, Künstlerhaus Bethanien, Berlin
- 2003 Folk Dance – Gallery Dieda, Art Bug, Bassano del Grappa, Italy
- 2002 Folk Dance – Farrel-Pollack Fine Art, New York City, USA
- 2001 Battery 2 - Villa Haiss Museum for Contemporary Art, Zell am Harmersbach
- 2000 Seeing and Thinking 8 - Academy of Arts, Berlin
- 1999 Painting and Material – House on Lützowplatz, Berlin
- 1999 Glass House – Gallery Inga Kondeyne, Berlin
- 1997 Gallery Inga Kondeyne, Berlin
- 1996 Tjuvkopplingar – Gothenburg's Konstmuseum, Gothenburg, Sweden
- 1996 Vizivárosi Galéria, Budapest, Hungary
- 1995 Narziß – Gallery Raab, Berlin
- 1995 Prints from the 60s to 90s - Pepper and Patzschke, Berlin
- 1994 Festival III Art and Violence – Dresden Hellerau
- 1992 Gallery Asperger, Strasbourg, France
- 1990 Kampnagel in the Kunsthalle Hamburg
- 1989 Leap through the Sun - Villa Merkel, Gallery of the City of Esslingen
- 1988 Gallery Gierig, Frankfurt am Main
- 1988 Gallery Niepel, Düsseldorf
- 1987 Gallery Brusberg, Berlin (with Bernhard Heisig and Lawrence Weiner)
- 1986 Gallery Hermeyer, Munich
- 1986 Gallery Asperger and Bischof, Chicago, USA
- 1985 Gallery Brusberg, Berlin
- 1985 Gallery Poll, Berlin
- 1984 Gallery Hermeyer, Munich
- 1984 Kunstverein Pforzheim (with Thomas Lange)
- 1983 Nassau Art Association Wiesbaden
- 1983 Gallery Niepel, Düsseldorf
- 1981 Gallery Brusberg, Hanover (with Michael Schoenholtz)
- 1979 New Berlin Art Association in the Staatliche Kunsthalle, Berlin
- 1978 Gallery Poll, Berlin
- 1977 documenta 6, Kassel
- 1976 Kunsthalle Kiel, Kiel
- 1976 Gallery Brusberg, Hanover
- 1975 New Gallery / Ludwig Collection, Aachen
- 1975 Gothenburg Art Gallery, Sweden
- 1974 Gallery Poll, Berlin
- 1973 Gallery Brusberg, Hanover
- 1972 Gallery Poll, Berlin
- 1971 Art Association for the Rhineland and Westphalia, Düsseldorf (with Hans-Jürgen Diehl)
- 1971 Gallery Regio, Lörrach
- 1970 Gallery Brusberg, Hanover (with Werner Berges, Hans-Jürgen Diehl, Peter Sorge)
- 1969 Gallery Niepel, Düsseldorf
- 1969 Gallery Poll, Berlin
- 1969 Haus am Waldsee, Berlin (with Werner Berges, Hans-Jürgen Diehl, Peter Sorge)
- 1966 Gallery Tobias und Silex, Cologne (with Ulrich Baehr and Peter Sorge)
- 1964 Producers' Gallery Großgörschen 35, Berlin
- 1963 Gallery Kress, Munich
- 1963 Gallery Ostentor (with Hans-Jürgen Diehl)

=== Group exhibitions ===
- 2023/24 Homo Ludens - About the game of art - Woods Art Institute, Reinbek
- 2023 Time Ghosts – Inselgalerie Berlin (including Hans-Jürgen Diehl, Ter Hell, Mechthild Schmidt-Feist, Angela Zumpe
- 2023 Hailing frequencies open, sir! – Uhura Basement, Berlin (including Erik Schmidt, Markus Steinweg, Ivonne Thein)
- 2023 Wolfgang Petrick, Ulrich Reimkasten, Mathias Roloff – Feinart Gallery Berlin
- 2022 Aktionale IV – Association of Berlin Artists, Berlin (including Herbert Achternbusch, Peter Schnurbader, Heike Ruschmeyer)
- 2020 Dreams of the Real – Jutta and Manfred Heinrich Art Collection
- 2018/19 30 years of the Starke Foundation – Löwenpalais, Starke Foundation Berlin
- 2018/19 AffenTheater – Forum Art Rottweil
- 2018/19 The 1960s & 1970s in Berlin: Albert, Kraemer, Lange, Petrick, Sorge - Poll Berlin
- 2017 Gold Money Luxury Human – Kunsthaus sans titre, Potsdam
- 2017 Trespassing – Gallery affenfaust, Hamburg
- 2017 Viajando Pelo Mundo, Arte Da Alemanha – Paço Imperial, Rio de Janeiro, Brazil
- 2016 The Academy of Arts, Berlin. Visiting the Chemnitz Art Collections – Chemnitz Art Collections
- 2016 Back to the Future – Kunsthalle am Hamburger Platz, Berlin
- 2016 Traveling the World, Art from Germany – Busan Museum of Art, Busan, South Korea
- 2015 Small Faces, Large Sizes – Elgiz Museum of Contemporary Art, Istanbul, Turkey
- 2015 The Successful Ones – Poll Art Foundation, Berlin
- 2015 Crime Art – Wolfsburg Art Association, Wolfsburg
- 2015 Treasures from Private Ownership II – Pforzheim Gallery
- 2014 World Tour – Krasnoyarsk Museum Center, Krasnoyarsk, Russia
- 2014 Beyond Melancholia, Reinking Collection – Museum of Ethnology, Hamburg
- 2014 Survivors – Löwenpalais, Starke Foundation, Berlin
- 2014 Grossgörschen 35 – House at Kleistpark, Berlin
- 2014 Existential Image Worlds, Reinking Collection – Weserburg Museum for Modern Art, Bremen
- 2013 world trip. Art from Germany On the Move – Center for Art and Media (ZKM), Karlsruhe
- 2013 On The Road – Gallery Geuer and Breckner, Düsseldorf
- 2013 On The Road – Museum of Fine Arts, Leipzig
- 2012 New beginnings of realism. The new reality in images after 1968 – Kunsthalle Vogelmann, Heilbronn
- 2012 Berlin draws! – Kiel City Gallery
- 2011 Physical art, artificial bodies, bodies – Kunsthalle Dominikanerkirche Osnabrück
- 2011 From Kirchner to today. Artists react to the Prinzhorn Collection – Prinzhorn Collection, Heidelberg
- 2011 Berlin draws! – Art foyer of the Bavarian Insurance Chamber, Munich
- 2011 Berlin draws! – Kunsthalle Dominican Church Osnabrück
- 2010 The Painting of Disaster – Lipanjepuntin Trieste, Italy
- 2010 Source/Resource – Wilde Gallery, Berlin
- 2010 Breakthrough! 20 Years After German Unification - First Amendment Center, Nashville, TN - also The Aspen Institute, Aspen, CO - also Pepco's Edison Place Gallery, Washington, DC - also University of Texas San Antonio Art Gallery, San Antonio, TX, USA
- 2010 Berlin draws! – Deutschherrenhaus, Ludwig Museum Koblenz
- 2009 20 Years After the Fall of the Wall, Critical Perspectives of Berlin Artists – Washington DC, USA
- 2009 Impressions of contemporary art in Berlin - Museum of Contemporary Art Skopje, Macedonia
- 2009 awarded/drawn/drawn – Academy of Arts, Berlin
- 2005 Großgörschen 35 / A piece of West Berlin 1964 to 1968 - Gallery Eva Poll, Berlin
- 2005 Deep Action, Wolfgang Petrick and master students 1975 to 2005 – Choson University Art Museum, Gwangju, South Korea
- 2008 Pop and its consequences – Museum Ratingen
- 2008 Jump in Time – Gallery Brusberg, Berlin
- 2008 Around 1968 – Gallery Poll, Berlin
- 2007 25 years of Brusberg Berlin – Gallery Brusberg, Berlin
- 2007 L'Homme-paysage – Villa Oppenheim, Berlin
- 2005 40 Plus / Minus Großgörschen 35 – Gallery Poll, Berlin
- 2005 Paintings and graphics – Sprengel Museum Hanover
- 2005 Professors of the Faculty of Fine Arts – Berlinische Gallery, Berlin
- 2005 Deep Action – Wolfgang Petrick and master students 1975 to 2005 – Georg Kolbe Museum, Berlin
- 2005 The Beast and other demons – Sprengel Museum Hanover
- 2004 Art in Berlin 15 years after the fall of the wall – San Antonio Public Library Foundation, San Antonio, Texas, USA
- 2004 Viewpoints – Klingspor Museum, Offenbach
- 2004 Civil Courage – Märkisches Museum Witten
- 2003 Diffusion / primarily time – UdK in Opel AG, Berlin and Rüsselsheim (among others with Dieter Appelt and Alexander Kluge)
- 2003 Nine Truths – A-Space, Brooklyn, New York
- 2003 Catch me if you can – National Art Gallery, Tirana, Albania
- 2003 Berlin-Moscow / Moscow-Berlin – Martin-Gropius-Bau, Berlin
- 2003 Contemporary! Art in Berlin – KPM Quartier, Berlin
- 2002 Body Count – Pepper Projects, Berlin
- 1999 The 20th century, faces of the time – Kupferstichkabinett Berlin
- 1999 Red Love – Canvases – Works on Paper – Photographs – Raab Gallery, Berlin
- 1998 German Marks, Postwar Drawings and Prints – Harvard University Museums (Busch Reininger Museum), Boston, USA
- 1998 Echo – Gallery Inga Kondeyne, Berlin
- 1993 Academy 1993 – Academy of Arts, Berlin
- 1993 Renovation – Friedrichstrasse, Berlin
- 1991 Venice Biennale, Italy
- 1989 Art in Berlin 1815 to 1989 – High Museum of Art, Atlanta, Georgia, USA
- 1989 Berlin Art from 1900 to 1989 – Gulbankian Foundation, Lisbon, Portugal
- 1989 25 years of Großgörschen – Gallery Poll, Berlin
- 1989 Machine People – New Society for Fine Arts in the Staatliche Kunsthalle Berlin
- 1988 Stations of Modernism – Berlinische Gallery, Berlin
- 1988 Art after 1945 – New National Gallery, Berlin
- 1987 Location 1987 – Gallery Pels-Leusden, Berlin
- 1987 Positions of Realism – Gallery Poll, Berlin
- 1985 Representation Abroad – Hirshhorn Museum, Washington DC, USA
- 1985 Expozitia de Arta Plastica Contemporary din Republica Federala Germania – Romania
- 1985 Apocalypse (A Principle of Hope) – Hack Museum, Ludwigshafen
- 1983 Realistic Drawings – Neue Nationalgalerie, Berlin
- 1983 Eight artists from the Federal Republic of Germany – Madrid, Spain
- 1981 Känsle och Härdhet – Kulturhuset, Stockholm, Sweden
- 1981 Between heavenly and earthly love – Gallery Brusberg, Berlin
- 1980 Five German Realists – Tuscan Column Hall, Augsburg
- 1980 Forms of Realism Today – Musée d`art contemporain, Montreal, Canada
- 1980 Realism and Expressionism in Berlin Art – Los Angeles, USA
- 1979 New Forms of Realism – Recklinghausen
- 1979 New Forms of Realism – Warsaw
- 1979 Painting in Berlin from 1970 to today – Bonn
- 1978 drawings by realists – Gallery Poll, Berlin - also Amersfoort, Netherlands – also Paris, France
- 1978 As a good realist I have to invent everything – Kunstverein Hamburg – also Badischer Kunstverein, Karlsruhe
- 1978 Biennale of Drawing – Sidney, Australia
- 1978 Ugly Realism – The Roundhouse, London, Great Britain – also Glasgow, Scotland – also The New School for Social Research, New York City
- 1977/78 big city aspect – Berlin – also Frankfurt – also London – also Edinburgh
- 1976 21 artists from Germany – Louisiana Museum, Humlebaek, Denmark
- 1976 Aspects of Realism – Canada
- 1976 Berlin now – New York City
- 1975 Realism and Reality – Kunstverein Darmstadt
- 1974 Love and Death – Neue Gallerie, Aachen
- 1974 Committed Realists – Nassau Art Association, Wiesbaden
- 1974 It's a wonderful Life – Gallery Poll, Berlin
- 1973 With camera, brush and spray gun – Municipal Art Gallery Recklinghausen
- 1973 Leisure Situations – Gallery Poll, Berlin
- 1972/74 Principle of Realism – Berlin – also Munich – also Oberhausen – also Freiburg – also Karlsruhe; – also Gothenburg – also Lund – also Tromso (Sweden); – also Bergen – also Oslo (Norway)
- 1971 Biennale des Jeunes – Paris
- 1971 Contemporary German Art – Tokyo – also Kyoto, Japan
- 1970 3rd International of Drawing, Darmstadt
- 1970 Berlin Realists – Badischer Kunstverein, Karlsruhe
- 1969 Retrospective Großgörschen 35 – Producer Gallery Berlin
- 1969 Berlin artist – Municipal Art Gallery Budapest, Hungary
- 1969 Art Prize of the City of Wolfsburg, Wolfsburg
- 1967 New Realism - House at Waldsee, Berlin
- 1967 Hand drawings and watercolors from the last 20 years – Kunstverein Hannover
- 1967 Artists see themselves – Gallery Schmücking, Braunschweig
- 1967 Young Berlin Artists – Copenhagen, Denmark
- 1966 Young Berlin Artists – Kunsthalle Basel
- 1966 Berlin 66 – Märkisches Museum, Witten
- 1966 Arte Contemporaneo Allemagne – Museo Moderno, Mexico City, Mexico
- 1966 German Artists' Association
- 1965 Young West Art Prize – Kunsthalle Recklinghausen
- 1963/69 Young city sees young art – Wolfsburg
- 1963/68 Great Munich Art Exhibition, Munich
- 1963 Scriptural painting – House at Waldsee, Berlin

== Collections (selection) ==
- Academy of Arts, Berlin
- Berlinische Galerie, Berlin
- Karl Ernst Osthaus Museum
- Kiel Art Gallery
- Märkisches Museum, Witten
- Mumok Museum Moderner Kunst Stiftung Ludwig Wien
- Villa Haiss Museum, Zell am Harmersbach
- nbk New Berlin Art Association
- New National Galerie, Berlin
- Poll, Berlin
- Deutsche Bank Collection, Frankfurt
- Collection of contemporary art of the Federal Republic of Germany
- State Museums in Berlin

== Awards (selection) ==
- 1981 German Critics' Prize
- 1972 Gold medal at the 3rd Biennale Internationale dellagrafika, Florence, Italy
- 1971 Cité des Arts scholarship, Paris, France
- 1969 Painting Prize of the City of Wolfsburg, Wolfsburg

== Work documentation (selection) ==
=== Literature ===
- The Art of Wolfgang Petrick 1962–2017 in Berlin and Brooklyn, published by The Cohen-Hoedemaeker Collection, 289 pages, 2020, ISBN 978-0-578-56395-4 .
- Großgörschen 35. Departure for the Art City of Berlin 1964, edited by Eckhart J. Gillen, Berlin 2014.
- Exhibition catalog with texts by Barbara Esch Marowski, Lothar C. Poll, Eckhard J. Gillen. Haus am Kleistpark in cooperation with the Poll Art Foundation, Berlin 2014.
- On the road, exhibition catalog, Museum of Fine Arts Leipzig, Ulla and Heiner Pietzsch Collection and new works, edited by Hans-Werner Schmidt, 62 pages, 2013, ISBN 978-3-86060-025-2 .
- Turbulence, exhibition book, Kunsthalle Dominikanerkirche, Osnabrück, published by the city of Osnabrück, 128 pages, 2012, ISBN 978-3-939452-18-8 .
- P(R)unk, exhibition catalog, Falckenberg Collection, Hamburg 2010.
- Mutatio, exhibition catalog, Sara Asperger Gallery, 50 pages, Berlin 2008.
- Good Slave – Bad Master, exhibition catalog, Gallery Michael Schultz, Berlin 2006.
- Deep Action, Wolfgang Petrick and master students, exhibition catalog, Georg Kolbe Museum, Berlin 2005.
- Battery – GlassBuilding – Space – Object – Drawing, exhibition catalog, Academy of Arts, Berlin 2000.
- 1999 Painting and Material, exhibition catalog, Haus am Lützowplatz, Berlin 1999.
- Narcissus, exhibition catalog, Raab Gallery, Berlin 1995, ISBN 3-926639-30-X .
- 1962–1989: Leap through the Sun, exhibition catalog, Esslingen ( Villa Merkel ), Hamburg ( Hamburger Kunsthalle ), 1989, ISBN 3-923717-54-7 .
- Wolfgang Petrick, Paintings, Drawings 1979–1982 (catalog book compiled by the artist on the occasion of the exhibition of pictures and gouaches), POLLeditions, Volume 2, Berlin 1982.
- Wolfgang Petrick, works 1962–1979, drawings, pictures, objects, prints, exhibition catalog, Neuer Berliner Kunstverein, Berlin 1979.
- Peter Sager: New forms of realism - art between illusion and reality. DuMont, Cologne 1977, ISBN 3-7701-0656-3 .
- Wolfgang Petrick: Hand drawings, catalog raisonné 1962–1974 created by Werner Nitzsche with the collaboration of Wolfgang Petrick and Lothar C. Poll. Berlin 1974.

=== Portrait (Video) ===
- Wolfgang Petrick (*1939) - 8 "Gerackert und gesoffen" (German)
- Wolfgang Petrick (*1939) - 11 "Berliner Maler" (German)
- Kunstleben Berlin: Das Universum des Wolfgang Petrick (German)
- Sammlung Falckenberg. Dokumentation zur Ausstellung P(R)unk, 2010/2011, präsentiert von Im Atelier Liebermann, Stiftung Brandenburger Tor (German)
- Wolfgang Petrick über seine Arbeit. VernissageTV, 9. Januar 2007 (German)

== Illustration ==
- Alaska! Poems for Lida. Bora Ćosić, Edition Mariannenpresse, Berlin 2008, ISBN 978-3-926433-45-9 .
- Monrovia, mon amour – a journey into the heart of darkness. Hans Christoph book, Edition Mariannenpresse Berlin 2002, ISBN 3-926433-30-2.
