= Knüpfer =

Knüpfer is a surname. Notable people with the name include:

- Johann Knüpfer (1866–1910), schizophrenic outsider artist
- Kerstin Knüpfer (born 1963), German handball player
- Nikolaus Knüpfer (1609–1655), Dutch Golden Age painter
- Sebastian Knüpfer (1633–1676), German composer, conductor and educator

== See also ==
- Edy Knupfer (1912 –1979), Swiss architect
