= Marc-André Charguéraud =

French-born Swiss historian and businessman (1924–2025)

- Born: 30 September 1924; Boulogne-Billancourt, France
- Died: 10 August 2025 (aged 100)
- Education: Sciences Po; Harvard University (MBA)
- Occupation(s): Historian; Businessman

Marc-André Charguéraud (30 September 1924 – 10 August 2025) was a French-born Swiss historian and businessman.

== Life and career ==
Born in Boulogne-Billancourt on 30 September 1924, Charguéraud attended secondary school in Le Chambon-sur-Lignon, where he later recounted his experiences with the Jewish community in the commune. He volunteered for the Free French Forces in 1944 and thereafter earned a degree in law and political sciences from Sciences Po and a Master of Business Administration from Harvard University. He then held executive roles in various corporations, such as the Groupe Bull, Capgemini, and SGS S.A.. He was also a co-founder of the International Museum of the Reformation in Geneva and wrote numerous books on the history of the Holocaust.

Charguéraud died on 10 August 2025, at the age of 100.

== Publications ==
- Tous coupables. Les démocraties occidentales et les communautés religieuses face à la détresse juive (1998)
- L'Étoile jaune et la Croix-Rouge. Le Comité international de la Croix-Rouge et l'Holocauste (1999)
- "Lettre ouverte au professeur Saul Friedlände" (1999)
- Silences meurtriers. Les Alliés, les Neutres et l'Holocauste. 1940-1945 (2001)
- La Suisse présumée coupable (2001)
- La Suisse, la 2e guerre mondiale et la crise des années 90 - Les conditions de la survie (2002)
- Les Papes, Hitler et la Shoah (2002)
- Le Banquier américain de Hitler (2004)
- La Suisse lynchée par l'Amérique (2005)
- Survivre. Français, Belges, Hollandais et Danois face à la Shoah, 1939-1945 (2006)
- Le Martyre des survivants de la Shoah, 1945-1952 (2009)
- Cinquante idées reçues sur la Shoah. Tome premier (2012)
- Cinquante idées reçues sur la Shoah. Tome deuxième (2013)
- Noura. Une émigrée dans la tourmente : Alger 1969 -Paris 1991 (2014)
- Deux familles dans le piège nazi, en France et en Allemagne (1935-1945) (2017)
- Le Monde occidental et la Shoah (2024)
