= Emma Hauck =

German outsider artist (1878–1920)

- Born: 14 August 1878; Ellwangen, Germany
- Died: 1 April 1920 (aged 41); Heidelberg, Germany

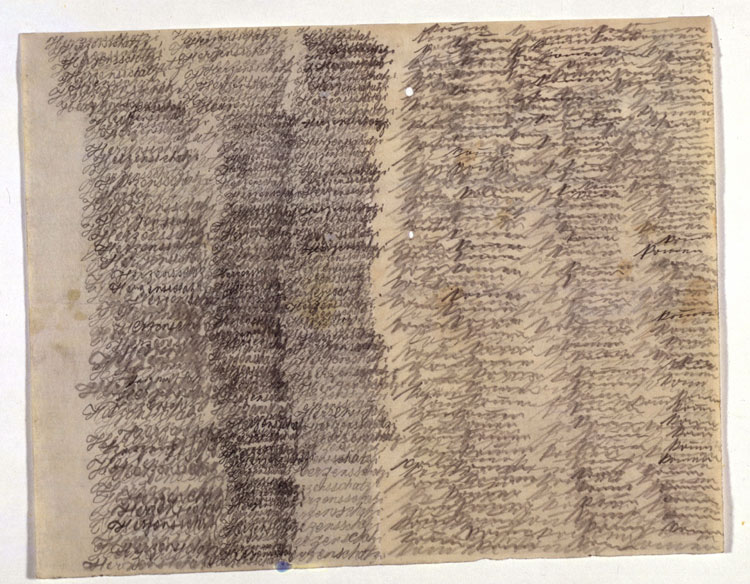
Emma Hauck's letter titled Darling Come

Emma Hauck (14 August 1878 – 1 April 1920) was a German outsider artist known for her artistic, handwritten letters to her husband while she was institutionalized in a mental hospital. Though these letters were never delivered, they have since come to be regarded as works of art due to their abstraction and repetitive content. In many cases the letters consist of only the words "Come sweetheart" or "Come" written over and over in flowing script.

== Biography ==
Emma Hauck was born in Ellwangen, Germany, on 14 August 1878. On 7 February 1909, she was admitted to the psychiatric hospital at the University of Heidelberg at the age of 30, diagnosed with dementia praecox due to severe psychosis. She had married a schoolteacher four years earlier, and was also the mother of two daughters, her husband and family being subjects of her psychosis. While institutionalized, Hauck wrote a series of letters to her husband which were later considered to be artworks, though she likely did not consider them works of art herself. Hauck was released from Heidelberg after a brief stay, though she was later terminally institutionalized at Wiesloch asylum. Hauck died on 1 April 1920 in Anstalt Wiesloch. Her letters are held in the Prinzhorn Collection, Heidelberg, where they were discovered during the time of her death.

== Letters ==
The letters themselves, taken as art, can be considered a form of calligraphy. They also share similarities to asemic writing, in which priority is given primarily to the aesthetic value of the written word, not to its linguistic meaning. Hauck's writing fills the entire page of her letters, in most cases consisting of the repeated phrase "Sweetheart come" (German: Herzensschatzi komm) and in some instances merely "come" (German: komm). These words are written in incredibly dense and at times illegible constructions which vary in shading and value. Hauck's motivation for writing these letters is unknown; they are thought to be an expression of her loneliness due to her constant discussion of her family while institutionalized.

== Legacy ==
Hauck's letters were included in the 2000 exhibition The Prinzhorn Collection: Traces Upon the Wunderblock at the Drawing Center, New York.

In 2000, the Brothers Quay directed the film In Absentia, documenting Hauck's letters. It was included in the 2013 exhibition Quay Brothers: On Deciphering the Pharmacist’s Prescription for Lip-Reading Puppets at the Museum of Modern Art, New York.

Nick Cave's 2001 album No More Shall We Part includes the track "Sweetheart Come" co-written by Cave and Barry Adamson. Its chorus comprises the title phrase sung fourteen times in succession, echoing the incantatory repetition in Hauck's letters.

In 2019, the Utah-based Pygmalion Theatre company produced the play Sweetheart Come based on Hauck's letters and her life story.

In 2021, Amsterdam based photographer Nanouk Prins published a photobook called Empty Forest, based on the letters of Hauck.

== Bibliography ==
- Écrits d’Art Brut. Graphomanes extravagants, Lucienne Peiry, Paris, Le Seuil, 2020. ISBN 978-2-02-144768-2
