= Klett =

Klett may refer to:

== People ==
- Arnulf Klett (1905–1974), mayor of Stuttgart, Germany
- August Klotz (1866–1928), also called August Klett, German artist
- Mark Klett (born 1952), American photographer
- Theodor von Cramer-Klett (1817–1884), German industrialist

== Places ==
- Klett (Norway), a village in Trondheim municipality in Trøndelag county, Norway
