= Karl Brendel =

German sculptor

- Born: Karl Genzel; 21 March 1871; Mühlhausen, Germany
- Died: 21 August 1925 (aged 54); Eickelborn, Germany
- Known for: Outsider artist

Karl Brendel is the pseudonym of Karl Genzel (21 March 1871 – 21 August 1925), a schizophrenic outsider artist and one of the "schizophrenic masters" profiled by Hans Prinzhorn in his field-defining work Artistry of the Mentally Ill (1923, in German; English edition 1972). He was the only sculptor profiled in Prinzhorn's work, and the work also includes more illustrations of his work (twenty-four sculptures and eight drawings) than that of any other profiled artist.

== Life ==
Brendel was born in central Germany, the son of a freight transporter and one of eight children, attending school through the age of 14 and becoming employed variously as a bricklayer, plasterer, and iron moulder in a foundry. He married a widow with three children in 1895 and had two children of his own with her. However, from 1892 on Brendel was sentenced 12 times for assault and battery and property damage, and had to serve a prison term in 1902, at which point his marriage ended. His left leg was injured in an accident in 1900, and later amputated.

The first records of his mental illness come from 1906, when the prison doctor noticed megalomaniacal delusions and abnormal physical sensations; Brendel claimed that he has already experienced a sacrificial death, and that he was Jesus Christ. He was admitted to the Eickelborn asylum, near Lippstadt, in 1907.

== Art ==
Brendel's first artistic expressions came from 1912, when he began modeling obscene figures out of chewed bread. Although none of his bread sculptures survive, he was encouraged by a physician to begin woodcarving at this time.

His favorite subjects for carving were animal reliefs and depictions of his religious hallucinations, particularly the Christ motif. All of his human figures, including Christ, were usually depicted as hermaphrodites. Brendel generally worked in hard woods which he then painted or varnished.

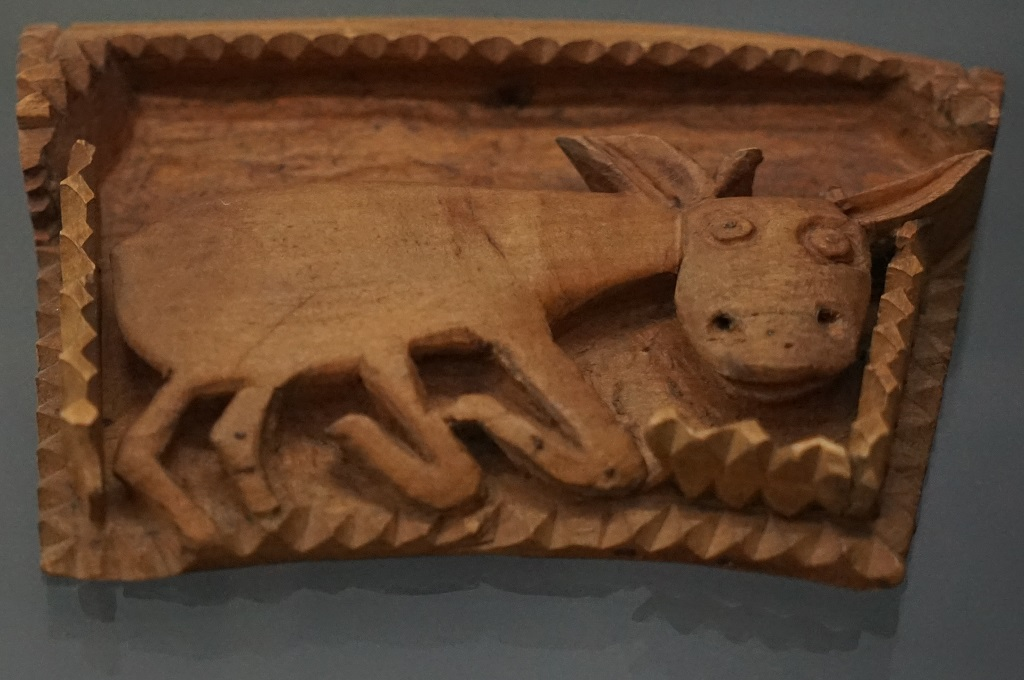
Kuh, die auf katholisch geht (Cow that goes to Catholic [Mass], front view), 1921

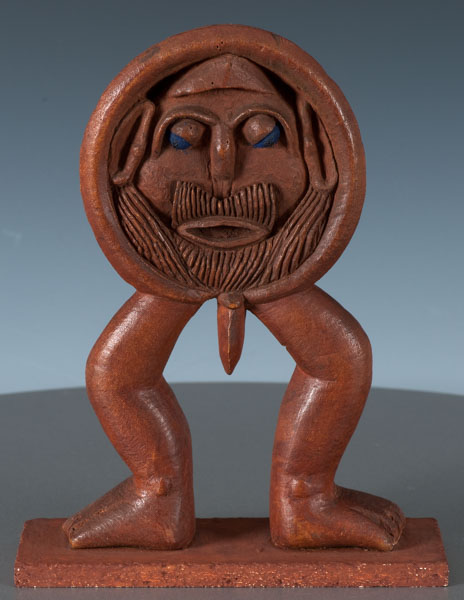
Die Frau mit dem Storch (The Woman With The Stork), 1921

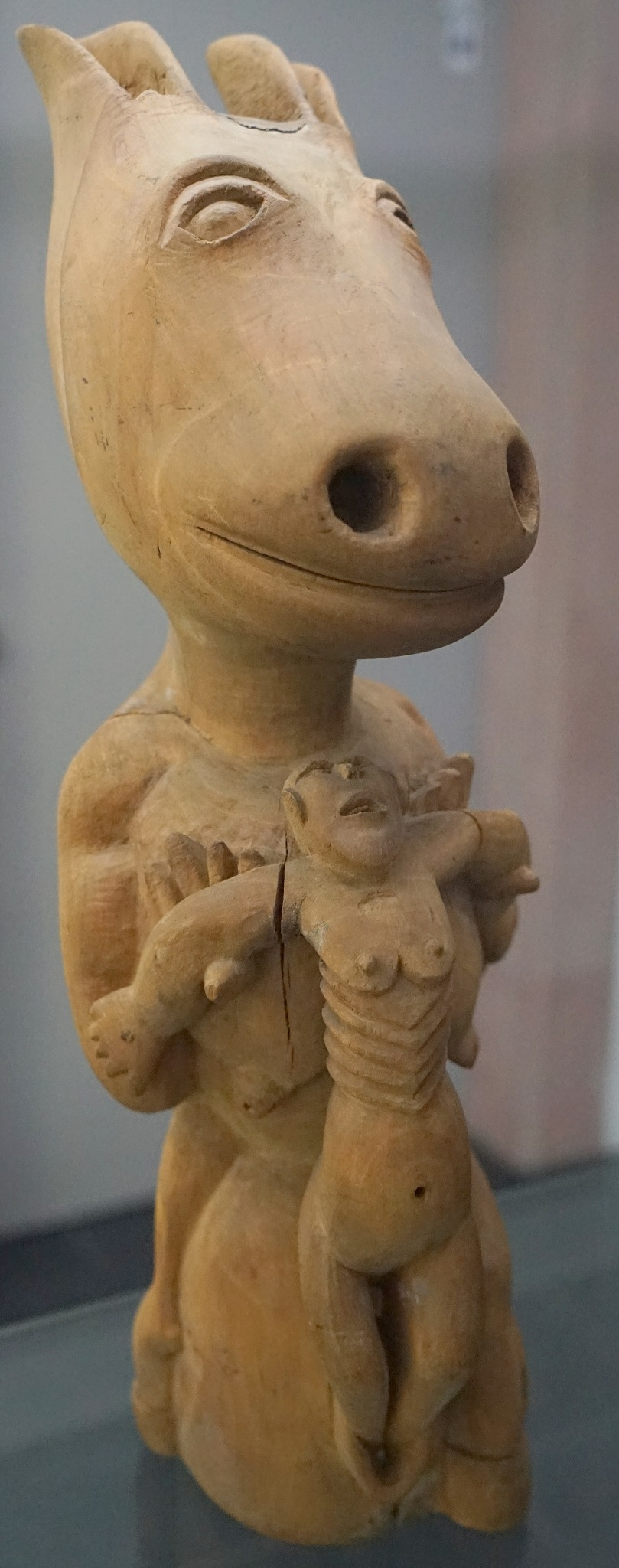
Eselkruzifix (Donkey Crucifix), 1921

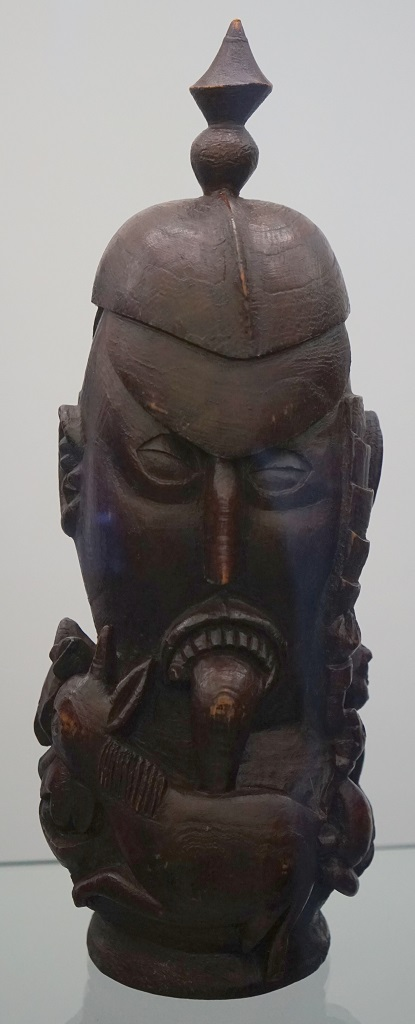
Militarismus (Militarism) 1914/1915

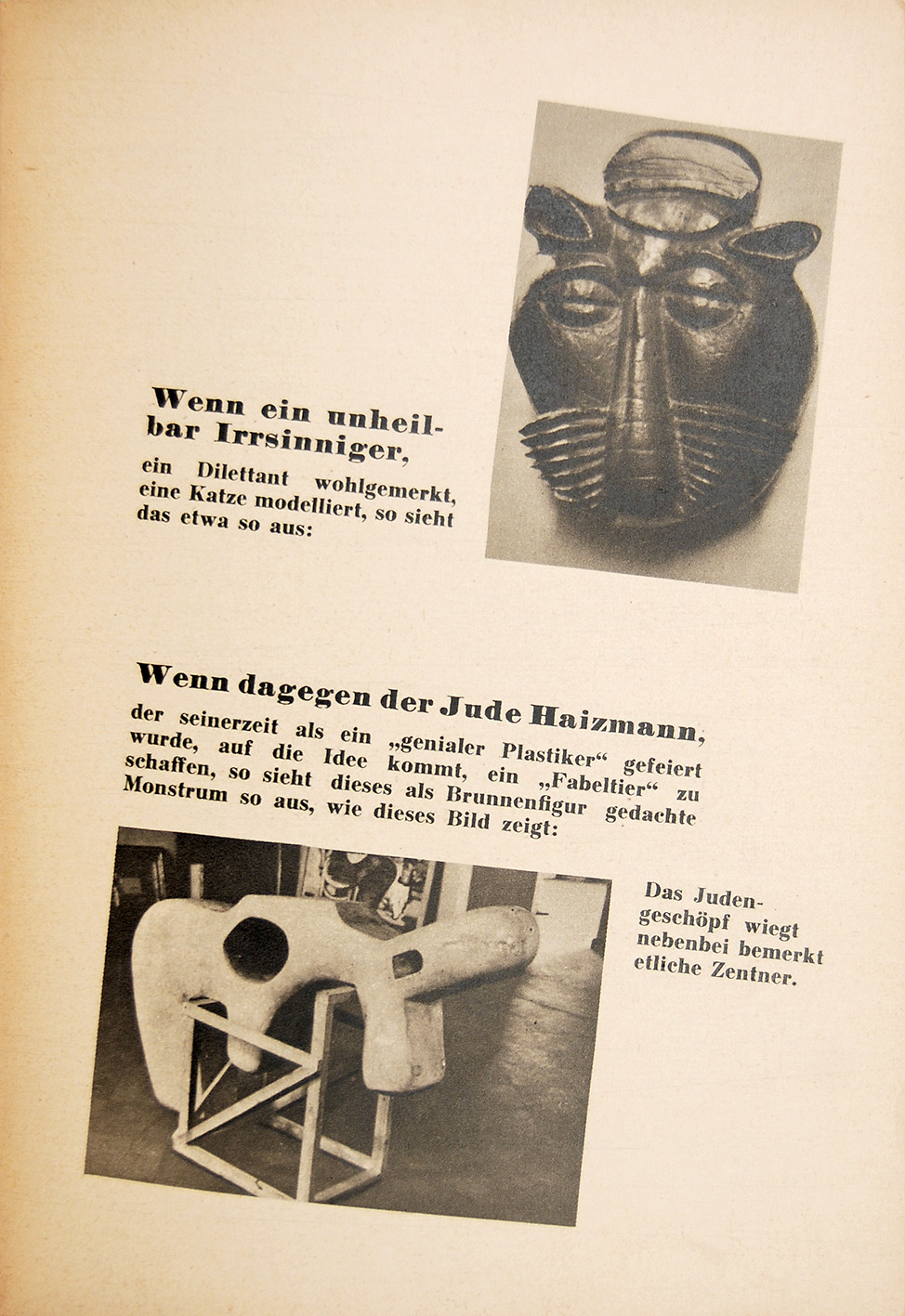
Katze im Ausstellungsführer Entartete Kunst ("Cat" in the exhibition guide Degenerate Art), 1937-1938
