= Peter Moog =

German painter

Peter Moog (1871–1930) was a German outsider artist with schizophrenia, and one of the "schizophrenic masters" profiled by Hans Prinzhorn in his field-defining work Artistry of the Mentally Ill.

Moog became a waiter and later a tavern owner, getting married in 1900 to a woman with whom he had three children. Throughout his life, he had been prone to a "loose life style, alcoholism, and sexual excess" (Prinzhorn 1972, p. 144) and had gonorrhea. He had his first schizophrenic episode in 1908, shortly after his wife's death in 1907.

His episode convinced him to become a poet, and he drifted from town to town attempting to give lectures and start his own printing press. Six weeks afterward, his relatives finally committed him to an asylum. In the asylum he wrote lewd poetry, and started to paint in 1912. In surprising contrast to his verses, however, all of his paintings featured saints and other religious imagery.

The style of his paintings were reminiscent of a stained glass windows. Figures are composed of many narrow strips, each decorated with its own ornamental pattern and each of a different color. (His filling every possible space with decoration is a common feature of art brut: horror vacui.)

He painted saints in order to atone for his earlier sins, and renounced his earlier lifestyle, equating sexuality with sin and renouncing tobacco and alcohol during his years in the asylum.

== Gallery ==
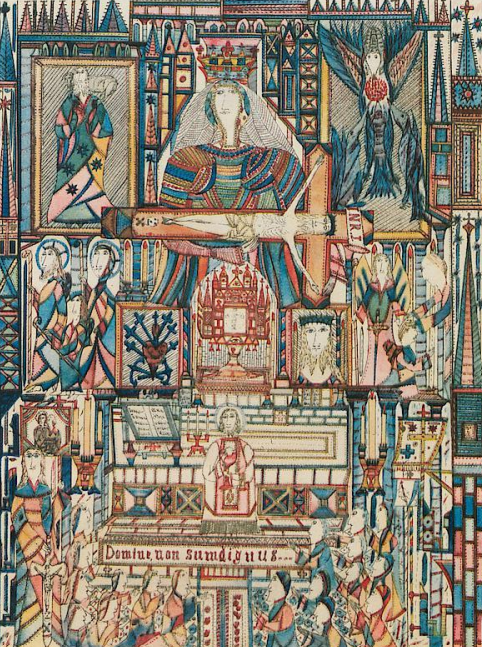
Altar mit Priester und Madame (Altar with Priest and Madonna), panel XI, 1922, Prinzhorn

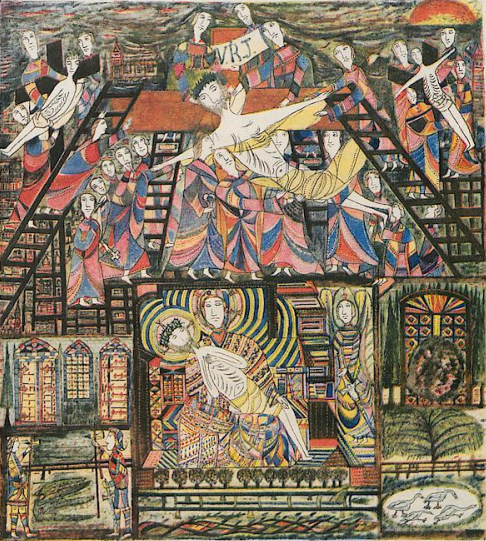
Kreuzabnahme und Pietà (Deposition from the Cross and Pietà), panel XII, Prinzhorn

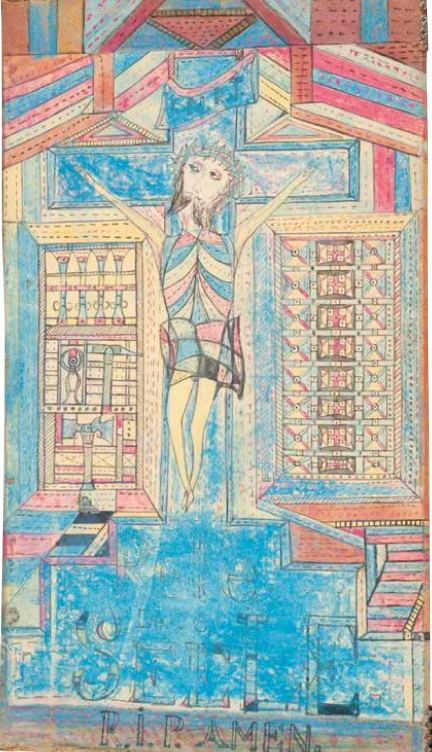
Prachthandschrift (Magnificent Manuscript), Dubuffet's List 2015, p. 51

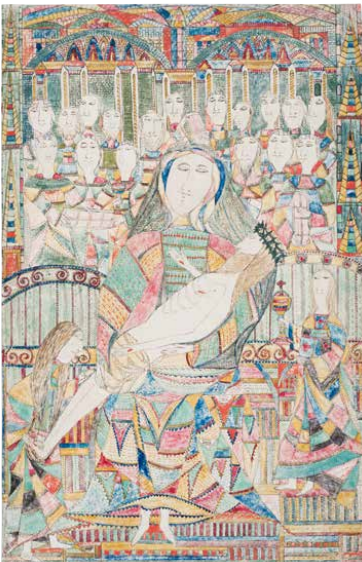
Das heilige Grab (The Holy Sepulchre), Dubuffet's List 2015, pp. 50

== Resources ==
- Prinzhorn, Hans. Artistry of the mentally ill: a contribution to the psychology and psychopathology of configuration. Trans. Eric von Brockdorff. New York: Springer-Verlag, 1972. ISBN 3-540-05508-8.
