= Johann Knüpfer =

German painter

Johann Knüpfer (1866–1910) was a schizophrenic outsider artist and one of the "schizophrenic masters" profiled by Hans Prinzhorn in his field-defining work Artistry of the Mentally Ill.

Knüpfer was a baker's apprentice for three years as a youth before moving to a large city where he worked in a cement factory and learned the trade of locksmithing. His friends persuaded him to marry, but the union was unhappy from the start. He was an alcoholic and an abusive husband, and mistrusted not only his wife but everyone he knew. He attempted suicide in 1902 and was committed soon afterwards.

It became evident that he had been having paranoiac delusions for years, and visions in which Christ explained why he was being persecuted. He told psychiatrists that "no one had suffered as much, not even Christ".

His works can be divided into two categories, the formal religious images covered with oracular inscriptions and the paintings of memories from his youth. Both categories display a preoccupation with symmetry and a fascination with circles.

Knüpfer believed he was a martyr, making religion the main theme of his work. He depicts raw, ecstatic crucified figures. His drawings are accompanied by hearts with arrows through them, probably in reference to the Sacred Heart of Jesus, and comments, often written in circles. Religious symbolism became an obsession for Knüpfer. Johann Knüpfer also produced drawings on the theme of childhood, in which birds play a prominent role.

== Resources ==
- Écrits d’Art Brut. Graphomanes extravagants, Lucienne Peiry, Paris, Le Seuil, 2020. (ISBN 978-2-02-144768-2)
- Prinzhorn, Hans. Artistry of the mentally ill: a contribution to the psychology and psychopathology of configuration. Trans. Eric von Brockdorff. New York, NY: Springer-Verlag, 1972. ISBN 3-540-05508-8.
