= Franz Pohl =

Franz Bühler aka Franz Pohl

Franz Pohl (1868–1940) was the pseudonym of Franz Karl Bühler, a schizophrenic outsider artist and one of the "schizophrenic masters" profiled by Hans Prinzhorn in his field-defining work Artistry of the Mentally Ill.

Bühler was a metalsmith by trade until 1898. In that year he was committed to a mental institution after being pulled on a cold winter day from a canal in Hamburg, into which he had jumped to escape imaginary pursuers. He remained in an asylum for the rest of his life. As he "receded into an autistic existence", he produced a large number of drawings and writings. Many of his drawings were collected by the psychiatrist Hans Prinzhorn, as part of his collection of approximately 6,000 works by 516 mental patients. Bühler's work was especially appealing to Prinzhorn for its Expressionist character. When Prinzhorn published some of Bühler's drawings in 1922 in Artistry of the Mentally Ill, he gave Bühler the pseudonym "Franz Pohl".

In 1940, Bühler was killed during the first Nazi mass-murder programme, Aktion T4, targeting the mentally ill. He was murdered in "a specially adapted home for disabled people at Grafeneck castle, in Swabia."
