= Prinzhorn Collection =

German collection of art by mental patients

Sammlung Prinzhorn
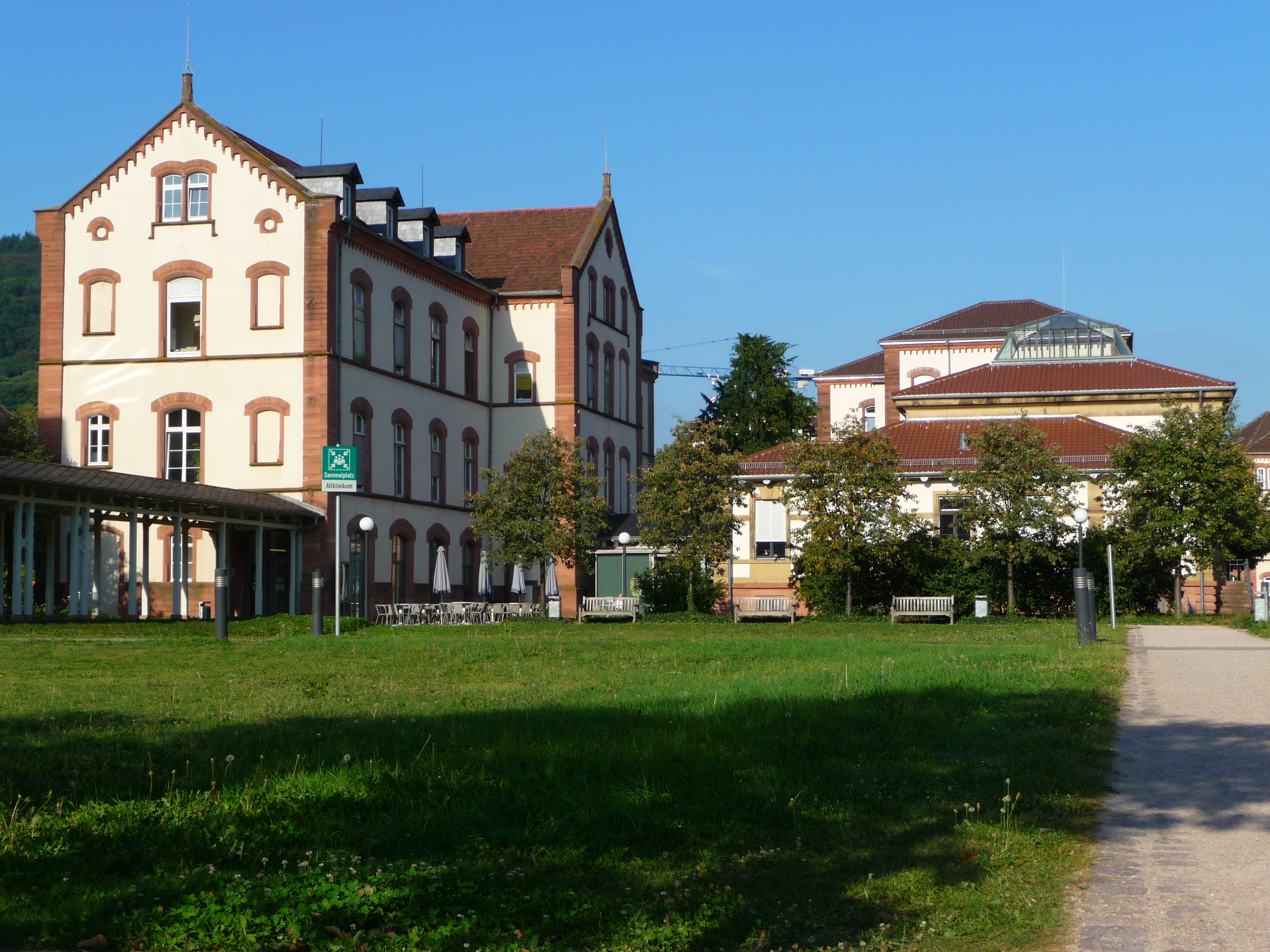
- Location: Germany
- Coordinates: 49°24′35″N 8°41′19″E
- Website: prinzhorn.ukl-hd.de
- Location of Prinzhorn Collection

The Prinzhorn Collection is a German collection of art made by mental health patients, housed at the Heidelberg University Hospital. The collection comprises over 20,000 works, including works by Emma Hauck, Agnes Richter and August Natterer.

== History ==
The collection was founded by the psychiatrist Karl Wilmanns and his assistant, doctor Hans Prinzhorn, in the early 1920s. Between 1919 and 1921, the pair visited mental hospitals across Germany, initially collecting over 5000 works. As of 2016, the collection held over 20,000 works. Prinzhorn, a physician and art historian, was engaged by the hospital in 1919 specifically to improve and expand the collection.

Works from the collection were included in Entartete Kunst, the famous 1937 Nazi exhibition of 'degenerate' art. Following the war, the collection, largely neglected, was stored in the attic of the hospital. In 1973, a conservation effort was undertaken that led to the restoration and cataloguing of the collection.

The collection was influential on the practice of the artist Jean Dubuffet, who visited it in 1950. Writing to Henri Matisse, Dubuffet described it as "something I have dreamt of for years."

In 2001, the collection was opened to the public at the Sammlung Prinzhorn Museum.
