= Viktor Orth =

Outsider artist

Viktor Orth (1853–1919) was a schizophrenic outsider artist and one of the "schizophrenic masters" profiled by Hans Prinzhorn in his field-defining work Artistry of the Mentally Ill. A naval cadet in his youth, Orth was plagued by a paranoia of being poisoned as early as 1878, and in 1880 saw fit to flee his ship and attempt suicide while on a train. From 1883 until his death he would be hospitalized. He believed himself at different times the King of United Kingdom, the King of Saxony, the Duke of Luxembourg, and the King of Poland.

Although the hospital staff had a difficult time getting Orth to do things like eat and clean, he painted compulsively starting in 1900, using plant juices when without paint and painting on walls when they were the only available surface. Although he evidently displayed great concern for pictorial unity, often to the detriment of accurate representation, his individual brushstrokes are messy and disorganized, without the precision that characterizes many schizophrenic works.

== Resources ==
- Prinzhorn, Hans. Artistry of the mentally ill: a contribution to the psychology and psychopathology of configuration. Trans. Eric von Brockdorff. New York, NY: Springer-Verlag, 1972. ISBN 3-540-05508-8.
