= Karl Wilmanns =

German psychiatrist (1873–1945)

- Born: July 27, 1873; Durango, Mexico
- Died: August 23, 1945 (aged 72); Wiesbaden, Germany
- Occupation: Psychiatrist

Franz Karl Heinrich Wilmanns (27 July 1873 – 23 August 1945) was a Mexican-born German psychiatrist who founded the Heidelberg school of psychopathology. In 1933, Wilmanns was fired from Heidelberg University for political reasons.
