= August Klotz =

German painter

August Klett, or Klotz (1866–1928), was a German outsider artist with schizophrenia and one of the "schizophrenic masters" profiled by Hans Prinzhorn in his field-defining work Artistry of the Mentally Ill. The pseudonym August Klotz (Klotz being a disparaging term for a person of low intelligence) was given by Prinzhorn.

He was born in Heilbronn. His father was a prosperous Swabian merchant, and Klotz worked in his father's business as a wine and champagne salesman for many years. Aside from a case of gonorrhea, he was healthy until an attack of influenza in 1903. After his illness he fell into a deep depression in which he heard hallucinatory voices insulting him. He attempted suicide by slashing his abdomen with a knife.

Klotz was placed in an asylum in Göppingen where his case notes describe him as engaged in art-making by August 1903. He rubbed figures into his wallpaper with fat and called them "Freemason signs". He created charts in which letters correspond to numbers, the sums of which correspond to colors. This may be evidence that he experienced an unusual form of grapheme-color synaesthesia.

Klotz loved playing word games, and this same playfulness is apparent in his drawings and watercolors. He often invented lengthy compound nouns, such as Halmdolchfischgradtropfeneweiss ("Stalk-dagger-fish-bone-drop-egg-white"), and his pictures sometimes feature shapes that have double meanings. An example is Klotz's drawing Wurmlöcher (Wormholes), which Roger Cardinal describes as depicting "a head in profile with wavy hair that incorporates fingertips, worms, and caterpillar heads. Another part of the head juxtaposes nuns and flamingoes".

Unlike most outsider artists, Klotz displayed little consistency in his work. He sometimes began a drawing by placing a stone on a sheet of paper and tracing a line around it. Prinzhorn saw him as a shining example of the creative impulse at its most basic. "He always allows himself to be driven by momentary impulses so that his pictures generally incorporate the unconscious components of pictorial creation in a rare state of purity ... he composes completely passively, almost as a spectator, and afterward tries to interpret his configurations".

== Gallery ==
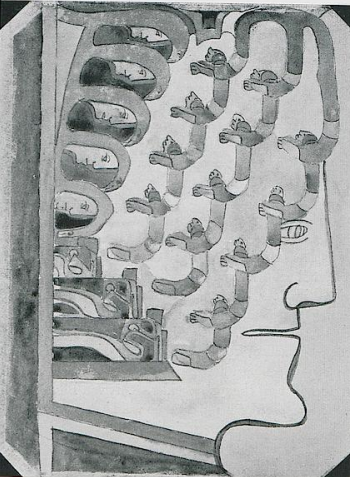
Wurmlöcher (Wormholes), 1922

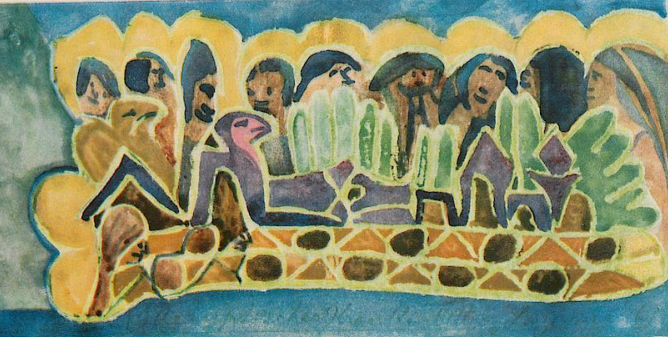
Ägyptisches Krankenbett (Egyptian Sickbed), 1922

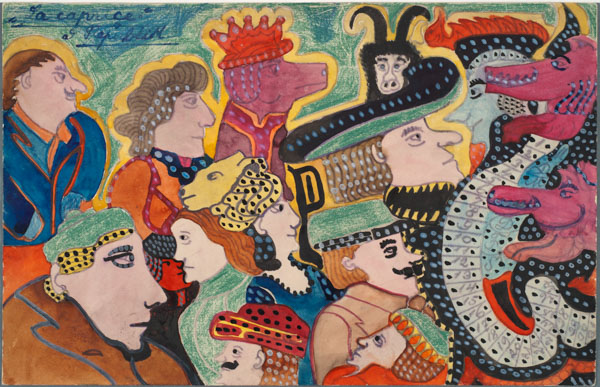
La capric (Caprice), 1923

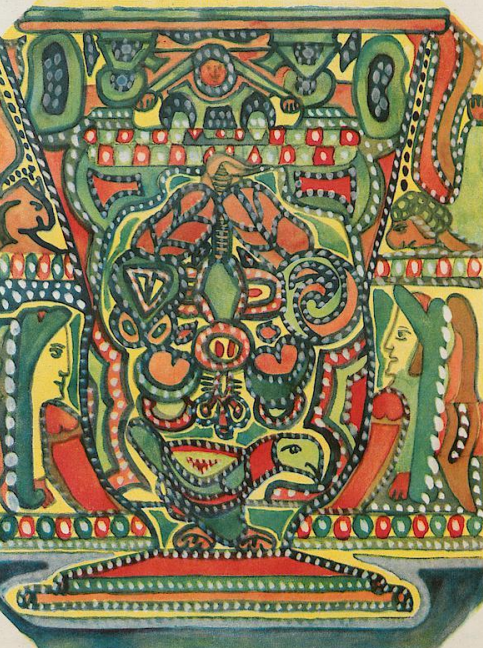
Spielerisch-dekoratives Blatt (Playful-decorative sheet) 1922

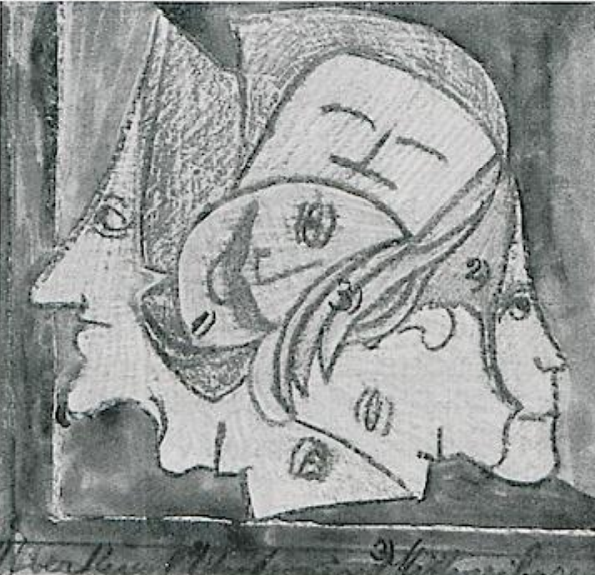
Sechs Gesichter (Six Faces), 1922

== Resources ==
- Cardinal, Roger. 1972. Outsider Art. New York, Washington: Praeger. OCLC 1076124643.
- Krannert Art Museum. 1984. The Prinzhorn Collection: Selected Work from the Prinzhorn Collection of the Art of the Mentally Ill : Krannert Art Museum, University of Illinois, Urbana/Champaign, Champaign, Illinois, November 10, 1984 to January 6, 1985 [and others]. Champaign, Ill: University of Illinois, Urbana/Champaign. OCLC 957161097.
- Prinzhorn, Hans. Artistry of the mentally ill: a contribution to the psychology and psychopathology of configuration. Trans. Eric von Brockdorff. New York, NY: Springer-Verlag, 1972. ISBN 3-540-05508-8.
- http://www.stiftadmont.at/deutsch/presse/prinzhorn/KUeNSTLERBIOGRAFIEN_Handout.pdf
