= Tony LaMadrid =

American patient with schizophrenia

- Born: Antonio LaMadrid; 1968
- Died: March 28, 1991 (aged 22–23); Los Angeles, California, U.S.
- Cause of death: Presumed Suicide

Antonio LaMadrid (1968 – March 28, 1991) was both a patient and research subject at the University of California, Los Angeles (UCLA) Medical Center. He is believed to have killed himself at UCLA. His death led to a federal investigation by the US Office for Human Research Protections that concluded UCLA had violated aspects of informed consent because the research subjects were not told how severe their possible relapses might be.

LaMadrid had schizophrenia, and the research study he was involved in was titled, "Developmental Processes in Schizophrenic Disorders". The study began in 1983 and was run by psychologist Keith H. Nuechterlein and psychiatrist Michael Gitlin.
