= Artistry of the Mentally Ill =

1922 book

- Author: Hans Prinzhorn
- Original title: Bildnerei der Geisteskranken: ein Beitrag zur Psychologie und Psychopathologie der Gestaltung
- Language: German
- Publication date: 1922

Artistry of the Mentally Ill: a contribution to the psychology and psychopathology of configuration (German: Bildnerei der Geisteskranken: ein Beitrag zur Psychologie und Psychopathologie der Gestaltung) is a 1922 book by psychiatrist Hans Prinzhorn, known as the work that launched the field of psychiatric art. It was the first attempt to analyze the drawings of the mentally ill not merely psychologically, but also aesthetically.

In the book, Prinzhorn presents the works of ten "schizophrenic masters", now housed in Prinzhorn Collection at the University Hospital Heidelberg, with in-depth aesthetic analysis of each and also full-color reproductions of their work. These ten masters were (birth names in parentheses):

- Karl Brendel (Genzel)
- August Klotz (Klett)
- Peter Meyer (Moog)
- August Neter (Natterer)
- Johann Knüpfer (Knopf)
- Viktor Orth (Clemens von Oertzen)
- Hermann Beil (Behle)
- Heinrich Welz (Hyacinth Freiherr von Wieser)
- Joseph Sell (Schneller)
- Franz Karl Bühler (Franz Pohl)

The Artistry of the Mentally Ill is the subject of The Gallery of Miracles and Madness by Charlie English first published in 2021.

== Resources ==
- Hans Prinzhorn, Artistry of the mentally ill: a contribution to the psychology and psychopathology of configuration, translated by Eric von Brockdorff from the second German edition, with an introduction by James L. Foy, (Wien, New York: Springer-Verlag), 1972. ISBN 3-540-05508-8.
- Prinzhorn collection museum
- Prinzhorn, Hans. Bildnerei der Geisteskranken (1922), at the University of Heidelberg Digital Library
