= Loren Munk =

American painter

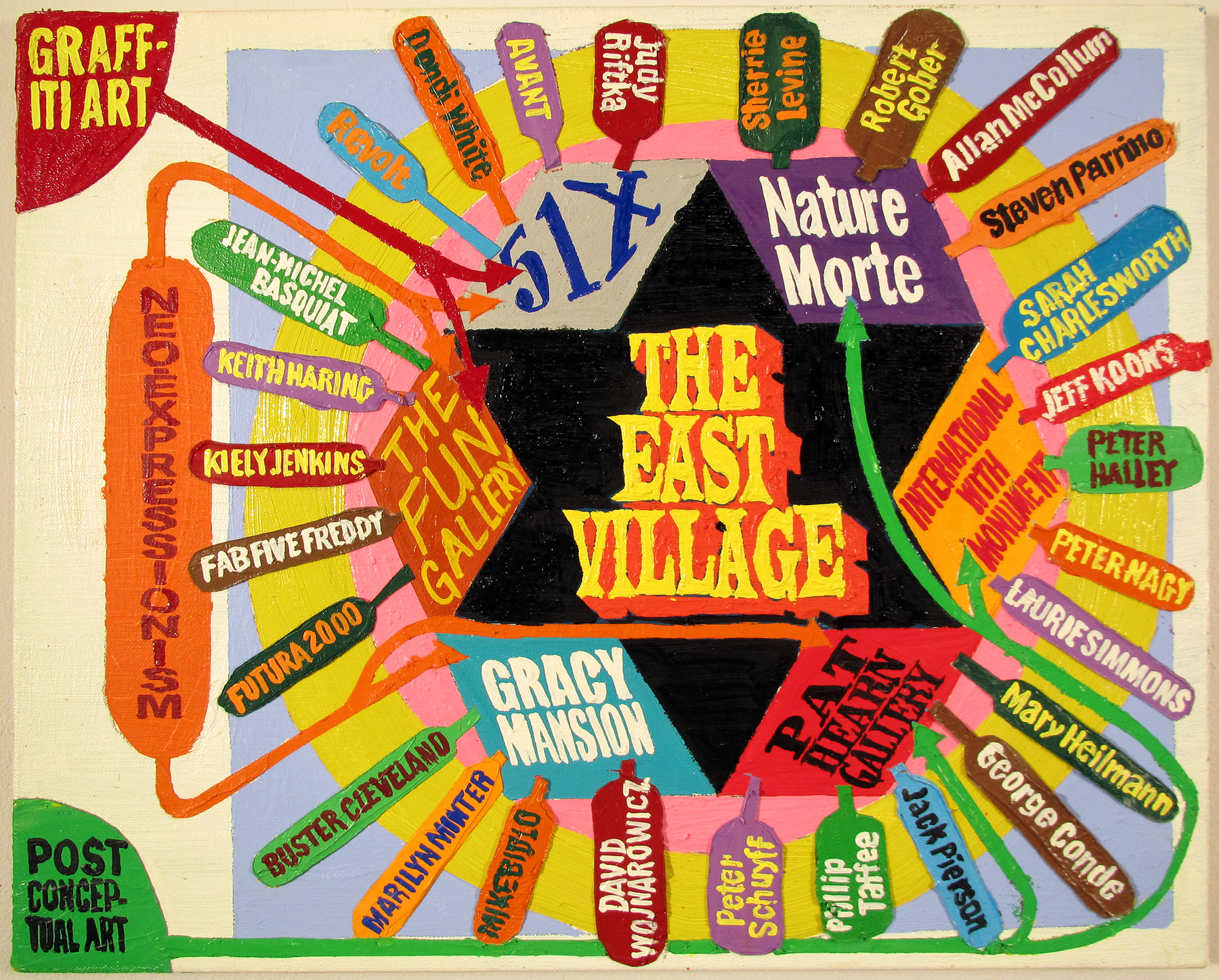
East Village Matrix (study), oil on linen, 16"x 20", 2012

The artist Loren Munk (born 1951) is a painter and a vlogger. In the early 1980's, Munk began exhibiting Cubist and Neo-Expressionist influenced figurative oil paintings that often featured elaborate mosaic frames. In the early 2000s, a new body of paintings emerged that addressed the subject of art itself through a historical and diagrammatic lens. Since 2005, he has also documented the New York art world through his Kalm Report and Rough Cuts YouTube channels under the pseudonym James Kalm.

== Early life and education ==
Munk grew up in Salt Lake City, Utah and Pocatello, Idaho. After serving in the US Army in Landstuhl, Germany, he moved to New York City, where he attended the Art Students League and where he has since resided.

Cheap Sunglasses, oil/linen, glass/wood 58"x48", 1999

== Art career ==
Munk's work debuted in SoHo in 1981 with a double show at J. Fields Gallery and Gabrielle Bryers. Since then, he has overseen an international career. In addition to exhibiting in Brazil, France, Germany and the United States, Munk has received national and overseas, public and private commissions. He is well represented in important collections throughout Europe, South and North America and the Middle East.

Most recently, Munk has been producing a series of paintings which tackle the subject of art itself through a historical and diagrammatic lens. Also, he has expanded upon his role in the artistic community, publishing numerous reviews and essays, curating and promoting several shows, and offering his acknowledged expertise on the Williamsburg arts scene.

== Vlogging ==
Munk documents the New York art world in YouTube videos, using the name James Kalm. The Kalm Report is shot from a first person perspective using a hand held camera. Kalm arrives at an art show by bike — he calls himself "the guy on the bike" — and then walks through the show while providing commentary.
