= Louis Wolfson (writer) =

American writer (1931–2024)

Louis Wolfson (3 April 1931 – 27 June 2024) was an American author who wrote in French. Treated for schizophrenia since childhood, he could not bear hearing or reading his native language and invented a method of immediately transforming every English word he heard or saw into a foreign word with the closest possible sounds and meaning.

== Biography ==
Diagnosed with schizophrenia at an early age, Louis Wolfson was placed in psychiatric institutes during his adolescence, where he underwent severe treatments, notably electroconvulsive therapy (ECT). His relationship with his mother was deeply complex, as she was both his carer and the one who had him institutionalized. Because of his radical intolerance of his native language, which he refused to use, he learned foreign languages (notably French, German, Hebrew and Russian), and became used to spontaneously translating (through a sophisticated technique) whatever was said to him in English into a Sabir of these languages.

In 1963, Wolfson submitted a manuscript to the French publishing house Gallimard in which he set out, in French, the principles of his linguistic system, and how he employed it in his daily life, along with his other mania. About a third of the manuscript was published in 1964 in the Gallimard journal Les Temps Modernes, edited by Jean-Paul Sartre and Simone de Beauvoir. The book Le Schizo et les langues (The Schizo and Languages) appeared in 1970 in the series "Connaissance de l'Inconscient", which had just been launched by writer and psychoanalyst Jean-Bertrand Pontalis. It triggered great critical interest, due in part to the preface by Gilles Deleuze.

Sylvère Lotringer had excerpts from Le Schizo translated into English for Semiotext(e). They appeared in 1978 under the title "Full Stop for an Infernal Planet or The Schizophrenic Sensorial Epileptic and Foreign Languages".

Seven years after the publication of Le Schizo et les langues, Wolfson's mother died of complications from an ovarian tumour. The author, now liberated from her guardianship, left New York and moved to Montreal in 1984.

There, Wolfson wrote an account of the last months of his mother's life, marked by her increasing agony and his obsessive practice of betting on horses. Ma mère, musicienne, est morte... (My Mother, a Musician, Has Died) was published in 1984 by Éditions Navarin. In it, Wolfson uses antisemitic and racist language. Wolfson wrote an entirely new version which was published by éditions Attila in 2012 and contains many additions.

Wolfson moved to Montreal in 1984, and lived there until November 1994 (with a four to five year hiatus in Chicago), when he moved to Puerto Rico. He became a millionaire on 9 April 2003 after winning the lottery, but subsequently lost most of the money through investments which failed during the financial crisis of 2008.

The French newspaper Libération announced in September 2025 that Wolfson had died more than one year prior, on June 27, 2024, in Florida, at the age of 93.

== Bibliography ==
- Wolfson, Louis (1970). Le Schizo et les langues. Connaissance de l'inconscient (in French). (Introduction by Gilles Deleuze). Paris: Gallimard. ISBN 2-07-027436-5. (new edition in 1987)
- Wolfson, Louis (October 1977). "L'épileptique sensoriel schizophrène et les langues étrangères, ou Point final à une planète infernale". Change (in French): 119–130. (changes and additions to Le Schizo et les langues)
- Wolfson, Louis. "Full Stop for an Infernal Planet or The Schizophrenic Sensorial Epileptic and Foreign Languages". Semiotext(e).
- Wolfson, Louis (1984). Ma mère, musicienne, est morte de maladie maligne mardi à minuit au milieu du mois de mai mille977 au mouroir Memorial à Manhattan. Bibliothèque des Analytica (in French). Paris: Navarin. ISSN 0756-273X.
- Wolfson, Louis (2012). Ma mère, musicienne, est morte de maladie maligne mardi à minuit au milieu du mois de mai mille977 au mouroir Memorial à Manhattan. Bibliothèque des Analytica (in French). (new, augmented edition). Le Rayol, France: Éditions Attila. ISBN 978-2-917084-47-2.
