= August Natterer =

German painter with schizophrenia (1868–1933)

- Born: 3 August 1868; Ravensburg, Kingdom of Württemberg
- Died: 7 October 1933 (aged 65); Rottweil, Germany
- Occupations: Artist, electrician

August Natterer (3 August 1868 – 7 October 1933), also known as Neter, was a German outsider artist with schizophrenia.

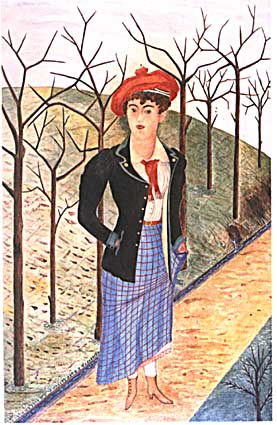
Gehmalin

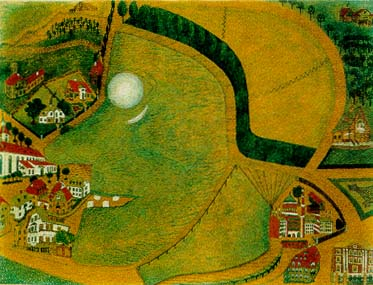
Hexenkopf (The Witch's Head), c. 1915

== Biography ==
August Natterer, given the pseudonym Neter by his psychiatrist to protect him and his family from the intense social stigma associated with mental illness at the time, was born on 3 August 1868 in Schornreute, a quarter of Ravensburg, Germany, the son of a clerk and the youngest of nine children. Natterer studied engineering, got married, travelled widely and had a successful career as an electrician, but was suddenly stricken with delusions and anxiety attacks. On 1 April 1907, he had a pivotal hallucination of the Last Judgment during which "10,000 images flashed by in half an hour". He described it as follows:

I saw a white spot in the clouds absolutely close – all the clouds paused – then the white spot departed and stood all the time like a board in the sky. On the same board or the screen or stage now images as quick as a flash followed each other, about 10,000 in half an hour… God himself occurred, the witch, who created the world – in between worldly visions: images of war, continents, memorials, castles, beautiful castles, just the glory of the world – but all of this to see in supernal images. They were at least twenty meters big, clear to observe, almost without color like photographs… The images were epiphanies of the Last Judgment. Christ couldn't fulfill the salvation because he was crucified early... God revealed them to me to accomplish the salvation.

This ordeal led to a suicide attempt and committal to the first of what would be several mental asylums occupied during the remaining twenty-six years of his life. Natterer thereafter maintained that he was the illegitimate child of Emperor Napoleon I and "Redeemer of the World". The vision had inspired an intense production of drawings, all documenting images and ideas seen in the vision.

August Natterer died of heart failure in an institution near Rottweil in 1933.

== Artistic works ==
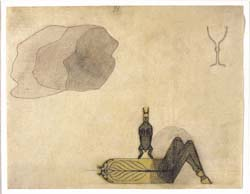
Weltachse mit Hase (Axle of the World, with Rabbit), 1919

Natterer was one of the "schizophrenic masters" profiled by Hans Prinzhorn in his field-defining work Artistry of the Mentally Ill. His drawings are attempts to capture the "10,000 images" of his 1 April hallucination, and are always rendered in a clear, objective style, like that of a technical drawing. This may be due to his background as an electrician.

Natterer once claimed that Axle of the World, with Rabbit had predicted World War I. The rabbit represented "the uncertainty of good fortune. It began to run on the roller... the rabbit was then changed into a zebra (upper part striped) and then into a donkey (donkey's head) made of glass. A napkin was hung on the donkey; it was shaved".

Max Ernst's Oedipus Rex was influenced by Natterer's piece Miraculous Shepherd.

== See also ==
- Bryan Lewis Saunders
