= Lucienne Peiry =

Swiss art historian (born 1961)

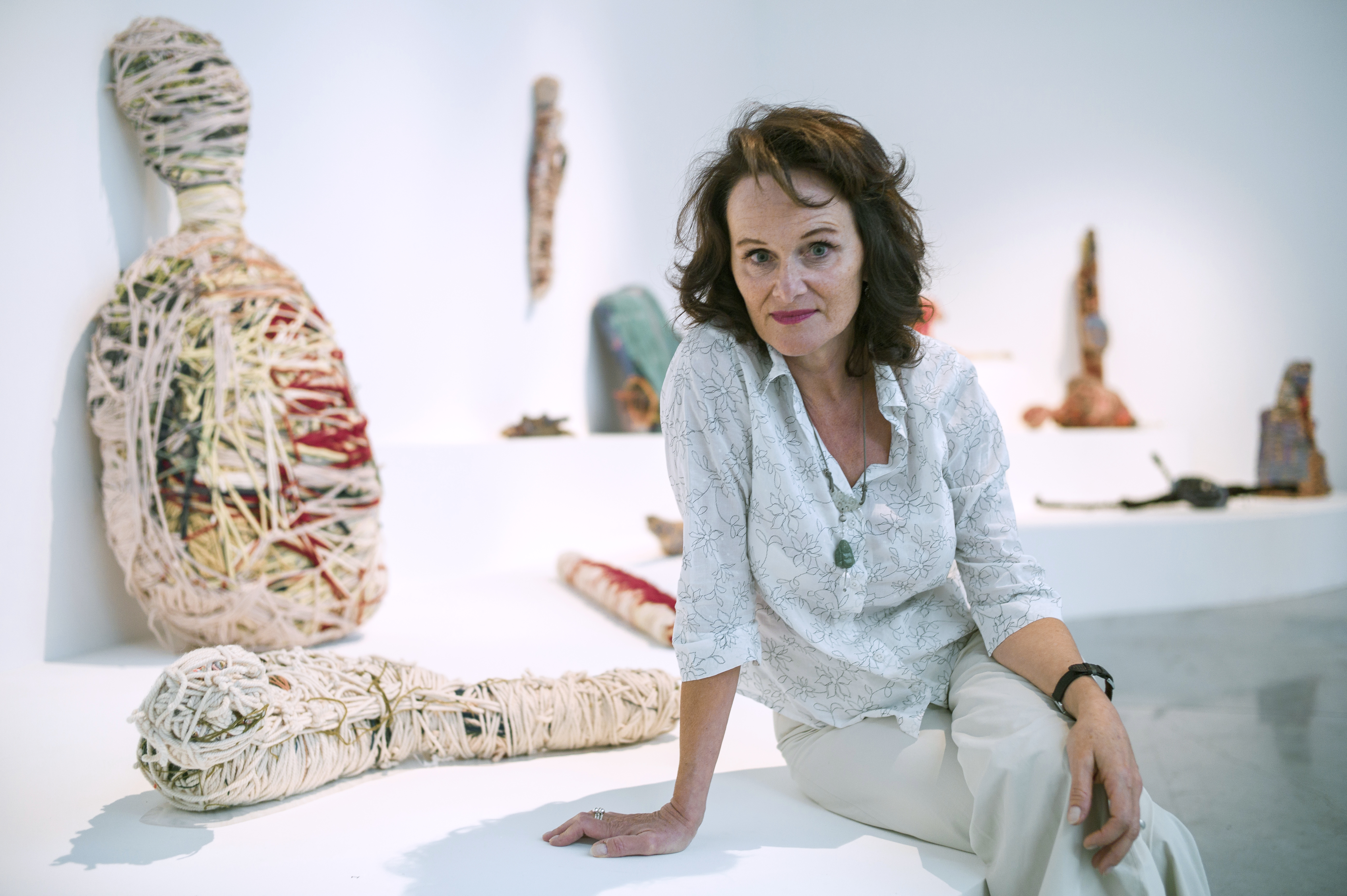

Lucienne Peiry, born in Lausanne on 4 September 1961, holds a doctorate (PhD) in the history of art; she is a specialist in Outsider Art ("Art Brut"), an exhibition curator, a lecturer and the author of several publications. She gives lectures in both Switzerland and elsewhere in Europe, and has been teaching Outsider Art at the Swiss Federal Institute of Technology (EPFL, College of Humanities) in Lausanne since 2010. Since 2016, she has also been teaching at the University of Lausanne (Department of Social and Political Sciences)

== Biography ==
Brought up in the canton of Fribourg, in 1996 Lucienne Peiry was the first woman to obtain a Phd in the History of Art in Lausanne (capital of Switzerland's canton of Vaud). Her thesis was the first to be devoted to "Art Brut" and to the history of the collection that Jean Dubuffet instigated. It was initially published by Flammarion (Paris) as "L'Art Brut," (1997, new editions 1999, 2001, 2006, 2010; English translation 2001, new edition 2006; German translation 2005; Chinese translation 2015); an enlarged and updated version by Flammarion appeared in 2016 (400 pp, 500 illus.).

Formerly, Lucienne Peiry was a journalist with Radio suisse romande (French language radio broadcasts) and, at the same time, a freelance exhibition curator (1987–2001). In 2001, she took over the direction of Lausanne's Collection de l'art brut from Michel Thévoz. In that position, she set up a number of temporary exhibitions and added to the museum's holdings by discovering Outsider Art creators in Switzerland and in various other countries of Europe, as well as in notably India, Japan, China, Benin and Bali.

The author of several works and articles on Outsider Art, Lucienne Peiry has also directed numerous publications and exhibition catalogues for the museum, including the cult book "Collection de l'Art Brut, Lausanne," published by Flammarion-Skira of Paris in 2012 (French, English, German).

Lucienne Peiry has encouraged the museum to produce or coproduce (with the filmmakers Philippe Lespinasse and Erika Manoni) several documentaries on Outsider Art creators. In 2001 she launched a teaching program for the Collection de l'Art Brut (young persons guided tours, activities books, workshops, publications), which she continued to develop.

In 2003, she organized an exhibition on Louis Soutter (title: "Louis Soutter et la musique"), jointly with the Basel Museum of Art and the Cantonal Museum of Fine Art Lausanne. Christian Zacharias, director of the Lausanne Chamber Orchestra (OCL) participated in the project. She set up various partnerships with other Swiss cultural institutions, including the Théâtre de Vidy in Lausanne, the Museum of Art and History in Fribourg, and Lausanne's Petit Théâtre.

Appointed Director of Research and International Relations for the Collection de l'Art Brut in 2012, Lucienne Peiry gave up her position as museum director. She is now in charge of promoting the Lausanne museum abroad (exhibitions, lectures) and of seeking out new Outsider Art creators throughout the world (Europe, Asia, Africa, and more). She encourages studies on the creators she discovers, and on behalf of new publications and documentary films. She also lends advice to students and researchers, being called upon as an expert for works on Outsider Art at various universities (including the "hautes écoles") in Switzerland and abroad.

Since 2012, she has also kept up a monthly artistic contribution for the RTS (Radio Télévision Suisse) broadcasting company, on behalf of their "A vous de jouer" (your turn to play) program on Espace 2.

Lucienne Peiry curated an exhibition on the encyclopedic art work of Armand Schulthess ("The Poetic Labyrinth of Armand Schulthess") at Neuchâtel's Centre Dürrenmatt in 2014, and again at Lugano's Museo cantonale d'Arte in 2016. Two trilingual exhibition catalogues were published for the two events.

In 2017 she curated the show "Inextricabilia, Enchevêtrements magiques" (Inextricabilia – Magical Mesh) at the maison rouge in Paris: in addition to the show's catalogue, many articles and newspaper accounts appeared, together with a major analysis by the art historian Valérie Arconati in the French daily newspaper Libération. Later she curates an exhibition about Curzio Di Giovanni (HEP, Lausanne, 2018) which gathers around 80 drawings shown for the first time to the public, and also the exhibition "Rhinocéros, féroce?", where she creates a dialogue between art and science with rhinoceroses painted and drawn by Gaston Dufour and real stuffed rhinoceroses (Musée cantonal de zoologie, Lausanne, 2019–2020).

She publishes the book "Écrits d'Art Brut. Graphomanes extravagants" (Seuil edition, 2020), which is the catalogue of the exhibition that took place at the Tinguely Museum in Basel in 2021–2022.

Lucienne Peiry curated the exhibition "Écrits d’Art Brut – Wild Expression & Thought" which was presented from October 2021 to January 2022 at the Tinguely Museum in Basel.

From May to September 2022, her exhibition "Parures d'Art Brut" is on view at the Musée des Beaux-Arts du Locle, in Switzerland.

Since 2021 is she part of the research committee for Art Brut at the Centre Pompidou, which has been founded after the donation of the Bruno Decharme collection.

In 2024, Lucienne Peiry proposed an exhibition featuring works by Marc Moret, set against objects of sacred art at the Musée Gruérien in Bulle (Switzerland). In 2025, she then presents “Voir l'invisible. L'Art Brut et l'au-delà” at the Musée international de la Réforme (Geneva), which brings together 14 artists from around the world, many of whose works were exhibited to the public for the first time.

The French Ministry of Culture awards her the insignia of Chevalière de l'Ordre des arts et des lettres for the contribution she has “made to the influence of the arts and letters in France and throughout the world”, in 2025.

== Publications ==
This is a non exhaustive list of Lucienne Peiry's publications.

- Parures et vêtements d'Art Brut, Paris, Le Seuil, 2026 (ISBN 978-2-02-153623-2)
- Das steinerne Buch, Basel, Editions Valnød, 2026 (ISBN 978-3-9526035-9-8)
- Le Jardin de la mémoire, Paris, Allia, 2021. (ISBN 979-10-304-1543-8)
- Écrits d'Art Brut. Graphomanes extravagants, Paris, Le Seuil, 2020. (ISBN 978-2-02-144768-2)
- Le Livre de pierre. Fernando Nannetti, Paris, Allia, 2020. (ISBN 9791030412147)
- Rhinocéros féroce?, under the direction of Lucienne Peiry and Michel Sartori, Lausanne, Musée cantonal de zoologie, 2019. (ISBN 978-2-940187-18-8)
- Curzio di Giovanni. Face-à-face, Lausanne, HEPL, 2018.
- Inextricabilia. Enchevêtrements magiques, under the direction of Lucienne Peiry, co-published by Flammarion and La maison rouge, Paris, 2017.ISBN 9782081411821
- L'Art Brut, Flammarion, Paris, 1997, 2006, 2010, 2016. ISBN 978-2-08137-538-3
- L'Art Brut, Shanghai, Presses universitaires de Shanghai, 2015. ISBN 978-7-5671-1750-1
- L'Art Brut dans le monde, Infolio and Collection de l'Art Brut, Gollion and Lausanne, 2014. ISBN 978-2-88474-730-1
- Collection de l'Art Brut, with Sarah Lombardi, Skira, Geneva, 2012. ISBN 978-2-08125-323-0
- Guo Fengyi, Collection de l'Art Brut, Lausanne, 2011.
- Nannetti, under the direction of Lucienne Peiry, Infolio and Collection de l'Art Brut, Gollion and Lausanne, 2011. ISBN 978-2-88474-237-5
- Art Brut du Japon, under the direction of Lucienne Peiry, Infolio and Collection de l'Art Brut, Gollion and Lausanne, 2008. ISBN 978-2-88474-075-3
- Le Royaume de Nek Chand, under the direction of Lucienne Peiry, Flammarion, Paris, 2005, 2006. ISBN 978-2-08011-477-8
- Dubuffet & l'Art Brut, edition 5 Continents, Milan, 2005. ISBN 978-8-87439-226-1
- Écriture en délire, under the direction of Lucienne Peiry, 5 Continents and Collection de l'Art Brut, Milan and Lausanne, 2004. ISBN 978-8-87439-109-7
- Art Brut. The Origins of Outsider Art, Flammarion, Paris, 2001 ISBN 978-2-08010-584-4 (Broché ISBN 978-2-08010-584-4), 2006 ISBN 978-2-08030-543-5 (Broché ISBN 978-2-08030-543-5)
