= International Museum of the Reformation =

Museum in Geneva on the history of the Reformation

- Musée international de la Réforme
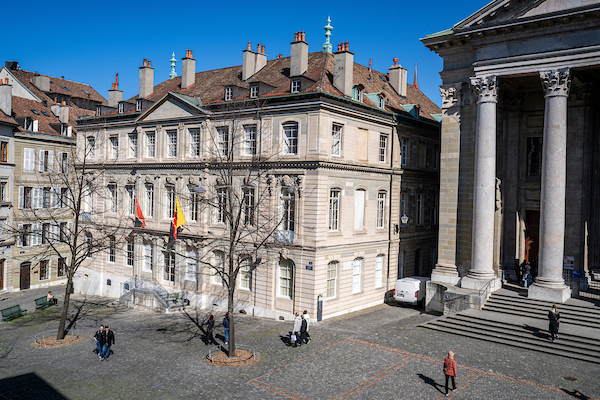
- Facade of the Maison Mallet and entrance to the museum
- Established: 15 April 2005
- Location: Rue du Cloître 2, 1204 Geneva, Canton of Geneva, Switzerland
- Coordinates: 46°12′05″N 6°08′54″E
- Visitors: 25,000 annually
- Website: www.musee-reforme.ch

The International Museum of the Reformation (French: Musée international de la Réforme) is a museum in Geneva, Switzerland, dedicated to the history and heritage of the Protestant Reformation. It was opened in 2005.
