= Hans Prinzhorn =

German psychiatrist and art historian (1886–1933)

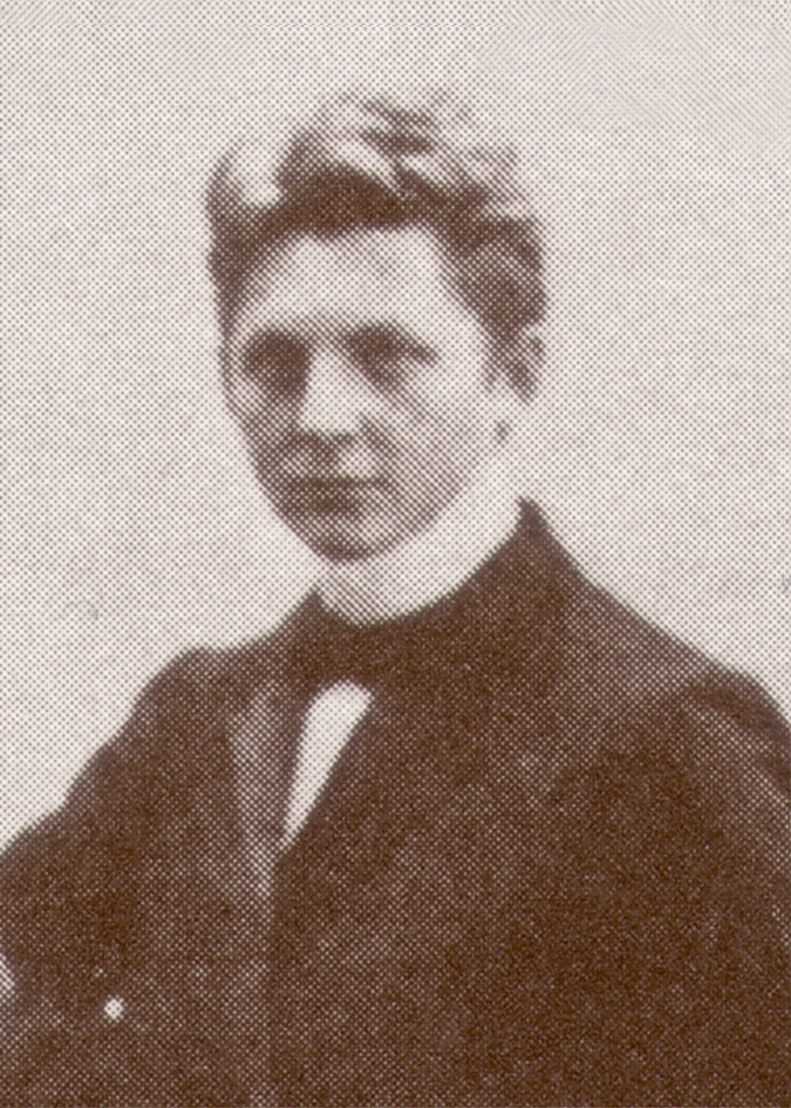
Hans Prinzhorn (1904)

Hans Prinzhorn (6 June 1886 – 14 June 1933) was a German psychiatrist and art historian.

== Biography ==
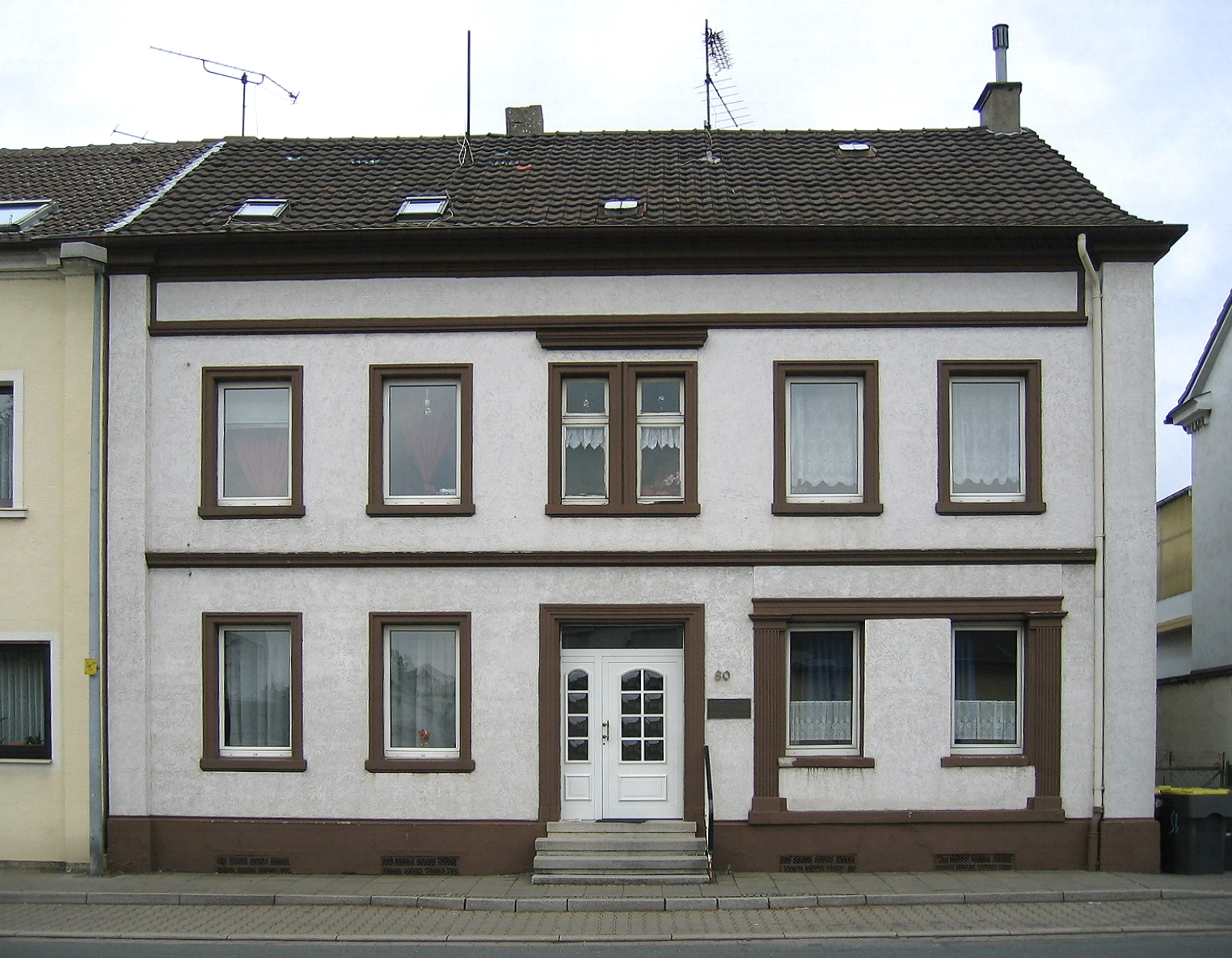
Prinzhorn's birthplace in Hemer

Born in Hemer, Westphalia, he studied art history and philosophy at the universities of Tübingen, Leipzig and Munich, then receiving his doctorate under Theodor Lipps with the dissertation "Gottfried Semper's basic aesthetic views" in 1908. He then went to the Leipzig Conservatory in 1909 and received lessons in music theory and piano. Afterwards he went to London to pursue his desire of becoming a singer, however his voice was ultimately not good enough for an artistic career. After his second wife developed a psychiatric illness, he gained an interest for medicine. In 1913 he started studying medicine, receiving his training at the universities of Freiburg and Strasbourg. He completed his second doctorate (in medicine) in 1919 at the University of Heidelberg after an invitation from Karl Wilmanns, with the dissertation "The artistic capabilities of the mentally ill". Fresh after graduation, he worked as a military doctor when World War 1 broke out.

In 1919 he became assistant to Karl Wilmanns at the psychiatric hospital of the University of Heidelberg. His task was to expand an earlier collection of art created by the mentally ill and started by Emil Kraepelin. When he left in 1921 the collection was extended to more than 5,000 works by about 450 "cases".

In 1922 he published his first and most influential book, Bildnerei der Geisteskranken. Ein Beitrag zur Psychologie und Psychopatologie der Gestaltung (Artistry of the mentally ill: A Contribution to the Psychology and Psychopathology of Configuration), richly illustrated with examples from the collection. While his colleagues were reserved in their reaction, the art scene was enthusiastic. Jean Dubuffet was highly inspired by the works, and the term Art Brut was coined.

The book is mainly concerned with the borderline between psychiatry and art, illness and self-expression. It represents one of the first attempts to analyse the work of the mentally ill.

Following a dispute at Heidelberg, he decided to search for other positions. After short stays at sanatoriums in Zürich, Dresden and Wiesbaden, he oriented himself to work as a psychotherapist and opened his own practice in Frankfurt in 1925, but it wasn't very successful. He published a follow up project to his first book, titled "Bildnerei der Gefangenen" (Artistry of Prisoners) in 1926, however it did not have the same impact as his first publication. He also wrote poems, which were published by a private publisher after his death. He continued to write numerous other books which were mainly on the field of psychotherapy. He approached psychology with an original method where he combined philosophy, anthropology and psychoanalysis. He went on to give lectures over radio, and he was a sought-after speaker home and abroad. He went to an invitation-based lecture tour of US universities in 1929. His original approach was well respected within the German community, however it was largely forgotten due to the dominant force of experimental psychology. His hopes to find a permanent position at a university were never fulfilled. Disillusioned by professional failures, and after three failed marriages, he moved in with an aunt in Munich and retreated from public life, making a living from giving lectures and writing essays. He died in 1933 in Munich after contracting typhus on a trip to Italy.

Shortly after his death the Prinzhorn Collection was stowed away in the attics of the university. In 1938 a few items were displayed in the Nazi propaganda exhibition Entartete Kunst ("Degenerate Art"). Since 2001 the collection has been on display in a former chapel at the University of Heidelberg.

== Books ==
- Hans Prinzhorn, Artistry of the mentally ill: a contribution to the psychology and psychopathology of configuration, translated by Eric von Brockdorff from the second German edition, with an introduction by James L. Foy (Wien, New York: Springer-Verlag), 1995. ISBN 3-211-82639-4
- Hans Prinzhorn, Expressions de la Folie. Paris: Gallimard, 1984.
- Catherine de Zegher (ed.), The Prinzhorn Collection: Traces upon the Wunderblock. Essays by C. de Zegher, Hal Foster, Sander L. Gilman, S. Weiss and Bracha Lichtenberg Ettinger. The Drawing Center's Drawing Papers no. 7, 2000.
- Hans Prinzhorn, "Psychotherapy: Its Natures - Its Assumptions - Its Limitation: A Search for Essentials", translated & Edited in collaboration with the author by Arnold Eiloart (Jonathan Cape), 1932.

== Films ==
- Christian Beetz, Between Insanity and Beauty - The Art Collection of Dr. Prinzhorn, Adolf-Grimme-Award 2008 (Beetz Brothers Film Production, Germany), 2008.

The film follows the history of the Prinzhorn Collection, illustrating the inner conflicts of the schizophrenic patients through their artwork.
