= List of outsider artists =

Outsider artists are self-taught creators of visionary art and naïve art known for the creation of artworks that are primarily visual in nature such as drawings, paintings, sculptures, and visionary environments.

A B C D E F G H I J K L M N O P Q R S T U V W X Y Z

== A ==
- Jesse Aaron (1887–1979), United States
- Gayleen Aiken (1934–2005), United States
- Pearl Alcock (1934–2006), United Kingdom
- Consuelo González Amezcua (1903–1975), United States
- Eugene Andolsek (1921–2008), United States
- Eddie Arning (1898–1993), United States
- James Arnold (1909–1999), United Kingdom
- Nellie Ashford (born c. 1943), United States

== B ==
- Eldren Bailey (1903–1987), United States
- Carol Bailly (born 1955), United States/Switzerland
- Michael Banks (born 1972), United States
- Julie Bar (1868–1930), Switzerland
- Juliette Élisa Bataille (1896–1972), France
- Daniel Belardinelli (born 1961), United States
- Charles Benefiel (born 1967), United States
- Deborah Berger (1956–2005), United States
- Sarah Berman (1895-1957), Ukrainian/American
- Dorothy Berry (born 1942), Australia
- Gregory Blackstock (1946–2023), United States
- Josef Blahaut (born 1922), Austria
- Nick Blinko (born 1961), United Kingdom
- Ursula Schultze-Bluhm (1921–1999), Germany
- Thérèse Bonnelalbay (1931–1980), France
- Neil Breen (born 1946), United States
- Marguerite Burnat-Provins (1872–1952), France
- Richard Burnside (1944–2020), United States
- Vernon Burwell (1916–1990), United States
- Gladwyn Bush (1914–2003), Cayman Islands
- Hawkins Bolden (1914–2005), United States

== C ==
- Al Carbee (1914–2005), United States
- Jim Carrey (born 1962), Canada
- Benny Carter (1943–2014), United States
- James Castle (1899–1977), United States
- Gaston Chaissac (1910–1964), France
- Tsang Tsou Choi (1921–2007), Hong Kong
- Nek Chand (1924–2015), India
- Ferdinand Cheval (1836–1924), France
- Felipe Jesus Consalvos (1891–1960), Cuba/United States
- Sylvia Convey (born 1948), Germany/Australia
- Aloïse Corbaz (1886–1964), Switzerland
- Joseph Crépin (1875–1948), France
- María Ángeles Fernández Cuesta (La Pinturitas) (born 1950), Spain

== D ==
- Gerry Dalton (1935-2019), Ireland
- Henry Darger (1892–1973), United States
- Sylvette David (born 1934), France
- Terry A. Davis (1969–2018), United States
- Vestie Davis (1903–1978), United States
- David Dees (1957-2020), United States
- Charles Dellschau (1830–1923), Prussia/United States
- Mike Disfarmer (1884–1959), United States
- Thornton Dial (1928–2016), United States
- Hiroyuki Doi (born 1946), Japan
- Sam Doyle (1906–1985), United States
- Francis E. Dec (1926-1996), United States

== E ==
- William Edmondson (1870–1951), United States
- Eli Jah (born circa 1950), Jamaica
- Minnie Evans (1892–1987), United States

== F ==
- Howard Finster (1916–2001), United States
- Alois Fischbach (1926–1981), Austria
- Johann Fischer (born 1919), Austria
- Louise Fischer (1896–1987), France
- Auguste Forestier (1887–1958)
- Adolphe Julian Fouéré (1839–1910), France
- Wes Freed (1964–2022), United States

== G ==
- Johann Garber (born 1947), Austria
- Carl Genzel (1871–1925)
- Madge Gill (1882–1961), United Kingdom
- Ron Gittins (1939–2019), United Kingdom
- Lee Godie (1909–1994), United States
- Helga Goetze (1922–2008), Germany
- Paul Goesch (1885–1940), Germany
- Grace Bashara Greene (1928–2004), United States
- Ken Grimes (born 1947), United States

== H ==
- Adelaide Hall (c. 1862–1945), United States
- James Hampton (1909–1964), United States
- Alyne Harris (1942–2025), United States
- Emma Hauck (1878–1930), Germany
- Johann Hauser (1926–1996), Austria
- Magali Herrera (1914–1992), Uruguay
- Lonnie Holley (born 1950), United States
- Annie Hooper (1897–1986), United States
- Jesse Howard (1885–1983), United States
- L.V. Hull (1942–2008), United States
- Clementine Hunter (1886–1988), United States

== J ==
- Mercedes Jamison (1933–1997), United States
- Jandek (born 1945), United States
- Mary Jewels (1886–1977), United Kingdom
- William H. Johnson (1901-1970), United States
- Daniel Johnston (1961–2019), United States

== K ==
- John Urho Kemp (1942–2010), United States
- Richard Gordon Kendall (1933–2008), United States
- Susan Te Kahurangi King (born 1951), New Zealand
- Norbert Kox (1945–2018), United States

== L ==
- Helen LaFrance (1919–2020), United States
- Damian Le Bas (1963–2017), United Kingdom
- Augustin Lesage (1876–1954), France
- Joe Light (1934–2005), United States
- Alexander Lobanov (1924–2003), Russia
- Ronald Lockett (1965–1998), United States
- Séraphine Louis (1864–1942), France
- Claudine Loquen (born 1965), France

== M ==
- Vivian Maier (1926–2009), United States
- Helen Martins (1897–1976), South Africa
- Malcolm McKesson (1910–1999), United States
- Gustav Mesmer (1903–1994), Germany
- Joe Minter (born 1943), United States
- Farouq Molloy (born 1957), United Kingdom
- Sister Gertrude Morgan (1900–1980), United States
- Heinrich Anton Müller (1869–1930), Switzerland
- John Bunion Murray (1908–1998), United States

== N ==
- Nikifor (1895-1968), Poland

== O ==
- Teofil Ociepka (1891-1978), Poland

== P ==
- Philadelphia Wireman, United States
- Samer Peerachai (born 1961), Thailand
- Laure Pigeon (1882–1965), France
- Horace Pippin (1888-1946), United States
- Tressa "Grandma" Prisbrey (1896–1988), United States
- Mary Proctor (born 1960), United States
- Noah Purifoy (1917–2004), United States

== R ==
- Martín Ramírez (1895–1963), Mexico/United States
- Royal Robertson (1930–1997), United States
- Simon Rodia (1879–1965), Italy/United States
- Juanita Rogers (1934–1985), United States
- Nellie Mae Rowe (1900–1982), United States

== S ==
- Ody Saban (born 1953), Turkey/United States
- Ossie Lee Samuels (1931 – 2017), United States
- Jean-Joseph Sanfourche (1929–2010), France
- Eugenio Santoro (1920–2006), Italy/Switzerland
- Nathan Schiff, United States
- Judith Scott (1943–2005), United States
- Emmer Sewell (born 1934), United States
- Vollis Simpson (1919–2013), United States
- Marguerite Sir (1890–1957), France
- SLART (1982–), Swindon, England
- Mirosław Śledź (1961–), Poland
- Mary T. Smith (1904–1995), United States
- Georgia Speller (1931–1988), United States
- Lee Steen (1897–1975), United States
- Jimmy Lee Sudduth (1910–2007), United States
- Robert Sundholm (1941–2023), United States
- Barbara Symmons (born 1936), United Kingdom

== T ==
- Claire Teller (born 1928), United Kingdom
- Jeanne Thomarat (1893–1985), Canada
- Mose Tolliver (1921–2006), United States
- Pauline Tollet, United Kingdom
- Bill Traylor (1853-1949), United States
- Jeanne Tripier (1869–1944), France

== U ==
- Shafique Uddin (born 1962), United Kingdom

== V ==
- Eugene Von Bruenchenhein (1910–1983), United States
- Pierre Vuitton, France (1880–1962)

== W ==
- Abraham Lincoln Walker (1921-1993), United States
- August Walla (1936–2001), Austria
- Alfred Wallis (1855 - 1942), United Kingdom
- Wesley Willis (1963–2003), United States
- Mary Ann Willson (active approximately 1810 to 1825), United States
- Ben Wilson (born 1963), England
- Scottie Wilson (1888–1972), United Kingdom
- Jane Winkelman (1949–2012), United States
- Anna Aleric Watts (1824–1884), United Kingdom
- Adolf Wölfli (1864–1930), Switzerland

== Y ==
- Brooks Yeomans (born 1957), United States
- Joseph Yoakum (1890–1972), United States
- Kiyoshi Yamashita (1922–1971), Japan
- Purvis Young (1943–1990), United States

== Z ==
- Anna Zemánková (1908–1986), Czech Republic
- Carlo Zinelli (1916–1974), Italy
