= Maxent =

Maxent may refer to:

- Maximum entropy (disambiguation)
- Maxent, a commune of the Ille-et-Vilaine département in France
