= Abraham Walker =

Abraham Walker may refer to:

- Abraham Beverley Walker (1851–1909), Black Canadian lawyer and journalist
- Abraham Lincoln Walker (1921–1993), African American artist
