= Belardinelli =

Belardinelli is an Italian surname. Notable people with the surname include:

- Daniel Belardinelli (born 1961), American artist
- Luca Belardinelli (born 2001), Italian footballer
- Massimo Belardinelli (1938–2007), Italian comic artist
