= Fouéré =

Fouéré is a surname. Notable people with the surname include:

- Adolphe Julian Fouéré (1839–1910), French artist and priest
- Olwen Fouéré (born 1954), Irish actress, daughter of Yann
- Yann Fouéré (1910–2011), Breton nationalist
