= Turk Scott =

American politician (died 1973)

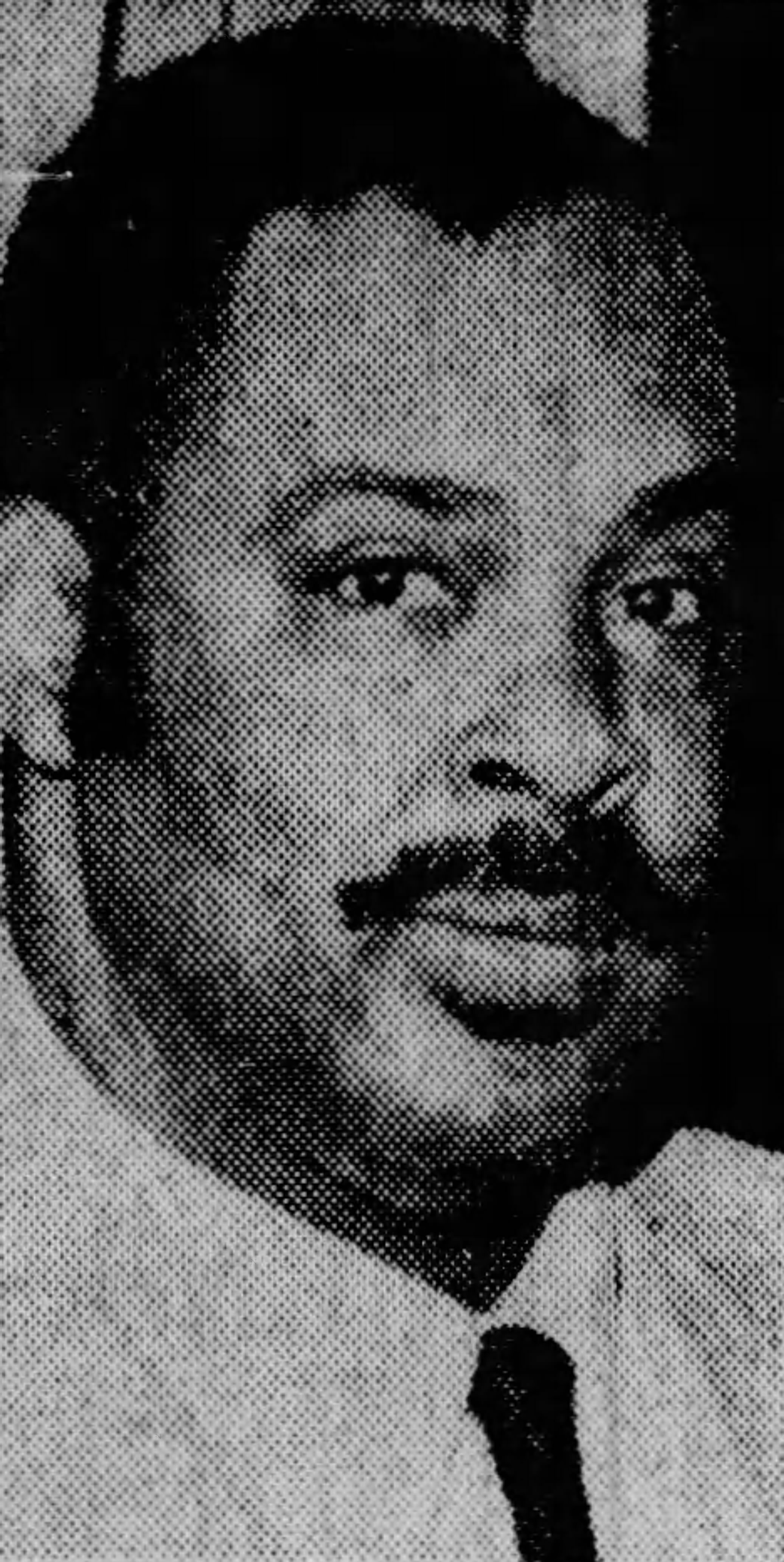

Member of the Maryland House of Delegates from the 2nd Baltimore district
- In office December 1972 – July 13, 1973
- Appointed by: Marvin Mandel
- Preceded by: Floyd B. Adams
- Succeeded by: Hattie N. Harrison

Personal details
- Died: July 13, 1973 (aged 48) Baltimore, Maryland, U.S.
- Cause of death: Shooting
- Party: Democratic
- Spouse: Cecelia Penny Barnes (m. 1953; died 2004)
- Children: 1
- Occupation: Bail bondsman

James Aubrey "Turk" Scott Jr. (died July 13, 1973) (Note: Scott's year of birth is unclear. The Baltimore Sun reported in December 1972 that Scott was 37 years old, but reports from April 1973 to July 1973 that he was 48 years old.) was an American politician who was a member of the Maryland House of Delegates from December 1972 until his assassination on July 13, 1973.

In April 1973, Scott was charged with arranging for the transportation of about 40 pounds (18 kg) of heroin between New York and Baltimore during 1971 and 1972. He was set to stand trial on August 20, but was assassinated by individuals claiming to be affiliated with a group called Black October on July 13, 1973. Sherman Dobson was charged with his murder shortly afterwards, but was acquitted on murder charges in December 1975. Scott's murder remains unsolved.

== Background ==
Before entering politics, Scott worked as a bail bondsman and was involved in efforts to promote the Laurel Jazz Festival in 1968 and 1969.

Scott unsuccessfully ran for the Maryland House of Delegates in 1970 and applied to fill a legislative vacancy in 1971, but withdrew before a nominee was selected, saying that he didn't want to disrupt the alliance between the Black and White political clubs that dominated the district. In December 1972, following the death of state delegate Floyd B. Adams, the Baltimore City Democratic Central Committee unanimously voted to nominate Scott to serve the remainder of Adams's term.

== Federal charges ==
On April 2, 1973, Scott was arrested by federal agents on charges that he and Charles "Piggy" Sedgewick had arranged the transportation of almost 40 pounds of heroin between New York and Baltimore during 1971 and 1972. According to prosecutors, the heroin was bought from the southern district of New York and was worth about $10 million when it was sold in Baltimore. Scott was also charged with seven other charges of using the telephone illegally in furtherance of the conspiracy, three charges of possessing heroin illegally, and three charges of traveling with the intent to further heroin distribution. Five other individuals were named as co-conspirators in the indictment, but were not charged by prosecutors. Scott declined to resign following his arrest, but said that he would not attend the final four days of that year's legislative session, and claimed that his charges were motivated by "political ambitions to embarrass" Governor Marvin Mandel and his administration. Scott pleaded innocent to the charges on April 12, and his trial was set for August 20.

Following Scott's arrest, Mandel maintained that he had no knowledge that Scott was under investigation at the time of his nomination and "had no choice" but to appoint Scott to the seat after the Baltimore City Democratic Central Committee voted to nominate him. The governor had previously refused to appoint Scott to a seat on the Baltimore City Liquor Board, which a spokesperson said was because of his involvement with gambling. In May 1973, Mandel implemented a new policy in requiring police to conduct background investigations of candidates for appointment to the Maryland General Assembly. Frank DeFilippo, Mandel's communications director, admitted to The Baltimore Sun that the new policy was "a result of the Turk Scott incident".

In May 1973, Scott's attorneys motioned to suppress wiretap evidence against Scott, claiming that assistant U.S. attorney Frank Brocato told reporters about the heroin probe involving Scott. Brocato admitted to this in federal court a few days later, adding that he had promised Joe Nawrozki and Michael Olesker, both of the Baltimore News-American, a "scoop" on the indictment if they delayed printing the information, but denied giving the reporters any specific information from the wiretaps. In June 1973, Judge Frank A. Kaufman ruled that the wiretap could be admitted as evidence.

Trial testimony began on June 20, 1973. Norman "Pookie" Coleman, an admitted heroin dealer who was cited as a co-conspirator in drug charges brought against Scott, and two of his brothers testified that Scott supplied him "on a consignment basis" with kilograms of heroin for resale, which Scott said was a lie made up by witnesses "trying to save their own hides". Scott further testified that he knew Coleman, but that their relationship was limited to dealings involving his bail bond business.

== Assassination ==
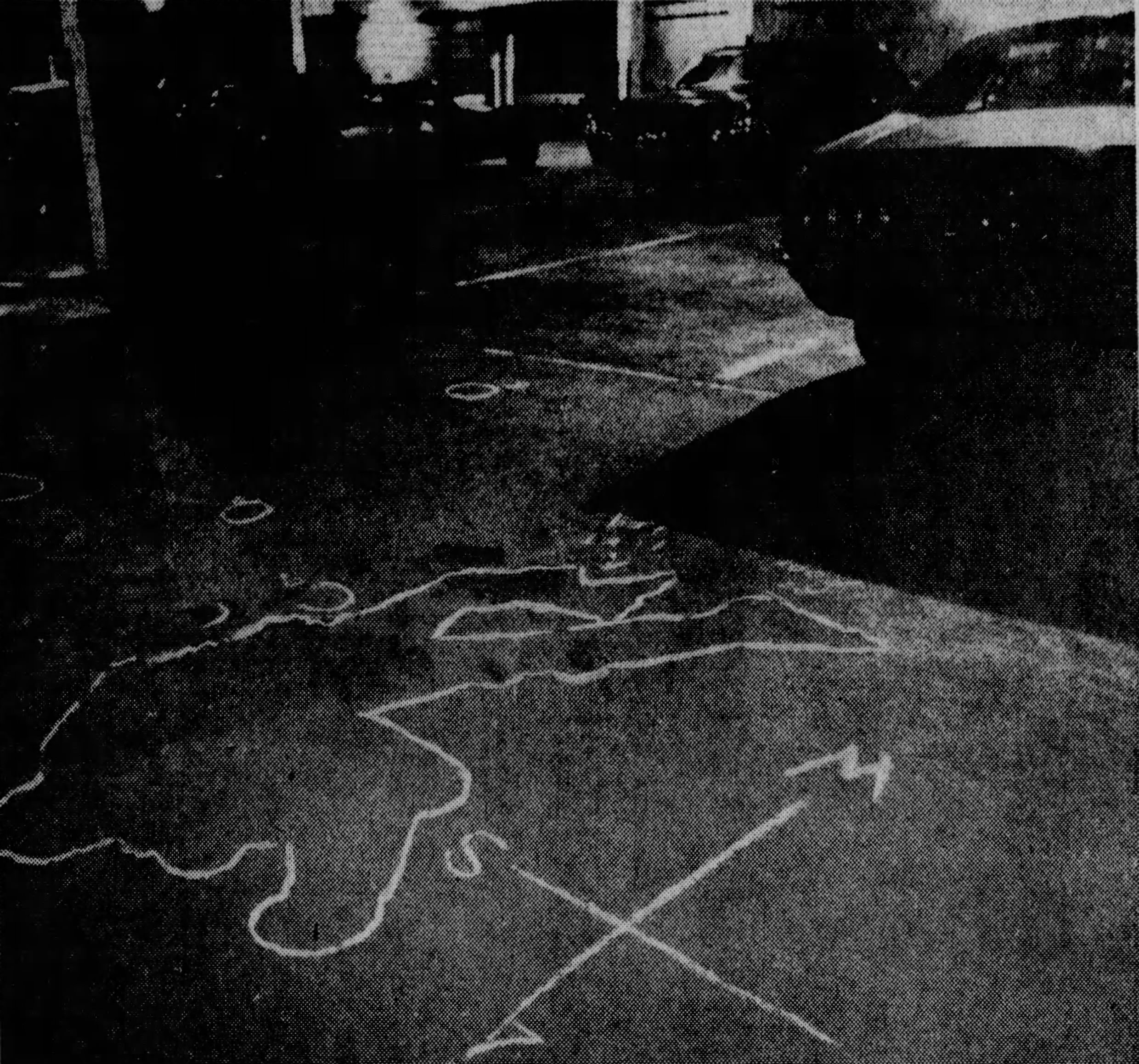
The location where Scott's body was found

On July 13, 1973, Scott was found dead in the parking garage of the Sutton Place apartment complex located in the Bolton Hill neighborhood of Baltimore. A preliminary examination showed that Scott was killed by two shotgun blasts—one in the chest and another in the side—and was also shot in the back and chest with a small caliber handgun. Scott also had a large, unexplained gash on his throat and had a broken left leg. According to the police report, two 12-gauge shotgun shells were found about five feet from Scott's body and several .22 caliber shells were recovered 40 feet from the body.

The Baltimore City Democratic Central Committee unanimously voted to nominate committee member Hattie N. Harrison to succeed Scott on July 27. She was appointed to the legislature by Governor Mandel on August 2, 1973.

=== Black October involvement ===
About 35 pieces of paper were found scattered around the garage where Scott was killed. Several of the fliers depicted a hand-drawn machine gun and large letters reading "Black October", with other sheets reading "Black October Off the Pusher" and "Selling drugs is an act of treason, the penalty for treason is Death." "Black October" was reported to be the slogan used by a group of Vietnam War veterans who have vowed to execute narcotics dealers in the Black community, with several instances of the slogan having been spray-painted onto the sides of buildings in east Baltimore for several months leading up to Scott's assassination.

Scott's body was found by another Sutton Place resident at 1:30 a.m. At 1:40 a.m., a reporter for The Baltimore Sun received an anonymous phone call from an individual claiming to be a member of Black October; in the phone call, the individual credits Scott's murder to the Black October group and describes the weapons used in the killing and where Scott's body could be found before abruptly hanging up. Later that day, The Baltimore Sun received another phone call claiming that Scott gave his killers the names of several large-scale heroin dealers moments before he was murdered, with the caller adding that they "could never have gotten these names form any other source and some of them will be our next targets".

On July 18, an individual with a voice appearing to be identical to the voice of the previous Black October calls once again called The Baltimore Sun to report the death of George L. Evans, who was shot to death in the Pimlico neighborhood of Baltimore. The caller once again credits Black October with the killing, describes what weapon was used and where the body could be found, and claims that Evans was targeted for selling drugs. Evans's body was surrounded by leaflets identical to those found around Scott's body. On July 19, Baltimore Sun reporter Jerome Mondesire received another anonymous call from an individual claiming to represent Black October saying that the gun used to kill Evans was the same weapon used to kill Scott. A typewritten statement was also left in Mondesire's doorway explaining Black October's philosophy toward drugs, citing crime statistics and police corruption, and calling on members of the Black community to support the group's cause.

=== Investigation ===
Baltimore police theorized that Scott was shot to death by a group of taxi cab-hijacking killers who rehearsed their murder scheme on June 19, when John Richard Meredith, a Royal Cab taxi driver, had his car hijacked for approximately five hours while he was being held captive. Other police officials theorized that Scott was killed to "shut him up", however, federal officials discounted this theory, saying that Scott had given them no reason to expect his cooperation at any point during the investigation and subsequent trial.

On July 19, police arrested and charged 20-year-old Sherman W. Dobson with the murder of Scott. A police search of Dobson's house uncovered a pistol, a shotgun, Black October literature, handcuffs, and a typewriter. Police initially claimed that the pistol was used in Scott's murder, but later said that the revolver was not used in neither Scott's nor Evans's murders. Officials later said that Dobson's fingerprints matched with those found on a piece of Black October literature left at the scene of Scott's murder. Dobson pleaded innocent to the charges on October 5, and his trial was set for November 19. During trial testimony, Dobson was positively identified as one of three bandits who kidnapped and a cab driver and stole his vehicle, and police testified that Dobson's palm prints were found on a partial copy of the Baltimore News-American found near Scott's body. Dobson declined to take the stand shortly before his attorneys announced that they rested their case. On December 12, the jury acquitted Dobson in Scott's killing, but convicted him of related charges of armed robbery, kidnapping, illegal use of a firearm, and receiving stolen goods. Dobson was sentenced to 15 years in prison, but later had his sentence overturned by the Maryland Court of Special Appeals. In October 1975, Dobson entered into a guilty plea, accepting a 90-day sentence for his stolen gun charges in exchange for the state dropping his kidnapping and robbery charges.

The investigation into Scott's and Evans's murders stalled for months due to a lack of leads. Milton B. Allen, the state's attorney of Baltimore, told The Baltimore Sun that although police had an idea of who they wanted, their evidence was weak and that police were "waiting now for someone to give a break" to give them the information they needed.

== Personal life ==
Scott married his wife, Cecelia Penny Barnes, on April 8, 1953. Together, they had a daughter, Tina Scott, who was 19 years old at the time of his death. Cecelia Penny Scott was a businesswoman and philanthropist who owned Cecelia's, a nightclub in the District, worked in the administrations of mayors Walter Washington and Marion Barry, and supported initiatives to help needy families, including Hospitality House. She died after a short illness in Washington, D.C., on April 23, 2004.

In July 1974, Tina Scott filed a $30 million negligence lawsuit against Sutton Place apartments. In July 1976, the Maryland Court of Appeals ruled for the owners of Sutton Place Apartments, holding that landlords were under no obligation to protect their tenants from crime, but must exercise "reasonable care" on their behalf.
