= Tripier =

Tripier is a French surname. It is an occupational surname derived from the French word tripier, which means tripe seller or tripe butcher.

Notable people with the surname include:

- Jeanne Tripier (1869–1944), French spiritualist and artist
- Raymond Tripier (1838–1916), French physician and pathologist

== See also ==
- Trippier, surname
