= Eugenio Santoro =

Italian painter

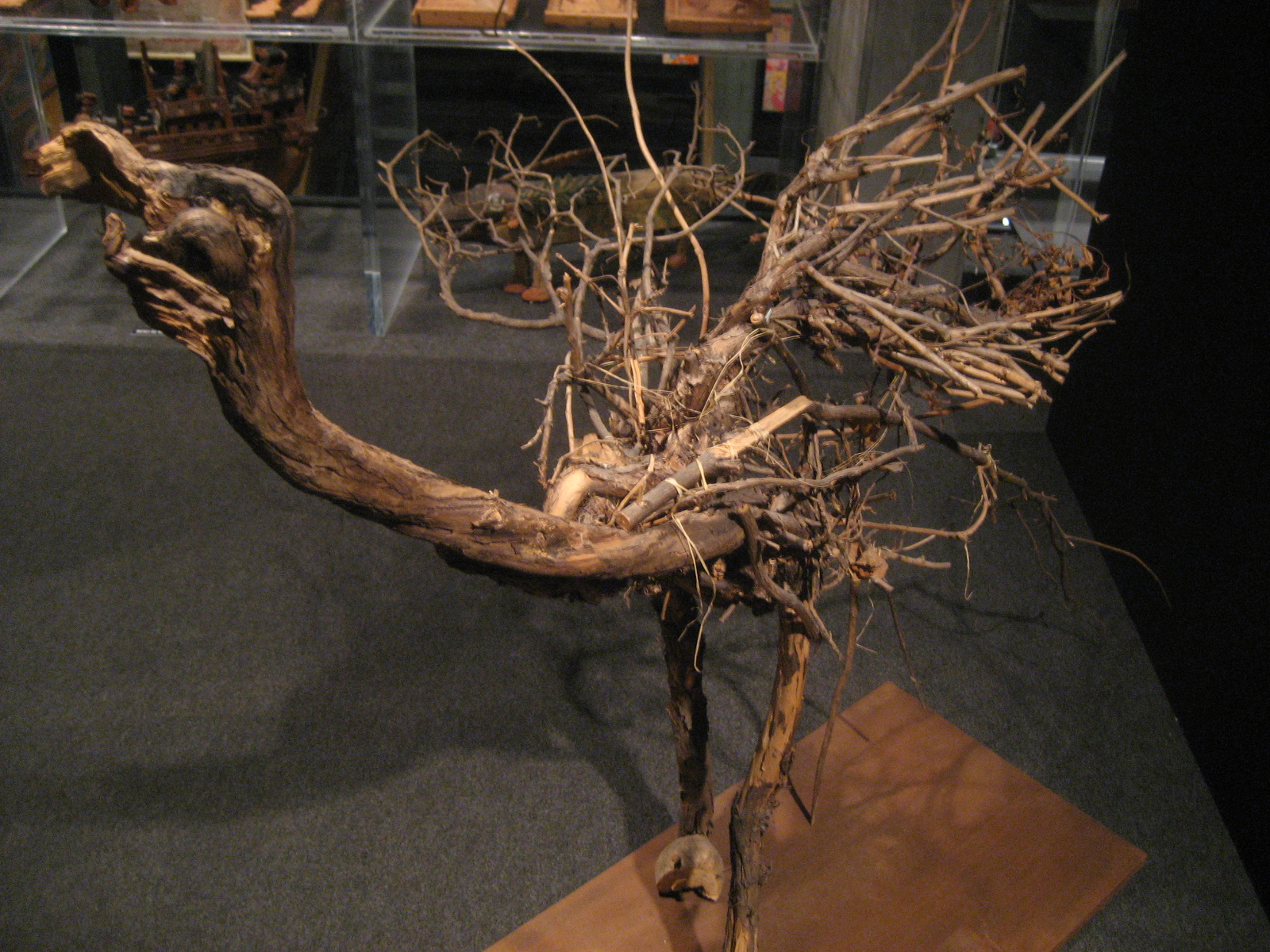
- Eugenio Santoro's bird made from twigs and branches
- Born: 27 August 1920; Castelmezzano, Italy
- Died: 13 May 2006 (aged 85); Courtelary, Switzerland
- Known for: Sculpture, Painting

Eugenio Santoro (27 August 1920 – 13 May 2006), was an Italian-born Swiss outsider artist.

== Biography ==
Born in Castelmezzano, in the province of Potenza (Basilicata), he started working as a carpenter but had to quit his job to go to the front during World War II. He fought in Albania and Greece, but got arrested and deported to Germany, where he was sentenced to hard labour in the Rhineland for two years.

Santoro was released in 1944 and returned to his native town, where he worked as a municipal employee and then as an owner of a small woodworking shop. In 1964, due to financial difficulties, he moved to Switzerland with his wife, finding employment as a labourer at the chocolate factory "Camille Bloch" in Courtelary.

His passion for art began in 1979, with a painting of the factory; then he turned to sculpture. His works are mostly wooden sculptures depicting human and animal figures. His works include Mary Magdalene (1984) and The Egyptienne (1989). The first exhibition of his sculptures was held in 1986 at the "Espace Noir" of Saint-Imier, chaired by Maurice Born.

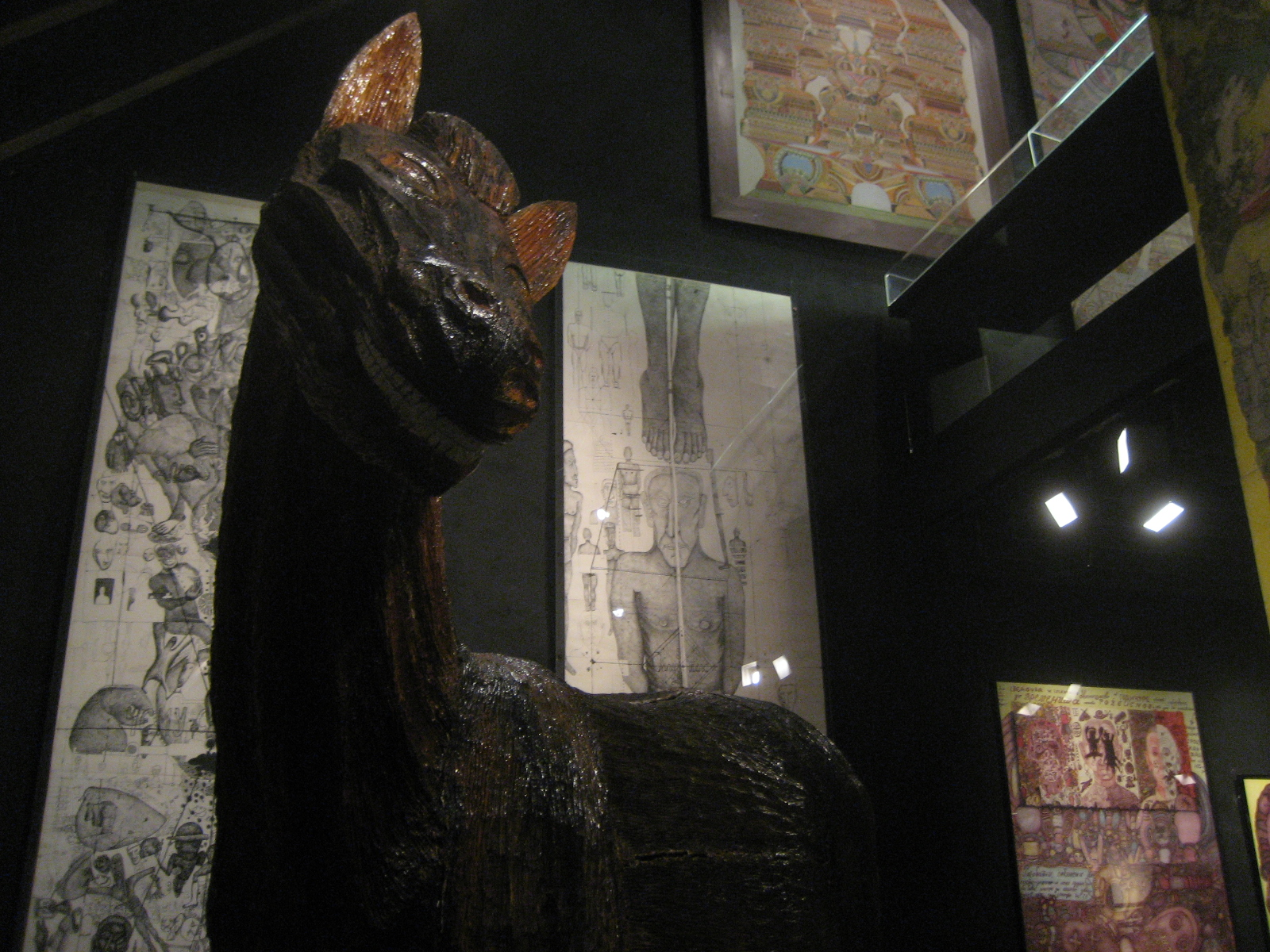
Eugenio Santoro - Grinning horse

Three years later, Born introduced him to Michel Thévoz, curator of the Collection de l'art brut in Lausanne, who organized a permanent exhibition of his works. In 2004, a second exhibition was organized in the same place. Santoro died at Courtelary in 2006.

== Bibliography ==
- Lucienne Peiry, Art brut: the origins of outsider art, Flammarion, 2001
- Michel Thévoz, Collection de l'art brut, Lausanne, Institut suisse pour l'étude de l'art, 2001

== See also ==
- List of Outsider artists
