= Rothéneuf =

Coordinates: 48°40′55″N 1°58′5″W

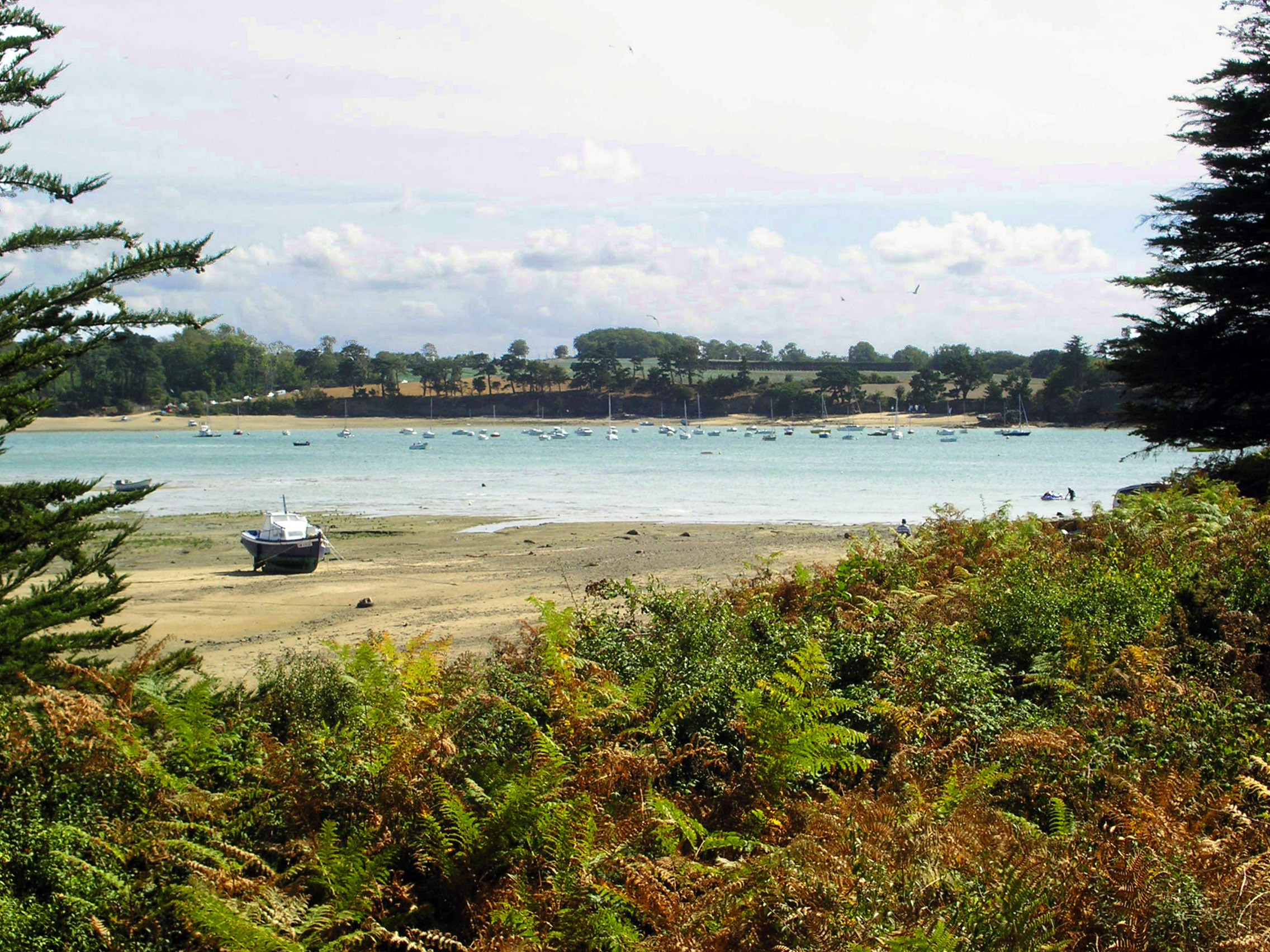
Havre de Rothéneuf seen from the Besnard island

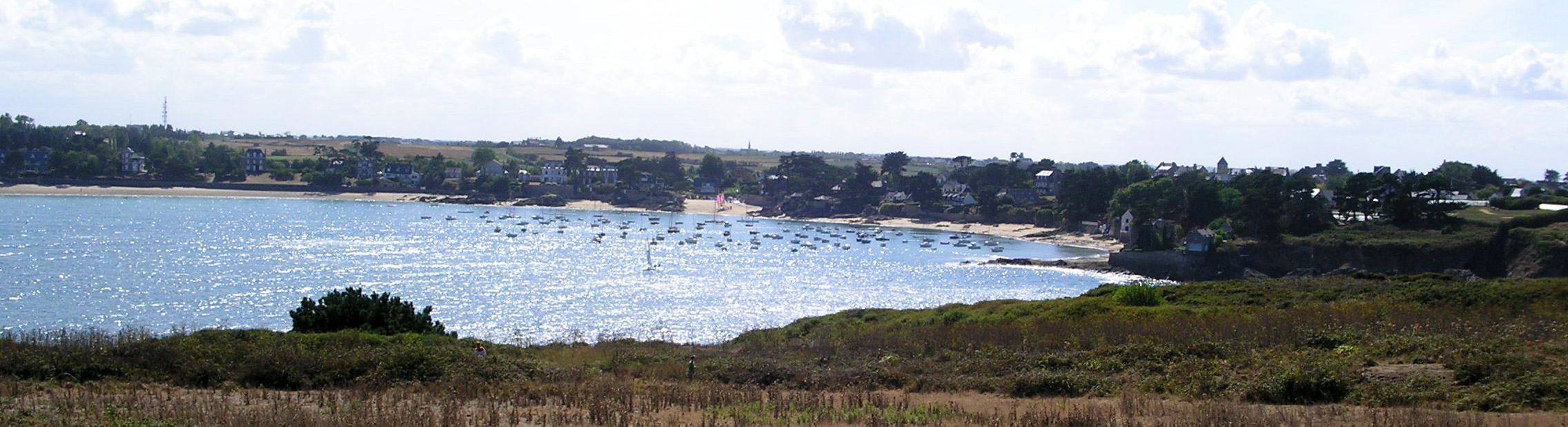
Panorama of the Havre de Rothéneuf seen from the Besnard island (Rothéneuf village is on the right)

Rothéneuf (French pronunciation: [ʁɔtenœf]) is a village in the north west of France, situated north-east from Saint-Malo, about five kilometres alongside the coast. Administratively, it is part of the commune of Saint-Malo, in the département of Ille-et-Vilaine.

The village is a seaside resort but is famous for its sculpted rocks, "rochers sculptés". Abbé Fouré (1839–1910), having suffered a stroke in 1894, which left him paralyzed on one side, retreated to a life as a hermit in the cliffs of Rothéneuf. He carved over 300 grotesque and bizarre faces and figures into the rock.

The navigator and explorer Jacques Cartier, who is credited with being the first European discoverer of the St. Lawrence River and the first European to make a map of the Gulf of St. Lawrence, was born in Rothéneuf, where he spent the last years of his life as well. His estate, Limoëlou, in Rothéneuf, was turned into museum.
