= Robert Sundholm =

American artist

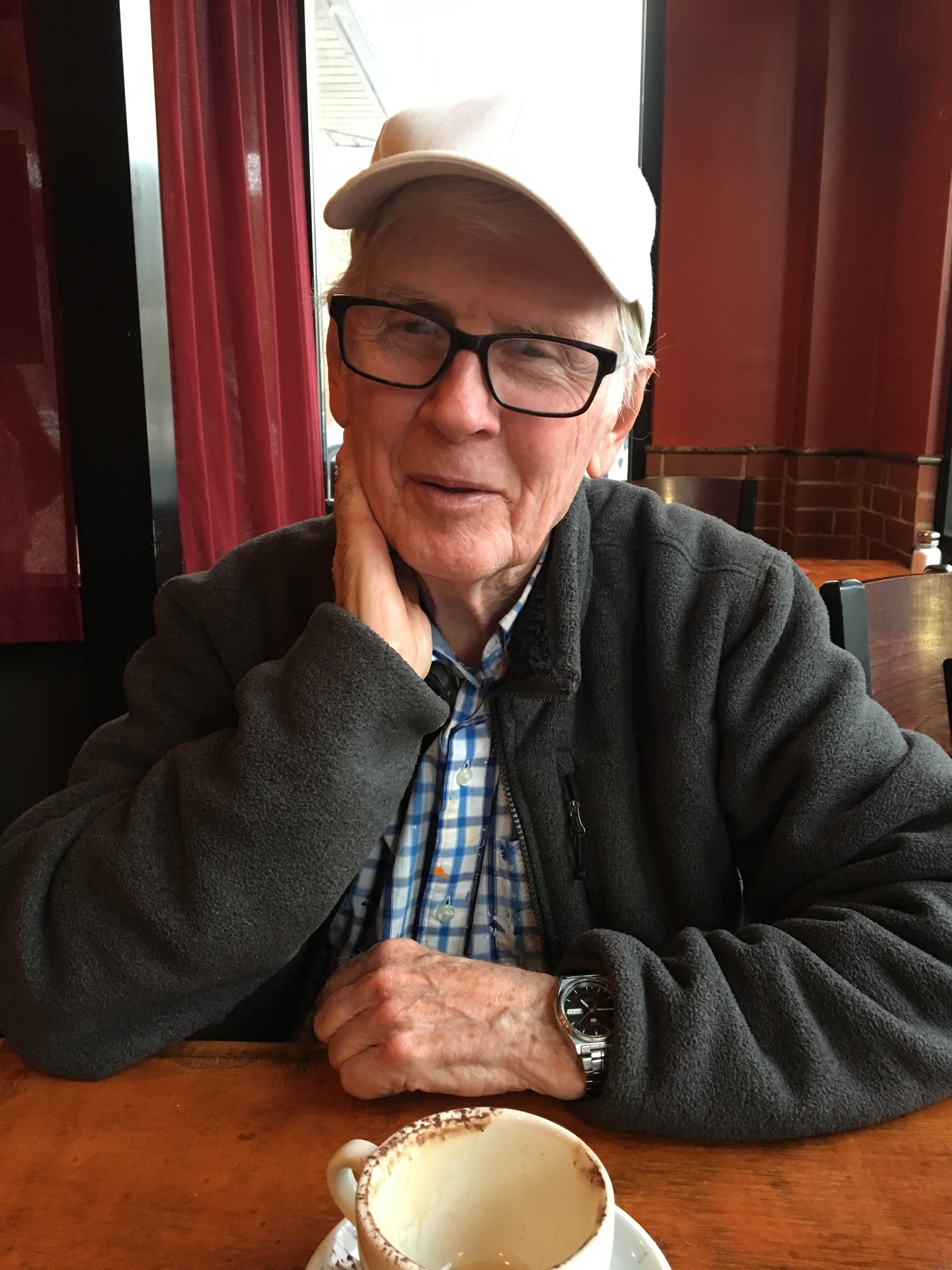
Robert Sundholm

Robert Sundholm (born 1941) was an outsider artist. Died 4/29/2023 A resident of North Bergen, New Jersey, Sundholm became a janitor at the North Bergen town hall and taped his work along the corridor walls. He was discovered in 2009 by an attorney/artist Daniel Belardinelli who curated his first show. His most recent milestones include being curated at the Outsider Art Fair 1/17 as well as being the subject of a video and article for People magazine. Additionally Sundholm donated 21 paintings to the Hanover Charity Benefit hosted by Vanessa Noel. https://www.legacy.com/us/obituaries/name/robert-sundholm-obituary?id=51769400
