= Philadelphia Wireman =

Unidentified outsider artist

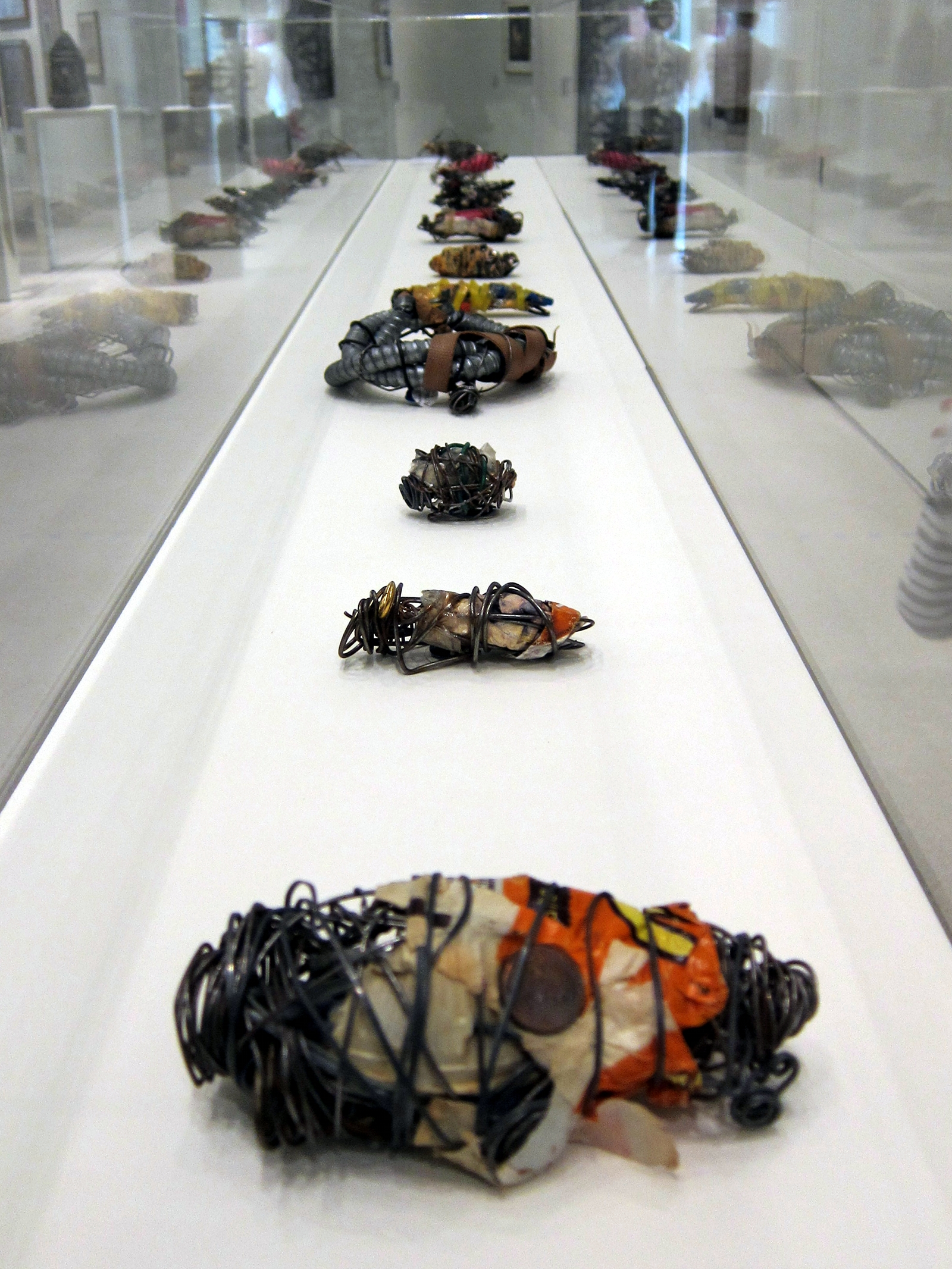
Work by the Philadelphia Wireman at the Lille Métropole Museum of Modern, Contemporary and Outsider Art

The Philadelphia Wireman is the working name given to an unknown outsider artist responsible for approximately 1,200 small-scale wire-frame sculptures that were found by a passerby, abandoned on a street outside a transient home in Philadelphia, Pennsylvania in 1982. The artist is assumed to have access to the tools required to bend some of the heavy-gauge wire in the sculptures; it is hypothesised that the sculptures were abandoned after their creator's death. Nothing is known about the artist's motives. Many of the pieces resemble African art, and this plus the demographics of the neighborhood where the art collection was found have led some reviewers to speculate that the artist was African-American. In 1999, according to the Fleisher-Ollman Gallery, a gallery visitor correctly identified the street that the art was found on, and confirmed that he had seen an elderly black man making these sculptures circa 1970, but beyond that the artist has never been identified.

== Composition of collection ==
The passerby, Robert Leitch, gave the work to the Fleisher-Ollman Gallery in Philadelphia, which currently holds some of the work. Nearly all the works are wire-bound bundles, except a few abstract marker drawings reminiscent both of Mark Tobey and John Bunion Murray. The artist tightly wound wire around objects including plastic, packaging, nuts, bolts, newspaper/magazine cutouts, electrical parts, batteries, coins and other items. Some bundles used rubber bands or tape to bind the objects together. Based on internal evidence, the collection has been dated to around 1970.

== Exhibitions ==
The collection was first exhibited in 1985 at the Fleisher/Ollman Gallery. They have since been shown in venues including the Contemporary Arts Center, Cincinnati; the San Jose Museum of Art; the Musée d’Art Brut, Lausanne; the Pittsburgh Center for the Arts; the Museum for African Art, New York; the Institute of Contemporary Art, Philadelphia; and the American Folk Art Museum, New York.

== Motivations ==
The artist's unusual, possibly monomaniacal devotion to the particular demands of his chosen form has led to comparisons with artist Henry Darger. Exhibitors of the artwork frequently compare its construction process to that of Native American medicine bundles or African tribal fetish objects. One art historian has critiqued this tendency to attribute religious or psychological motivations to an unknown artist, writing that "fixations with alterity, especially through the narrating of oddities and difference, have long overshadowed [outsider] artworks and in many cases, the artist’s voice."
