= Trippier =

Trippier is an English surname. It is an occupational surname derived from the French word tripier, which means tripe seller or tripe butcher.

Notable people with the surname include:

- David Trippier (born 1945), British politician and author
- Kieran Trippier (born 1990), English footballer

== See also ==
- Tripier, surname
