= Adolphe Julian Fouéré =

French artist and priest (1839–1910)

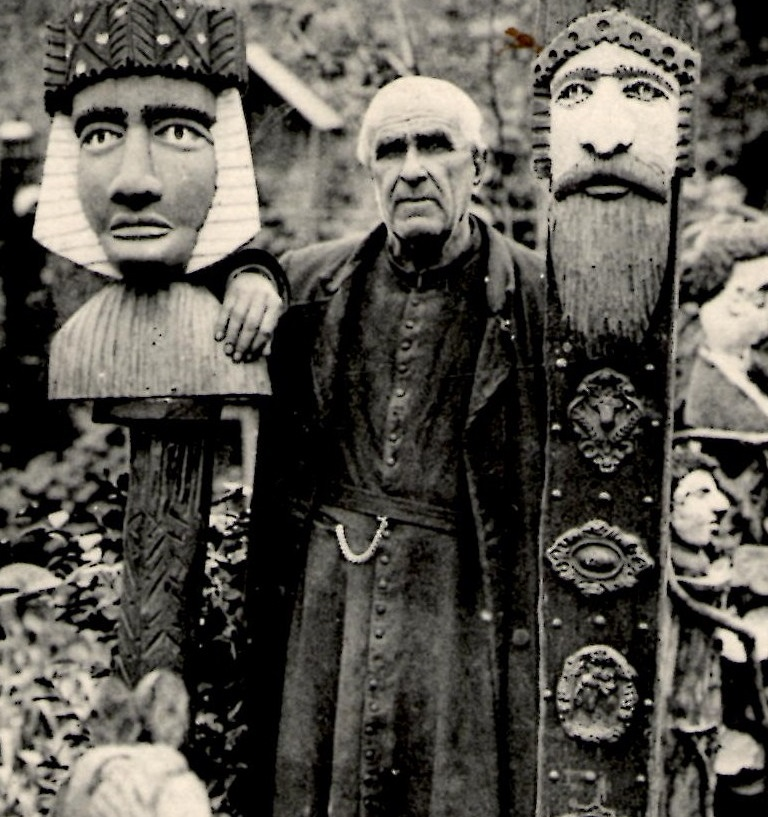
- Born: 4 September 1839; Saint-Thual, Brittany, France
- Died: 10 February 1910 (aged 70); Rothéneuf, Brittany, France

Adolphe Julian Fouéré (4 September 1839 – 10 February 1910), also known as L'Abbé Fouré ("Abbot Fouré" in French), was a French artist and priest. Considered to be an outsider artist, he is mainly known for the Rock Statues of Rothéneuf.

== Early life ==
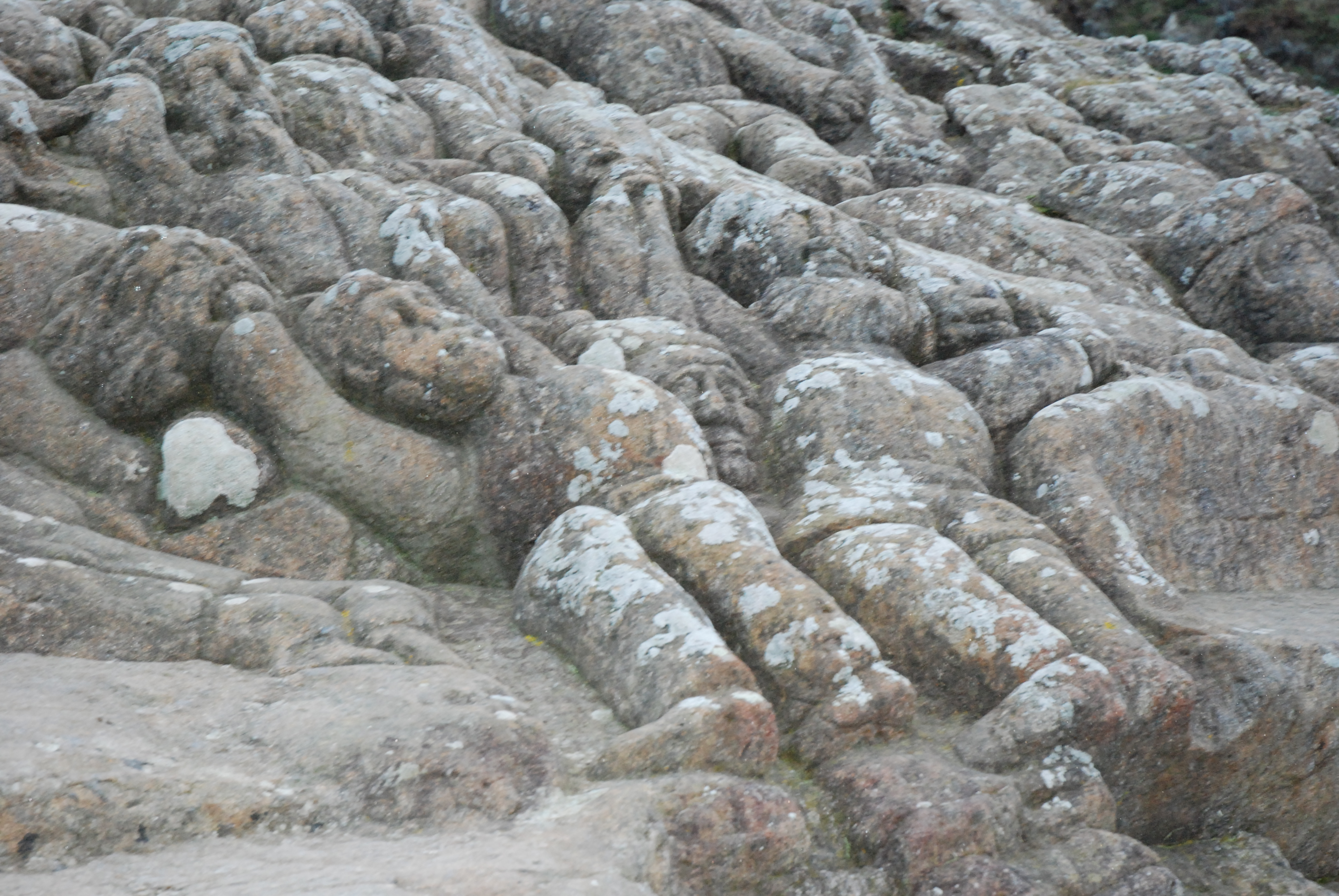
Detail from The rock sculptures of Rothéneuf (1894-1907)

He was born in 1839 to an innkeeper father in Saint-Thual. Fouéré studied in the small seminary of Saint-Méen-le-Grand before continuing his training in the great seminary in Rennes. At that time he took up the pseudonym "Fouré".

== Career ==
He was ordained a priest on 19 December 1863. He was appointed successively from 1864 to 1877 as curate at Paimpont, where he ministered to the chapel of Saint-Éloi-des-Forges. He supported the striking workers of the blast furnaces in Brocéliande, which were about to shut down due to the opening of international trade by Napoleon III and technological innovation. He met the owner of the forge, Henri d'Orléans, Duke of Aumale, who was exiled to England after the revolution of 1848. However, his efforts were in vain.

From 1877 to 1881, he was curate at Guipry, from 1881 to 1887, he was rector of Forges-la-Forêt and from 1887 to 1889, he was rector at Maxent. In Februar 1889, he was appointed rector of the parish of Langouët.

In 1894, Father Fouré suffered a stroke, which caused partial hearing loss. This served as a pretext for the church to oust him, despite a petition by the parishioners, for Fouré was a militant. It's possible that corruption was involved. According to Joëlle Jouneau, head of cultural projects in the Association of Friends of the Works of Abbot Fouré: "Deafness is the official reason, but it's more complex. The abbot wouldn't have protected a person who would steal from the parish coffers."

He retired to Rothéneuf, where he lived in a small house a few steps from the shore and lived on a meager priest's pension. He had the status of a "regular priest". That is to say, he was technically a priest, but without administrative duties. At that point he became a recluse and was nicknamed "The Hermit of Rothéneuf".

At that point, he devoted his life to art. He began to decorate his house, which he called Haute Folie ("High Madness"), with wooden sculptures. He created a garden decorated with over 200 painted figures. For 13 to 14 years, he carved rocks by the sea, using a chisel and a hammer, first at Pointe du Christ, and later at Pointe du la Haie. The sculpted rocks depicted the Breton saints Budoc and Gobrien de Vannes. The latter ended his life as a hermit and was therefore chosen by Father Fouré as his patron saint. He depicted historical figures such as Napoleon, Cleopatra, and the Queen of Sheba, alongside events of his own time, like the Boer War. His sculptures were originally colored, but were later bleached by wind and sun. His rock sculptures are slowly disappearing due to erosion.

He is quoted to say:

In the last ten years, I have become hard of hearing in order to isolate myself from the world. One day I became totally deaf; I was told that times had changed. I have retired here. I help out on Sundays at the parish, as an old curator of a young priest. But this is not enough activity, and I have to keep myself busy. So I thought of going to the edge of the cliffs to talk to the ocean, my old friend. I cannot hear others anymore but I can hear the waves. And I began to sculpt the stone on a daily basis.

— Adolphe Julian Fouéré

Stricken with paralysis and speech difficulties, he forced to cease his activities in 1907. He ended his days in the house, where he died on 10 February 1910.
