= Tsang Tsou-choi =

Hong Kong artist

- Tsang at age 78
- Born: Tsang Choi; 12 November 1921; Koyiu (Gaoyao), Kwangtung (Guangdong), Republic of China
- Died: 15 July 2007 (aged 85); Kowloon Hospital, Hong Kong
- Occupation: Calligraphy artist
- Spouse: Man Fok-choi (b. 1936)
- Children: 8

Tsang Tsou-choi
- Traditional Chinese: 曾灶財
- Simplified Chinese: 曾灶财
- Hanyu Pinyin: Zēng Zàocái
- Yale Romanization: Jàng Jou-chòih
- Jyutping: Zang1 Zou3-coi4

Emperor of Kowloon
- Traditional Chinese: 九龍皇帝
- Simplified Chinese: 九龙皇帝
- Hanyu Pinyin: Jiǔlóng Huángdì
- Yale Romanization: Gáu lùhng wòhng dai
- Jyutping: Gau^{2} lung^{4} wong^{4} dai^{3}

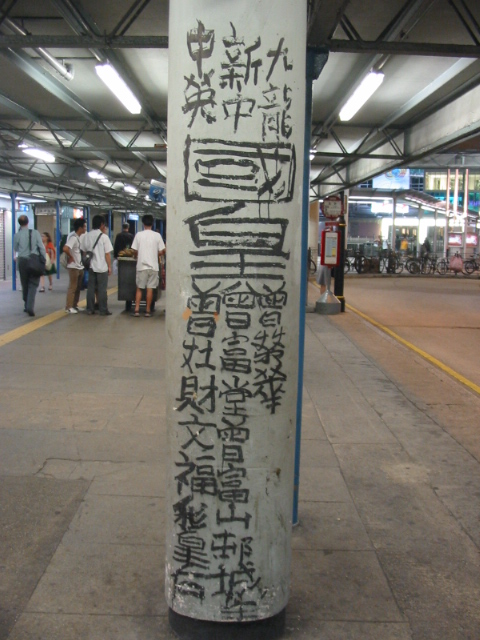
One of Tsang's public art works at Tsim Sha Tsui Star Ferry Pier (c. 2005)

Tsang Tsou-choi (Chinese: 曾灶財), commonly referred to as the "Emperor of Kowloon" (九龍皇帝) (12 November 1921 – 15 July 2007) was a Hong Kong citizen known for his distinctive calligraphy graffiti.

== Early years ==
Tsang was born in Liantang Village (蓮塘村), Koyiu (Gaoyao), Shiuhing (Zhaoqing), Kwangtung (Guangdong), Republic of China. He travelled to Hong Kong at the age of 16 as a worker, poor and barely literate. He began to mark the streets of Hong Kong with his distinctive graffiti at the age of 35. He claimed that he had studied his ancestral tree and discovered that most of the land of Kowloon belonged to his ancestors. He said that Kowloon belonged to his grandfather. There are no records to back up Tsang's claim.

== His artwork ==
He was arrested for his graffiti several times; however, the police usually just gave him a warning or a small fine. His family disowned him, saying he was mentally unbalanced and a public nuisance and his wife had grown tired of his obsession and left him.

Although his graffiti was repeatedly painted over, he often returned to re-apply his messages as soon as the paint dried. At the height of his graffiti career, his obsessive marking of territory made his graffiti an ever-present aspect of the streets of Hong Kong. The graffiti has been spotted at many places on the streets of Hong Kong, ranging from lampposts, utility boxes, pillars, pavements, street furniture, and building walls, to an occasional car. The contents of his calligraphic graffiti usually include his name, his title (Emperor or King of Kowloon, Hong Kong, or China), his family tree (a variable list of about 20 individuals), the names of illustrious emperors, and the exclamation, "Down with the Queen of England!" His complaints about the supposed misappropriation of his land were not always so formulaic, however. He occasionally demanded that the government pay him land taxes.

A Hong Kong magazine named him one of the city's ten least influential people. However, this supposed lack of influence does not extend to the art world. His calligraphy has inspired many fashion designers, art directors, interior decorators, and CD cover artists. His style has also informed the work of traditional artists, such as Oscar Ho. He appeared in a commercial for Swipe cleaner, in which he cleans away his permanent ink graffiti, proclaiming the product's effectiveness to Hong Kong consumers.

During his last years, he lived in a retirement home, and no longer wrote on walls. However, his poor health did not entirely halt his calligraphic efforts. He continued his work on paper, household linens, and other mundane items. He also told visitors that he should have been elected chief executive of Hong Kong, instead of Donald Tsang, that "impostor".

He received international recognition for his work. Photographs of his work have toured in shows, such as "Power of the Word", which began its US tour at Grinnell College's Faulconer Gallery on 6 October 2000. In 2000, he appeared in Clarence Fok's film Queen of Kowloon and in 2001, he appeared in Fruit Chan's film Hollywood Hong Kong. In 2003, he was included in the Venice Biennale. His first major commercial recognition came when Sotheby's auctioned a board, painted by Tsang, for HK$55,000 (US$7,050) on 31 October 2004.

He died on 15 July 2007 following a heart attack in Hong Kong. He was 85. Art critic Lau Kin-wai said Tsang spent his final days at an elderly home surrounded by family members. He also said that Tsang's last wish was for another exhibition of his work.

In 2011, Hong Kong curator Joel Chung Yin-chai curated the exhibition "Memories of King Kowloon" at Artistree, Taikoo Place. The exhibition exhibited many of Tsang's handwritten works and some of his belongings. Some of his work has been acquired by the M+ museum in West Kowloon.

== Legacy ==
When news of his death became known, many people went to take pictures of his work, especially the one in Tsim Sha Tsui Star Ferry Pier (because of the convenience of the location), which was later sprayed with a clear protective layer. Many worried that the government would 'clean up' his remaining public artwork. The Hong Kong authorities promised this would not happen and undertook to analyse ways of preserving his works. However, in 2009 there were protests and questions in Legco regarding the apparent failure of the government to prevent the removal and overpainting of much of his legacy. The Home Affairs Bureau maintained the government's commitment to protecting Tsang's works "depending on the actual situation and feasibility".

On 23 April 2021, one of the king of Kowloon's pieces on Kwun Tong bridge, that was getting renovated after being vandalized, was vandalized again in the same fashion, allegedly by pro-Beijing supporters.

Tsang has been featured significantly in Hong Kong culture, including the 1993 Beyond song Desting is Your Home (樂與怒), as well as the King of Kowloon (九龍皇帝) by DJ Lorry.

Tsang's contribution to Hong Kong culture is documented in Dr Helena Wu's book The Hangover after the Handover: Places, Things and Cultural Icons in Hong Kong, which dedicates an entire chapter to him.

== See also ==
- List of outsider artists
- Samer Peerachai
