= John Bunion Murray =

African American painter (1908–1988)

- J.B. Murray standing outside his home in Sandersville, Georgia
- Born: John Bunion Murray; 1908; Glascock County, Georgia, U.S.
- Died: 1988 (aged 79–80); Sandersville, Georgia, U.S.
- Known for: Painting and drawing
- Movement: Modern Art

John Bunion (J.B.) Murray (also spelled Murry; 1908–1988) was an abstract expressionist painter from Glascock County, GA. His work has been shown among folk art exhibitions and is included at the American Folk Art Museum and the Smithsonian American Art Museum, and has been featured in many museum exhibitions, including "Self-Taught Genius" at AFAM and "When the Stars Begin to Fall" at the Studio Museum. His work is best known for its codified use of colors and improvised script, called "spirit script," which could only be translated by the artist.

== Early life ==
John Bunion (J.B.) Murray was born to John H. Murray and Moriah Macrae M. Bass in Glascock County, Georgia in the remote town of Mitchell. He attended school for one month at the age of six, then spent the rest of his life as a general farm laborer. Murray was unable to read or write in English. He married his neighbor, Chloe Kitchens, in his early twenties. Murray built a house in the neighboring town of Sandersville. He and his wife had eleven children, five of whom died within Murray's lifetime. By the time he was in his fifties, his wife had left him. Aside from doctor's visits and weekly services at the Mineral Springs Baptist Church, Murray lived in virtual isolation for the remaining two decades of his life. He died in 1988 of prostate cancer.

== Religion and art ==
At the age of 70, Murray began what art historian William Arnett has called "one of the most remarkable and unlikely art 'careers' in the southern vernacular field" after he and his wife separated. After a decade of living alone, Murray dislocated his hip, and was forced to retire from farming and seek new existential perspectives. His first creations were shrinelike piles of found materials, rocks, and other debris strategically placed throughout his yard to repel evil that Murray believed loomed over all facets of life. He then began painting car parts, televisions, and other reflective material that he would then affix to his home in another effort to reflect evil and protect his home. The tradition of adorning one's yard with sculptures and totems, otherwise known as the "yard show," was a very common practice among African American artists, particularly from the south eastern United States. Other artists from northern Georgia, such as Eldren M. Bailey, Dilmus Hall, Ralph Griffin, and Howard Finster all created prominent yard shows.

In 1978, Murray experienced a religious vision while watering his potatoes which inspired him to produce a remarkable body of abstract paintings and drawings in the last decade of his life. Seeing an eagle descend from the sun, Murray believed that he had been granted a privileged religious insight, which was to be the inspiration for his work as an artist.

When I started, I prayed and prayed. And the Lord sent a vision from the sun. Everything I see is from the sun. He showed me signs and seasons and he tells me. He turned around and gave me a question to ask Him and I asked Him to see me mother. He brought her before me and two brothers... See, Spirit will talk with Spirit. And when I left there [the hospital], the eagle crossed my eye—a Spiritual Eagle. The Eagle can see farther than any bird in the world and that's why I can see things other people can't see. When I see between here and the sun is in a twinkle. It was then that I began to write these letters. Different writing represents different languages and folks. It's the Language of the Holy Spirit, direct from God"

Illiterate, Murray developed his own personal style of seemingly unintelligible asemic writing, which he called "spirit script," that he inscribed onto his drawings and paintings. Murray's writing gave him a power he believed could be used for benediction and protection of himself and others. As a part of the process, Murray kept a bottle of what he called "holy water" on a table by his bedside, which he would raise towards the sky whenever he prayed. Murray believed that if a person with a pure heart read his "writing" while looking through the bottle of holy water, that person would read messages from God. During the last few years of his life, as his reputation as a mystic grew, Murray would receive visitors on his property who requested ritual readings of the holy water. When writing these holy messages, Murray would often hold the bottle of holy water in one hand and write with the other, keeping his hand as limp as possible, and letting the holy spirit guide it. This process of automatic writing was recorded in a documentary directed and produced by Judith McWillie of the University of Georgia toward the end of his life. Although other deeply religious artists wrote in asemic script, such as Joe Light's pseudo-Arabic and James Hampton's Phoenician-like script, Murray was the only artist known to read and decipher his writings through water.

Many scholars have written about West African spiritual and religious influences on religious practices of the African American descendants of enslaved peoples in the southeastern United States. Murray's work differs from other visionary work in that it has no formal narrative components, and relies primarily on sacred scripts. Thus, despite Murray's commitment to the Baptist Church, scholars have connected Murray's practice with Afro-Islamic traditions. Islamic traditions in western and northern Africa venerate writing, studying and memorizing the Koran and other sacred texts as a power bestowed on man by Allah and can constitute forms of worship. Interpretation and intercession of sacred texts are used to heal practitioners spiritually and physically. Furthermore, some Afro-Islamic mystic leaders dissolve the written words of sacred texts or the name of Allah in water then pour the solution into a small vial, which the practitioner drinks or wears in secret around their neck. In his own way, and without lending credit to the similarity, Murray reflected these Islamic practices when he wrote his prophetic "spirit scripts" and interpreted them through his small glass of water for visiting practitioners.

Murray distrusted people who did not believe in God; in his mind, most people had strayed from the Lord's path and were therefore potentially harmful. He also believed that destructive evil spirits populated the world, and thus much of the artwork he created served a protective purpose. His paintings and painted objects functioned as a shield to ward off such harmful forces. His house never became a site for collectors or art historians, as other folk artists' houses had been. However, as his notoriety progressed, a small group of private patrons began exchanging his completed paintings for new supplies and discouraging him from engaging with other interested collectors. It is unknown how much Murray was compensated for his work, if at all. At the end of his career, he had produced nearly 2,000 paintings.

Art historian Mary Padgelek, who wrote a book about Murray's life and works, has also written a musical about him: Visionary Man, which was presented at the Hudson Mainstage Theater in 2014.

=== Exposure ===
Two people helped expand Murray's range of materials and exposure to viewers. One was his general practitioner, Dr. William Rawlings, a local doctor in Sandersville. The other was Andy Nasisse, an art professor at the University of Georgia. Murray and Dr. William Rawlings met as a result of a routine check up for a minor illness. Murray believed that Rawlings offered more than just physical healing, so he frequented Rawlings' office for mental and spiritual advice. Along with these visits, Murray would send hundreds of paintings and spirit scripts to Rawlings, who then began to supply Murray with higher quality art materials. Murray went from painting on discarded building material with house paint purchased at the local convenience store to painting with tempera paints, markers, watercolors, oil paint sticks, etc.

Murray's greatest advocate may have been Krista Lamar, Dr. Rawlings' wife. She bought supplies for Rawlings to give to Murray and even introduced Murray to Andy Nasisse, an art professor at the University of Georgia. Through Nasisse, Murray was introduced to Phyllis Kind of the Phyllis Kind Gallery in New York. After she agreed to represent Murray in her gallery, his work became internationally known and exhibited around the world.

Once he was diagnosed with prostate cancer in the mid-1980s, he began to make work furiously, feeling as though he was running out of time. This and Murray's increased exposure to medical drawings and hospitals, in accordance with his treatment, altered his work in the last four to five years of his life. His work focused more on warfare and biological uncertainty which Murray felt stirring within him. As a result, his once iconic, compartmentalized style began to blur and serpentine shapes manifested over the background. He died at the Memorial Hospital in Washington County, GA on 18 September 1988.

=== Subject and materials ===
Murray's lexicon of colors was confined to primary colors, white, and black for the majority of his career. Each color held a specific meaning. Red represented torment or evil, blue represented "good" and positive strength, and yellow and gold indicated a divine presence or energy such as God himself or the sun. White was often added among these colors to denote spiritual purity and black was seldom added to denote death or the afterlife. Murray uses color and "spirit script" in tandem to create "spirit works," what he called his paintings, which showcased the battles between good and evil that Murray saw unfolding in everyday life. His "spirit works" contained messages for visitors and viewers that Murray alone could interpret.

His colors and calligraphy were often compartmentalized into horizontal or vertical registers and square or rectangular spaces. Many historians also note horror vacui in Murray's work. His paintings deviate from the known American Folk Art repertoire in that there is very little representation or interpretation of life. There is no wildlife, Biblical characters, political or patriotic themes, and no narrative obvious to the viewer.

Nearly all of Murray's works were completed on paper, whether that be napkins, receipt paper, construction paper, or poster board, using pens, colored pencils, felt-tip markers, and acrylic paint.

=== Exhibitions and permanent collections ===
Murray's work has been shown in the following exhibitions:

- Baking in the Sun: Visionary Images from the South, 13 Jun.- 31 Jul 1987, University Art Museum, Lafayette, LA.
- Outside the Mainstream; Folk Art in Our Time. May–August 1988, High Museum of Art at Georgia Pacific Center, Atlanta, GA.
- Afro-American Folk Artists. 30 Jul.- 7 Aug. 1988, Berman Gallery, Atlanta, GA.
- Gifted Visions:Black American Folk Art, 1988, Atrium Gallery, University of Connecticut, Storrs, CT.
- American Resources: Selected Works of American American Artists. 26 Aug- 24 Sep, 1989, Bernice Steinbaum Gallery, New York, NY.
- Another Face of the Diamond: Pathways Through the Black Atlantic South. 1989, New Visions Gallery, New York, NY.
- Black History, Black Vision: The Visionary Image in Texas. 27 Jan.- 19 Mar. 1989, Archer m. Huntington Gallery, University of Texas at Austin, Austin, TX.
- A Density of Passions, Aug 1989, New Jersey State Museum, Trenton, NJ.
- Gifted Visions: African American Folk Art. 27 Jan- 24 Feb. 1990, University Art Gallery, University of Massachusetts, Dartmouth, MA.
- J.B. Murry, 15 Dec. 1990- 12 Jan, 1991, Phyllis Kind Gallery, New York.
- Parallel Visions: Modern Artists and Outsider Art. 18 Oct. 1992- 3 Jan. 1993, Los Angeles County Museum of Art (LACMA), Los Angeles, CA.
- Pictured in My Mind: Contemporary American Self-Taught Art from the collection of Dr. Kurt Gitter and Alice Rae Yelen. 1995, Birmingham Museum of Art, Birmingham, AL.
- Wrestling with History: A Celebration of African American Self-Taught Artists from the collection of Ronald and June Shelp, 1996, Baruch College, CUNY, New York, NY.
- Masterworks by Twentieth Century African-American Artists. 17 Jan- 1 Mar, 1998, Springfield Museum of Art, Springfield, OH.
- Southern Spirit: The Hill Collection. 21 Feb - 31 Mar 2000, Museum of Art, Tallahassee, FL.
- Testimony: Vernacular Art of the African American South: the Ronald and June Shelp Collection. 2001, Kalamazoo Institute of Arts, Kalamazoo, MI.
- Define Drawing: Work by Self-Taught Artists Past and Present. 14 Jul- 15 Sep 2001, Barbara Archer Gallery, Atlanta, GA.
- Stories of Community: Self-Taught Art from the Hill Collection. 12 Aug- 30 Oct, 2004. Museum of Arts and Sciences, Macon, GA.
- Coming Home: Self-Taught Artists, the Bible, and the American South. 19 Jun - 13 Nov. 2004, Art Museum of the University of Memphis, Memphis, TN.
- The Souls of Black Folk: Selections of African American Folk Art from the Museum's Permanent Collection. 28 Nov. 2004- ongoing, Museum of African American Life and Culture, Dallas, TX.
- Holy H2O: Fluid Universe. 2 Oct. 2004- 4 Sep. 2005, American Visionary Art Museum, Baltimore, MD.
- Visual Glossolalia. 15 Jun - 15 Jul, 2005, Luise Ross Gallery, New York, NY.
- Parallel Visions II. 5 Apr.- 26 May 2006, Galerie St. Etienne, New York, NY.
- Recent Acquisitions. 6 Jun.- 8 Sep., 2006, Galerie St. Etienne, New York, NY.
- Amazing Grace: Self-Taught Artists from the Mullis Collection, 29, Sep. 2007- 6 Jan. 2008, Georgia Museum of Art, University of Georgia, Athens, GA.
- Crossroads: Spirituality in American Folk Traditions. 17 Nov, 2007- 24 Feb, 2008. Owensboro Museum of Fine Art, Owensboro, KY.
- Approaching Abstraction. 6 Oct, 2009- 6 Sep, 2010, Museum of American Folk Art, New York, NY.
- All Folk, 19 Aug.- 2 Oct. 2010, Barbara Archer Gallery, Atlanta, GA.
- Naives, Seers, one Wolves, and World Savers XXIV, 2 Apr. 2011, Dean Jensen Gallery, Milwaukee, WI.
- Outsider Visions: Self-Taught Southern Artists of the Twentieth Century. 21 Sep, 2011- 8 Jan, 2012, Boca Raton Museum of Art, Boca Raton, FL.
- Pure Folk: Celebrating the Folk Art Society of America. 14 Sep.- 10 Nov. 2012, Barbara Archer Gallery, Atlanta, GA.
- Voodoo Child: J.B. Murray and Mary Smith. 2013, abcd, le galerie, Paris, FR.
- When the Stars Begin to Fall: Imagination in the American South. 27 Mar- 29 Jun, 2014, Studio Museum in Harlem, New York, NY.

Murray's works are in the permanent collections of the following museums:

- Metropolitan Museum of Art
- Minneapolis Institute of Art
- Ackland Art Museum
- Smithsonian American Art Museum
- American Folk Art Museum

== Relevant literature ==
- Judith McWillie and Grey Gundaker. No Space Hidden: The Spirit of African American Yardwork (Knoxville: University of Tennessee Press, 2005) pp. 39, 40, 168–171.
- Clifton-James, Licia E. 2016. Making the connection: JB Murray and the scripts and forms of Africa. University of Missouri-Kansas City: doctoral dissertation.
