= Charles Benefiel =

American outsider artist

Charles Benefiel (born 1967) is a contemporary American outsider artist from California. As he has severe obsessive–compulsive disorder (OCD), almost all of his work is done via stippling. He currently lives in Albuquerque, New Mexico.

== Overview ==
Born in Venice Beach, California, Benefiel experienced a mental breakdown in 1997 and was urged by friends to go to a mental health center, where he was diagnosed with obsessive–compulsive disorder. His work has since been featured in various psychiatry and art magazines. His art is generally done on a large scale, some pieces being up to 5 x 8 feet in size; he does most of his work through a neurotic method of stippling, without any preliminary designs. After the stippling is complete, the works are soaked in tea and treated with chemicals to give an old look.

== Style and method ==
He renders his work through a process of stippling done with very precise rapidograph technical pens; his pieces are done without any preliminary drawings, and with no lines to guide the composition. As Benefiel states, 'There was no need to stay in the lines, because there are no lines.' In his representational drawings, Benefiel works from the center outward, and in his drawings of rows of numbers he stipples the characters from left to right as they would appear on a typed or printed page. As he draws, he counts the dots until a certain point, then repeats the sequence. Once the dots are complete, Benefiel tones the paper with tea, to add visual depth as well as a look of age. The idea of this method is to provide an exceptional degree of incremental control where possibilities for spontaneity and error are all but erased, to aesthetically resemble photographic grain, and to serve and complement his OCD. He also produces pictures with figures reminiscent of a giant sized child's doll, often positioned in the centre of a piece and surround by numbers.

In the early 2000s, while living in New York City and New Mexico, Benefiel created the "Random Numeric Repeater" series of ink and watercolour on paper using what he described as a "dumb language", a random sequence of dots, circles, and dashes. Each symbol represents a corresponding numeral and sound that he made when creating the drawings. Later, Benefiel returned to his home state of California after residing in Philadelphia, Pennsylvania for five years where he had created and managed The Loom, a multi-use building that incorporated light manufacturing and artist's studios into a 250,000 square foot former factory.

While living in San Diego, Benefiel had two massive cardiac arrests six months apart and had extensive brain damage due to hypoxia, a lack of oxygen to the brain. Benefiel experienced extensive aphasia, the loss of his short and long-term memory, and the skills of visualization and hand eye coordination required for his drawing technique. Due to these disabilities, Benefiel required a long program of rehabilitation to recover many of these cognitive skills that were impacted by these events. He also began practicing Vipassana meditation to help rebuild the neural pathways that were harmed by the hypoxia.

He now lives in Albuquerque, New Mexico, where he is beginning to explore incorporating art back into his life as a form of spiritual healing.
