= Grace Bashara Greene =

- Born: 1928; Houston, USA
- Died: 2004 (aged 75–76)
- Known for: Assemblage; Visionary environment
- Movement: Outsider art

Grace Bashara Greene (1928 – 2004) was an American visionary artist noted for her assemblage work and for the visionary environment she created in her house, which was featured in the documentary film Eyeopeners.

== Work ==
Greene collected items that eventually filled her house completely, eventually becoming an installation that was first put on display in 1993.

== Collections and exhibits ==
Grace Bashara Greene's piece The Button Lady and a shawl, originally made for her daughter Lizzie, hand-sewn from hundreds of pieces of antique lace and further decorated with beads, ribbons and other trinkets, are held by the American Visionary Art Museum in Baltimore, Maryland. These works were featured in the 2005 AVAM exhibit IOCD: Obsessive-Compulsive Delight.
