= Vestie Davis =

American painter

Vestie Davis (1903 – November 14, 1978) was a self-taught American artist whose works are in many important collections, including those of the American Folk Art Museum, the Smithsonian American Art Museum, and the Milwaukee Art Museum. His work was the subject of a monographic exhibition, Vestie Davis's New York, at the American Folk Art Museum, which ran for over a year beginning in autumn 2009.

== Life and work ==
Born in Baltimore, Davis moved to New York City at the age of twenty-five in 1928, where he worked as a "circus barker, undertaker, newsstand operator, and church organist." He lived in Bensonhurst. In 1947 he began painting, after a conversion experience looking in a gallery window on 57th Street. Davis explained: "One day in 1947 I was walking on 57th Street and came to a big gallery. I looked in, saw some pictures I liked, said to myself, 'I can paint like that.' So I walked into an artist's material store."

Davis focused his art on New York City landmarks, which he depicted in a bright, broadly graphic style, densely peopled by cartoonish silhouettes. As the artist explained, "The more people I put in, the faster they (i.e. the pictures) sold." Yet these multitudes are uniformly white, which has led Davis to be criticized for the unrealistic homogeneity of his art. A favorite subject was Nathan's hotdog stand in Coney Island, which Davis frequently painted, once with three hundred figures.

Davis was represented by the Morris Gallery in Greenwich Village, after Morris Weisenthal was impressed by his work at a show on Washington Square in the 1950s. His work sold well, appealing to the public with its accessible subject matter and style (quite unlike esoteric Modernism). As Davis readily admitted, "I paint what people want, and they want what is familiar to them." Fittingly, the painter of crowds was a crowd-pleaser.

Davis died of cancer in New York City at the age of 75 in 1978. At the time of his death he was a celebrated figure, with his work included in Bicentennial celebrations two years earlier. He is buried in Green-Wood Cemetery, Brooklyn.

== Bibliography ==
- Miller, Gloria Bley. "Vestie Davis, Brooklyn Painter, in his own Words: Interviews from 1961 to 1965," in Folk Art, Summer 2003, pp. 40–51.
