= Vernon Burwell =

African-American sculptor

Vernon Burwell (1916–1990) was an African-American sculptor known for his painted cement sculptures of animals and busts of historical figures such as Abraham Lincoln, Sojourner Truth, and Martin Luther King Jr.

== Life and career ==
Burwell was born on April 28, 1916, in North Carolina into a sharecropping family. His parents died when he was thirteen and he was subsequently cared for by seven other farming families. At age sixteen, he joined the Missionary Baptist church, where he later became a deacon. At age 26, in 1942, he married and began working for the Atlantic Coast Line Railroad. He was promoted to master mechanic and repaired diesel locomotives for the rest of his career. He and his wife raised five children, three girls and two sons, together in Rocky Mount.

After 33 years of service to the railroad industry, Burwell retired in 1975 on disability due to diabetes-related eyesight deterioration. He began making cement sculptures within a year of retirement. When he first began sculpting, he painted his sculptures in vivid, life-like renderings using automobile paint. As his eye-sight worsened, he covered his sculptures in monochrome gold spray paint. A cataracts surgery eventually restored his vision. He worked out of his garage in the Black Bottom neighborhood of Rocky Mount, North Carolina.

Burwell's daughter fell ill in 1987 and died shortly thereafter. Burwell was so grief-stricken that, during the last two years of his life, he ceased making work entirely.

=== Sources of inspiration ===
Burwell's muses came from his immediate surroundings, the novel accomplishments of African-Americans in the 20th century, and imaginary animals. He stated some sources of inspiration as "different people-- friends, biblical characters, and people I sees in the daily papers."

=== Materials and techniques ===
Burwell began by constructing a skeleton for his sculptures made of found metal objects such as steel rods, pipes, and clothes hangers. He would then apply concrete (a mix of lime, gravel, sand, cement, and water) to the armature, sculpting the figure as he went along. Burwell rarely smoothed the surfaces of his sculptures. Instead he left them rough and painted over them to give added surface texture. Although most of his work is smaller than three feet tall, he recorded making one or two life-size sculptures. Burwell estimated making about 200 objects during his career.

== Exhibitions ==
Burwell's work has been featured in the following exhibitions:

- Here and There: Travels, Part 1: Outside Insight. 27 October – 11 December 1988, MoMA PS1, New York City, New York.
- Signs and Wonders: Outsider Art Inside North Carolina. 1989, North Carolina Museum of Art, Raleigh, NC.
- Spirits: Selections from the Collection of Geoffrey Holder and Carmen De Lavallade, 24 February – 5 May 1991, Katonah Museum of Art, Katonah, NY.
- African- American Folk Art: From the Collection of Dr. A. Everett James, 18 October – 31 December 1991, Van Vechten Gallery, Fisk University, Nashville, TN.
- Black History and Artistry: Work by Self-Taught Painters and Sculptors from the Blanchard-Hill Collection. 5 February – 4 March 1993, Sidney Mishkin Gallery, Baruch College, New York City, New York.
- Passionate Visions of the American South: Self-Taught Artists, 1940 to the Present. 23 October – 30 January 1994, New Orleans Museum of Art, New Orleans, LA.
- Outsider Art: An Exploration of Chicago Collections. 9 December 1996 – 23 February 1997, Chicago Cultural Center, Chicago, IL.
- Golden Blessings of Old Age and Out of the Mouths of Babes. 10 October 2003 – 4 September 2004, American Visionary Art Museum, Baltimore, MD.
- Homegrown and Handmade II: The Natural World - Selected Works from the Huffman Collection of Southern Contemporary Folk and Outsider Art, 18 March – 1 October 2006, Hickory Museum of Art, Hickory, NC.
- Ascension II: A Legacy of Self-Taught African American Artists of North Carolina, 12 January – 22 March 2008, Diggs Gallery, Winston-Salem State University.
- American Story. 21 June – 30 December 2009, John Michael Kohler Arts Center, Sheboygan, WI.
- Way out There: The Art of Southern Backroads. 2 March – 19 May 2019, High Museum of Art, Atlanta, GA.

== Permanent collections ==
Burwell's works are in the permanent collections of the following museums:

- St. James Place Folk Art Museum
- Gregg Museum of Art and Design
- High Museum of Art
- John Michael Kohler Arts Center
- Milwaukee Art Museum
