= Gobrien de Vannes =

Saint Gobrien de Vannes was a Breton churchman, nineteenth Bishop of Vannes, in the eighth century. His feast is 10 November.

== Biography ==
Gobrien was born around 660. Guy Alexis Lobineau maintains that Gobrien was born in the region of Vannes and trained in religious life in the monastery of Saint-Gildas de Rhuys abbey. Gobrien returned to Vannes, where he was ordained priest and on the death of the bishop, he was elected to succeed.

The standard clichés are told of him. He led a virtuous life, and was heedful of the poor and sick, all while attending to his pastoral duties and his own spiritual life. After seventeen years as bishop, he retired to a hermitage near Josselin, where his body was deposited in the chapel of Saint-Gobrien of Saint-Servant in 735.

According to legend it was necessary to deposit a handful of nails on the tomb, in the chapel and when the nail is rusted, the patient is cured.

== Bibliography ==
- Liste chronologique des évêques de Vannes, diocèse de Vannes.
- Éloge et pratique des saints guérisseurs, Michèle Brocard
