= Hospitality House =

US nonprofit organization

Coordinates: 37.78303°N 122.41378°W

Hospitality House (a.k.a. Central City Hospitality House) is a house of hospitality-type center that serves the homeless and poor of San Francisco, specifically those of the Tenderloin district of the city, where it is located. At a drop-in day center it provides counseling, instruction, computer access, medical triage, and other forms of assistance. It also runs a 30-bed shelter, two Employment Resource Centers, and a fine arts studio. Its main office is located at 290 Turk Street. It has been in operation since 1967.

Hospitality House is known for encouraging the homeless and poor to take part in art and creative writing. It has published the work of many artists and writers, and holds periodic exhibitions where the artists can sell their work. Hospitality House operates the Community Art Studio, a storefront art gallery and studio, which has been offering free working space and art supplies to all comers since 1969.

Hospitality House is a beneficiary of numerous fund raising events such as the Up Your Alley Fest. In 2014 the facility attracted international news coverage when a 53-year-old homeless man competed in the San Francisco Marathon to raise funds for Hospitality House. He also raffled off one of his paintings to benefit the charity. He wound up running a half-marathon and raised nearly $10,000 for Hospitality House.

Outsider artist Jane Winkelman was originally introduced to painting at Hospitality House.
