= Juanita Rogers =

American sculptor

- Born: May 12, 1934; Tintop, Alabama
- Died: January 26, 1985 (aged 50); Montgomery, Alabama
- Movement: Folk art

Juanita Rogers (May 12, 1934, in Tintop, Alabama - January 26, 1985) was a self-taught American folk artist. She was born in Tintop, Alabama to Thomas and Sally Rogers, although she claimed she was adopted after arriving in North Montgomery by carnival train at the age of five. Her mother was part Creek Indian, and died when Juanita was about twenty. Juanita attended a Catholic mission school. She was married to Sol Huffman, who died in 1980.

Rogers claimed her neighbor, famed Montgomery blues singer Clarence Carter, taught her to "make mud" at the age of five. She is known for her clay sculptures of human, animal, and vessel forms, and uses mud, bones, and shells in her art. She made watercolor paintings. She is also known for pencil and tempera drawings, whose style has been compared to Hogarth by the New York Times. Her works draw from Native American and traditional African American cultures.

Some of her work was based on television images, such as the Coneheads characters of Saturday Night Live. By one estimate she created 300 works.

Her works have been displayed at London's Outsider Archives, the Art Brut Museum, in Lausanne, Switzerland, at the University of Mississippi, and at the Smithsonian Art Museum Renwick Gallery.
