= Jane Winkelman =

American painter (1949–2012)

- Born: March 31, 1949; Long Island, New York, U.S.
- Died: May 30, 2012 (aged 63)
- Known for: Painting
- Movement: Outsider Art

Jane Winkelman (1949 – May 30, 2012) was an American painter. Her paintings are often signed "Jane 'in vain' Winkelman." She is considered an outsider artist.

== Life ==
Jane Winkelman was born in 1949 in Long Island, New York. She lived for a time in Miami as well as San Francisco. While in San Francisco, she lived on the edge of homelessness in the Tenderloin district.

== Work ==
Winkelman was introduced to painting at San Francisco's Hospitality House, a free community arts center. Her work is characterized by vivid colors, fantastic figures, and strong political commentary. They often include text as well as images. Her style has been compared to that of Hieronymous Bosch, Marc Chagall, and Edvard Munch.

== Recognition ==
In 1993, after her work had gained some attention at group shows and on the cover of the Street Sheet, she was commissioned to produce an Absolut Vodka ad. She published art in Street Sheet from 1990 through 2009. In February 2009, she was the San Francisco Bay Guardian "Local Artist of the Week". Her work was also supported by POOR Magazine.

== Collections and exhibitions ==
Her painting "Dreamscape" (1985) is in the collection of the Smithsonian American Art Museum. Winkelman's work is also featured in the permanent collection of the Pérez Art Museum Miami, and was on view at PAMM in the group show What Carried Us Over: Gifts from the Gordon W. Bailey Collection, from 2019 to 2020.
