= Brooks Yeomans =

American artist

Brooks Yeomans (born 1957) is an American artist often classified as an outsider artist.

His work is included in the collection of the Lille Métropole Museum of Modern, Contemporary and Outsider Art, the Hickory Museum of Art, and the Tate Gallery, London.
