= Alyne Harris =

African American painter (1942–2025)

Alyne Harris (March 1942 – August 12, 2025) was an African American painter from Gainesville, Florida. She was an artist who draws inspiration from her surroundings and religion.

== Early life ==
Alyne Harris was born on March 25, 1942 in Gainesville, Florida. She grew up on a farm with seven siblings. As a child, Harris and her sisters played at the Pleasant Grove Cemetery, and she remembers first learning to draw in the dirt there. When she had free time in school, she drew and painted instead of playing. She was inspired by nature and by visions she saw of angels.

== Personal life ==
Harris had two children and worked many jobs throughout her life, including at the University of Florida Cafeteria, laundry cleaners, janitorial services, and senior care. She took night classes at Santa Fe College in her thirties. She belonged to the Williams Temple Sanctified Church of God in Christ in Gainesville, Florida and used her faith to inspire her work. In her free time, Alyne taught children how to paint.

== Career ==
Harris's career as an artist started to gain traction in the southern art community in the 1990s. She drew inspiration from African American traditions, her religion, and nature. Many of her pieces depict angels, churches, or flowers. Harris often paints at night while listening to music. She uses acrylic paints for the vibrant colors. Harris finds painting therapeutic and she always knows what she is going to paint before she starts.

Harris's art is held in many private collections and is often displayed at exhibitions in museums and local art festivals. In 2020, The Historic Thomas Center bought 400 of her pieces from private collector. Her artwork is housed in several collections, including House of Blues, Folk Art Museum of Central Texas, Folk Art Museum of New York City, the Rockford Art Museum, the Asheville Art Museum, Souls Grown Deep, and the New Orleans Museum of Art. Alyne's artwork can be purchased through multiple online galleries, including Jeanine Taylor Folk Art and Main Street Gallery.

Harris died on August 12, 2025, in Gainesville, Florida.
