= Pierre Vuitton =

French painter

Pierre Vuitton (1880, Verdun - 1962, Paris) was a French art brut painter.

== Biography ==
After being severely wounded, both physically and psychologically, in WW1, Pierre Vuitton abandoned his previous life as the child of wealthy merchants. After several stays in sanitariums and mental hospitals, he moved to Paris in 1920. As an enjoyer of morphine and alcohol, he lived as a casual laborer in poverty despite the occasional sale of his pictures. His first works were probably created during the war years, later he developed "time-excesses" in which he reportedly spent several days painting without eating or sleeping. He made the acquaintance of several artists in the Parisian bohemian scene, including Jean Dubuffet, Cocteau, Picasso, de Chirico, and Picabia. Increasingly, however, his deteriorating mental condition spoiled any binding relationship, so he spent most of his later life in mental hospitals or in nursing homes.

Many works by Vuitton are stylistically likened to the images of Louis Soutter, who was also tormented by an inner turmoil. Typical of Vuitton's expressive painting is the use of newspaper paper or book pages as the canvas. Vuitton is a classic representative of the art brut or outsider art as defined by Jean Dubuffet.
