= Ossie Lee Samuels =

American artist (1931–2017)

- Born: November 18, 1931; Wilcox County, Georgia, USA
- Died: July 6, 2017 (aged 85); Tallahassee, Florida
- Known for: wood carving

Ossie Lee Samuels (1931 – 2017) was an American artist known for his wood carving.

Samuels was born on November 18, 1931, in Wilcox County, Georgia. He worked as a tree surgeon until he was disabled due to a fall from a tree. At this time he began carving figures from wood, often incorporating the shape of the original piece of wood. In the 1990s Robinson moved to Tallahassee, Florida. He died there on July 6, 2017.

Samuels work is the collections of American Visionary Art Museum, and the Smithsonian American Art Museum.
