= John Urho Kemp =

Outsider artist (1942–2010)

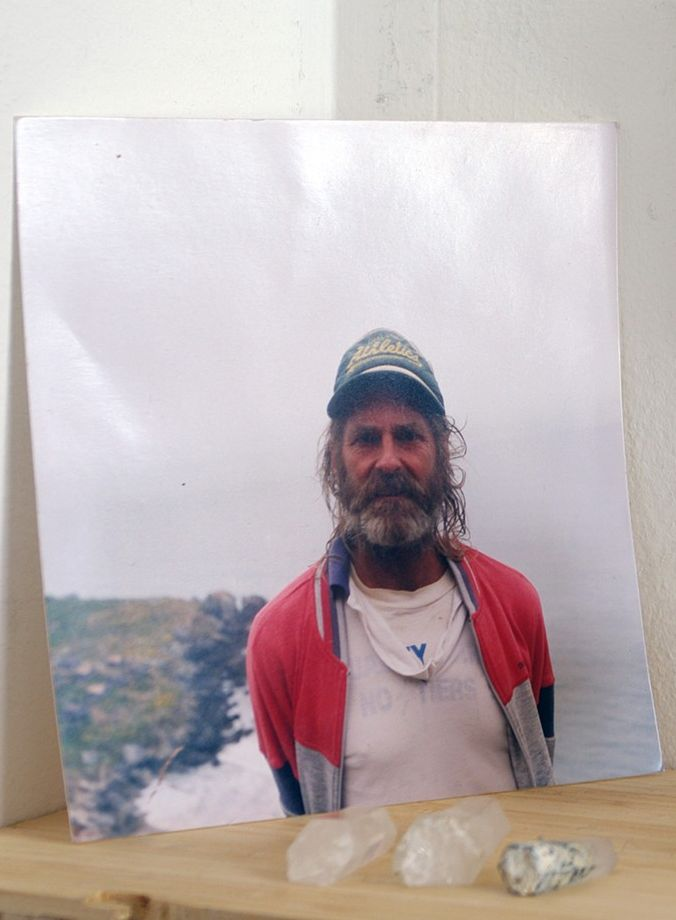
- A portrait photo of John Urho Kemp presented at an exhibit at San Francisco Art Institute
- Born: 18 June 1942; San Francisco, California, US
- Died: 31 January 2010 (aged 67); Oakland, California, US
- Resting place: Ashes scattered in the Pacific
- Education: U.C. Berkeley
- Known for: Drawing
- Movement: abstract art

John Urho Kemp (June 18, 1942 California, United States – January 31, 2010) also known as "Crystal John" or "Cosmic John", was an American outsider artist, "a metaphysical researcher", and a vegan. His main artistic output consisted of "offerings", photocopied leaflets presenting formulas, drawings, mandalas, magic cubes and verses based on Kemp's ideas of godhood, spirituality and metaphysics. He distributed these leaflets to everyone interested. In addition to the leaflets, he also produced similarly themed original pieces of art for his personal use. Kemp began producing these works probably in the late 1970s. During his lifetime he did not receive much recognition as an artist; however, in the years following his death there has been renewed interest in his work. His works are circulated mostly in Art Brut circles.

== Life ==
Not much is known about John Urho Kemp's life, and the majority of the biographical information extant is sourced from a résumé found posthumously at his estate. John Kemp was born on June 18, 1942 in California to a civil engineer Urho Kemp and a housewife Roberta Kemp. He was their only child. His father, Urho, was raised in a Finnish immigrant community and his mother, Roberta, came from a long line of California settlers. According to his resume, John Urho was a mathematically gifted student, graduating in 1959 from Berkeley High School as one of the honor students in calculus. After graduation, he enrolled at the University of Berkeley in California. In 1965, he obtained a bachelor's degree in chemical and biochemical engineering. Kemp worked as a chemical engineer for almost two years for Union Oil Company's Rodeo refinery. He resigned from his position to study Scientology in England and Los Angeles until 1971, graduating from a Clearing course in 1969. After his money was used on Scientological fees, he became an ex-member. Between 1972 and 1980, Kemp ran an antique store in Los Angeles.

He was interested in metaphysical philosophy all of his life, studying new age and esoteric philosophies. Kemp attended Manly P. Hall lectures at the Philosophical Research Society during the early 1980s and traveled around the world to witness solar eclipses. He was also interested in the properties of healing crystals and was a frequent patron at the Marin hot springs in Northern California, During his lifetime, Kemp was also a member of Institute of Divine Metaphysical Research.

Kemp died on January 31, 2010. While his apartment was being cleaned after his death, a trove of his works were discovered there. San Francisco based artist Aram Muksian saved these materials and created an online archive which has sparked newfound interest in John Urho Kemp's work.

== Career ==
=== Process and materials ===
The earliest dated works of John Urho Kemp are from the late 1970s. He was most likely a self-taught outsider artist who communicated his ideas about metaphysics, health, meditation, and other topics, such as life, love and divinity throughout his artistic works. His works include mathematical formulas, geometrical objects and gematric calculations closely related to Kabbalah. Most of his pieces were created using pen or pencil on blank scrap paper. However, some of his works were fashioned as magic cubes constructed out of paper and folded to form three dimensional structures. The works were often meticulously drawn and lettered, then copied en masse and distributed to people he encountered. Kemp used to leave copies of his works on random car windshields, and was known to distribute them to anyone he met who was interested.

== Exhibitions ==
- La Beauté du Diable, Frac Franche-Comté - Cité des Arts. From October 15, 2022 to March 12, 2023.
- Power(less) DOX centre d'art contemporain, Prague, Czech From June 3 to November 6, 2022.
- do the write thing: read between the lines #3. From April 2 to May 22, 2022.
- Eureka! Centro de arte Oliva, Portugal. From July 23, 2021 to August 27, 2022.
- L’homme gris Casino Luxembourg. From November 14, 2020 to June 6, 2021.
- Ojo electrico Casa Encendida, Madrid, Spain. September 24, 2019.
- beyond on the edge of the visible and the invisible. From March 7 to April 13, 2019.
- do the write thing 2 read between the lines. From April 26 to June 2, 2018.
- drawing now 2018 Carreau du Temple. From March 22 to 25, 2018.
- The Museum of everything Museum of Old and New Art, Tasmania. From June 17, 2017 to April 2, 2018.
- in abstracto. From June 8 to July 15, 2017.
- Art Brut A Story of Individual Mythologies, Treger Saint Silvestre Collection, Portugal. From January 1 to February 26, 2017.
- Brut Now art brut in the technological era, Belfort Museums. From October 29, 2016 to January 16, 2017.
- Cracking The Code. Appleton Square, Lisbonne. From October 7 to November 3, 2016.
- YIA art fair, Espace Louise 186, Bruxelles. From April 21 to 24, 2016.
- On The Wire by Jean-Hubert Martin. From April 9 to May 22, 2016.
- PreTENse. Berst Gallery. From September 12 to October 10, 2015.
- John Urho Kemp a Bermuda Triangle. Berst Gallery. From May 30 to July 18, 2015.
- CHOICES 2015, Palais des Beaux Arts, Paris, France. From May 29 to 31, 2015.
- Division Leap. Portland Museum of Modern Art. Portland, Oregon, USA
- Outsider Art Fair in New York City 2014 and 2015

== Collections ==
- Musée national d’art moderne (Pompidou)
- Antoine Frérot collection, France
- Treger Saint Silvestre collection, Portugal
- Arthur Borgnis
