= Maximum entropy =

Maximum entropy may refer to:

- Entropy, a scientific concept as well as a measurable physical property that is most commonly associated with a state of disorder, randomness, or uncertainty.

== Physics ==
- Maximum entropy thermodynamics
- Maximum entropy spectral estimation

== Mathematics and statistics ==
- Principle of maximum entropy
- Maximum entropy probability distribution
- Maximum entropy classifier, in regression analysis

== See also ==
- Second law of thermodynamics, establishes the concept of entropy as a physical property of a thermodynamic system
