= Richard Burnside =

American painter

Richard Burnside (1944 - 2020) was an American self-taught folk art painter known for his distinct portraiture style and use of patterns. He had lived in Pendleton, South Carolina., but spent the last few years of his life in Georgia.

== Life ==
Burnside was born on November 29, 1944, in Baltimore, Maryland, but moved to South Carolina when he was five years old. He attended Sterling high School in Greenville, South Carolina. He held many jobs throughout his life including seven years working at the S&H Green Stamp store in Greenville, a seven-year stint in the U.S. military, and later as a hotel chef in Charlotte, North Carolina. He married twice, first in 1966 to Maggie Holiday (divorced in 1969) and second to Mary Givens in 1974 (divorced 1976). He had two daughters by Holiday and one son and one daughter by Givens. He died in Georgia on October 13, 2020, at the age of 75.

== Art career ==
Although Burnside held many jobs throughout his life, painting remained his most consistent focus. Some art historians and curators believe that Burnside's subjects are "an Africanized mythology from biblical stories, folktales, and even nursery rhymes".

"He finds motifs of his paintings in other artworks and in every-day objects, from Army insignia to beer mugs and telephone poles, and has invented personal symbols that he terms his 'Roman Alphabet.' These symbols including spiders, snakes and other creatures most often surround his depictions of flat, round, mask-like faces, which he has seen in dreams and 'coming out of the walls.' He titles his frontal, staring figures kings, queens, and priests.'"

=== Materials and Techniques ===
Burnside was known to paint on found material such as gourds, cardboard, sticks and scraps of metal, but his most common surface was thin plywood. He used enamel as a primary layer, drew his composition with a felt tip pen, and then filled in the drawing with colorful paint. He then left the completed painting on a table outside for about a day to allow the piece to weather. The typical size of Burnside's pieces were 30" x 30" or smaller.

== Collections ==
Burnside's work is in the permanent collections of the Minneapolis Institute of Art, the Smithsonian American Art Museum, the Milwaukee Art Museum, and the Ackland Art Museum. He had a retrospective show at the McKissick Museum in Columbia, South Carolina in 2016.
