= Shafique Uddin =

Bangladeshi-British artist

Shafique Uddin (born 1962) is a Bangladeshi-born British outsider artist known for his paintings. Uddin was born in Borobari, Bangladesh (then East Pakistan), and moved to the United Kingdom in 1976.

Shafique's first exhibition, at the age of seventeen, was at London's Whitechapel Gallery. He was a part of the 2005 Outsider Art exhibition held by the Tate Museum, London. In 2016 he was a part of the Whitechapel Gallery exhibition Inner Worlds Outside.

His work is included in the Arts Council Collection of Southbank Centre, London, the Bradford Museums and Galleries, the New Art Gallery Walsall, the Irish Museum of Modern Art's Outsider Art Collection and the Anthony Petullo Collection of Self-taught & Outsider Art at the Milwaukee Art Museum.

== Solo exhibitions ==
- 1988 Shafique Uddin, Horizon Gallery, London, UK
- 1991 Shafique Uddin: Recent Paintings, Terrace London, UK

== Group exhibitions ==
- 1986 Brushes with the West, Wapping Sports Centre, London, UK
- 1986 From Two Worlds, Whitechapel Art Gallery, London, UK
- 1987 In Another World: Outsider Art from Europe & America, Ferens Art Gallery, Hull, UK
- 1988 Numaish Lalit Kala: Indian Arts Festival, Bluecoat Gallery Liverpool, UK
- 1990 The British Art Show, McLellan Galleries, Glasgow & Hayward Gallery, London, UK
- 1990 In Focus, Horizon Gallery, London, UK
