= Jesse Howard =

American artist (1885–1983)

Jesse Clyde Howard (1885–1983) was an American artist known for his hand-lettered signs.

== Biography ==
Howard was born on June 4, 1885, in Shamrock, Missouri. A self-taught artist, Howard's first professional recognition came when Art in America profiled him in 1968. Howard worked from what he called "Sorehead Hill", a 20-acre farm in Fulton, Missouri, where he both produced and displayed his work.

He died November 21, 1983 in Fulton. His work is included in the collection of the Smithsonian American Art Museum, the American Folk Art Museum and the Metropolitan Museum of Art.
