= Mary L. Proctor =

American artist (born 1960)

- Born: Mary Cooksey; 1960 (age 65–66); Lloyd, Florida, USA
- Movement: American Contemporary Art

"Missionary" Mary L. Proctor (born 1960) is an American artist, best known for her visionary paintings, collages, and assemblages.

== Early life ==
Mary Proctor (née Cooksey) was born in 1960 to Pauline Cooksey in Lloyd, Florida. Her 11-year-old mother was unable to care for her, so she was raised by her grandparents. Her grandmother was an African-American homemaker and her grandfather a white farmer. Proctor attended public school until becoming pregnant in ninth grade. She then took on the responsibility of raising her younger siblings.

=== Marriage ===
After the death of her grandfather, and her grandmother's struggle with alcoholism, Mary met and married Tyrone Proctor. Together they moved to Tallahassee, Florida.

=== Early career ===
After working in the nursing field for ten years, Proctor opened Tender Loving Care Day Care Center and was the proprietor for five years. In search of 'something easier' Proctor began collecting items from the roadside to sell at the local flea market. Eventually, she opened her own store, "Noah's Ark Flea Market." Collecting remains her hobby.

=== Career as an artist ===
In 1994, a house fire claimed the lives of Proctor's grandmother, aunt and uncle. Proctor claims to have had a vision immediately before the fire occurred in which she "...saw light going all the way up to heaven." Following the fire in 1995, Proctor claims she had a vision during prayer that told her to "Paint". These visions inspired her to begin her pursuit as an artist. Her first pieces were portraits, painted on doors, of her family members who died in the fire. She set them in her front yard where they caught the attention of curator and critic Tricia Collins, who purchased them for her gallery in New York.

Her pieces typically consist of button, fake-jewel and glass encrusted figures upon a canvas of windows or doors. Her works often include spiritual messages and observances.

She signs most pieces with the name "Missionary Mary L Proctor," a name she uses to represent her religious motivation. "The Lord spoke, and he said, "You are on a mission to get a great message out into the houses and hearts." That's why the "missionary" name came to me, because of my mission. I'm going to get a message out to broken womens [sic], a message to help and glorify them. I'm going to get a message out so men can search their hearts, learn to respect us and treat us the right way."

"Missionary" Mary started her art studio in her roadside junk shop in south Leon County, Florida, in 1995. In 2011, Proctor opened the American Folk Art Museum and Gallery in Tallahassee, Florida. The American Folk Art Museum and Gallery was located in the Tallahassee Mall.

She had her first one-woman show at All Saints Gallery in Tallahassee, Florida, in 1995, and a year later, a one-woman show of her doors at the Tricia Collins Grand Salon in New York. She was selected for inclusion in three museum exhibitions in 1997: Schomburg Center for Research in Black Culture of the New York Public Library, New York; Zora Neale Hurston Museum of Fine Arts, Eatonville, Florida; Museum of African American Art, Tampa, Florida. The same year, she was featured in a one-woman show, "Mary Proctor: Contemporary American Folk Artist" at Florida A&M University, Tallahassee. She has been a regular exhibitor at the Kentuck Arts Festival for over twenty years.

The cover story of Raw Vision magazine (Vol. 29 Winter 1999–2000) was "Mary Proctor's Vision." She has since been the subject of at least twelve one-woman museum exhibitions. Her work has been included in more than forty group shows, including: American Visionary Art Museum, Baltimore, Maryland, and Smithsonian Institution Anacostia Museum and Center for African American History and Culture, Washington DC. Additional, notable exhibitions include the 2016 Atlanta Biennial at the Atlanta Contemporary and the show "History Refused to Die: Highlights from the Souls Grown Deep Foundation Gift" at the Metropolitan Museum of Art in 2018.

In 2016, Proctor won a Folk Art Society Award of Distinction given by the Folk Art Society of America.

Museums holding her work in their permanent collections include: The American Visionary Art Museum, Baltimore, Maryland (16 works); Asheville Art Museum, Asheville, North Carolina; Gadsden Arts Center & Museum, Quincy, Florida;High Museum of Art, Atlanta, Georgia; Mennello Museum of American Art, Orlando, Florida; Polk Museum of Art, Lakeland, Florida; Museum of Fine Arts, St. Petersburg, Florida; Morris Museum of Art, Augusta Georgia; Smithsonian Institution Anacostia Museum, Metropolitan Museum of Art, New York, New York; New Orleans Museum of Art, New Orleans, Louisiana; Center for African American History and Culture, Washington, DC; California African American Museum, Los Angeles, California;
