= Abraham Lincoln Walker =

African-American artist

- Born: Abraham Lincoln Walker; 1921; Henderson, Kentucky
- Died: 1993 (aged 71–72)
- Known for: Painting
- Movement: Folk Art, Black Abstractionism
- Spouse: Dorothy Walker
- Children: 2

Abraham Lincoln Walker (1921-1993) was an African American artist from East St. Louis, Illinois. Self-taught, he produced over 800 paintings in his lifetime that remained mostly obscure to the art world until they were discovered in 2024, stored inside a tractor trailer on his property and subsequently heralded by art critics, purchased by prominent art collectors, and shown in solo exhibits in New York City art galleries.

== Early life ==
Abraham Lincoln Walker was born in 1921 in Henderson, Kentucky. As a youth he moved to East St. Louis, Illinois to live with his aunt and uncle.

== Career ==
Walker owned a house painting business, Lincoln Walker Painting and Decorating Company. He became interested in making art in the 1960s. He enjoyed it so much he would paint in the morning before work, after work, and on the weekends, while listening to 8-track tapes of Miles Davis, a contemporary of his who was raised within walking distance from Walker's home. He painted scenes that became increasingly abstract and psychedelic. He used unusual items to apply the paint such as putty knives, various brushes, newspaper, plastic wrappers. His work would look abstract from a distance but as you got closer things would emerge such as faces and figures. He used the "frottage" technique.

Walker reportedly experienced spiritual encounters that would rouse him from sleep, compelling him to paint. He deliberately avoided art instruction books and formal classes, believing that such training might compromise the purity of his artistic vision. Walker's son mentioned that his father would fast periodically, which led to visions.

His paintings had some exhibitions in the past. In 1974 in Seattle, where they were critiqued by Jacob Lawrence, an important African-American painter. At a street fair and at a local gallery in the mid-1970s. In 1995, a posthumous retrospective at Southern Illinois University Edwardsville. A 2013 show in St. Louis.

His adopted son, Link, inherited his father's work when his mother died in 2013. Storing the works in a tractor trailer on his property, he didn't do much with them until he almost died during the Covid epidemic. Seeking an appraisal, he found a leading art dealer in St. Louis willing to come out and look, and the dealer immediately recognized it as a major collection and sought wider recognition.

== Personal ==
Walker was married to Dorothy Walker, a social worker, and the couple had two children, at least one of whom, Link, was adopted and white.
