= Eldren Bailey =

American sculptor

Eldren M. Bailey
- Bailey with his sculptures in Atlanta, Georgia, 1986
- Born: 1903; Flovilla, Georgia, U.S.
- Died: 1987 (aged 83–84); Atlanta, Georgia, U.S.
- Known for: Sculpture
- Movement: Modern Art

Eldren "E. M." Bailey (1903–1987) was an African American artist best known for his large cement sculptures, which he often displayed in his front yard. Born in Flovilla, Georgia, Bailey spent most of his life and career in Atlanta, Georgia.

== Life ==
Born the son of a railroad worker, Bailey left school in the third grade and moved to Atlanta, Georgia from Flovilla, Georgia at the age of thirteen. Like his father, he worked on the railroads until 1942. He married his wife Marjorie in the early 1940s and left the instability of the railroad to become a cement mason in 1942. Specifically, he worked with cemeteries and funeral homes making cement grave markers and grave-digging. Bailey made his first yard sculpture (Crucifixion) in 1945 and continued to fill his yard thereafter with monuments to political figures, celebrities, and artistic figures.

Bailey died in Atlanta in 1987 at age 83.

== Career ==
Settling into a stable life as a cement mason allowed Bailey to build a studio in his home in the Mechanicsville neighborhood of Southside Atlanta. Often, Bailey's more public sculptures, which he displayed in his yard, were either recreations of historical figures, animals, or inanimate objects, such as giant urns. These sculptures were painted in vivid color during the 1940s and 1950s, but faded over time until bleach-white cement was left. Bailey's small outdoor sculpture Dancers inspired the poem "Dreaming We're E.M. Bailey's Dancers" by Carrie Meadows.

Bailey's more personal work, including small sculptures and paintings, were made inside his home out of the public eye. He made shrines to dead friends (e.g. Pyramid), carved and painted mythological trickster figures with Masonic symbolism (Spider), and created work with overt political opinions (e.g. Ecumenical, and Politician's Funeral).

His work has been shows at The Rockford Art Museum in Rockford, IL and in the exhibition ASHE: Improvisation & Recycling in African-American Visionary Art, which showed at the NC Diggs Gallery.

However, Bailey's constructions were not contained to sculptures and paintings alone. He also covered the interior of his home "in modeled concrete that resembled walls of a grotto. This "decor" conversed with Bailey's sense of the early Christian habitations of the catacombs of Rome (two plaster fish were sculpted into his laundry room's ceiling) and his interest in the legacies of those lost civilizations known only through their tombs or caves. Many of the utilitarian furnishings inside his home continued this theme. Lamps and planters assumed the forms of rock outcroppings, as if to emphasize Bailey's idea that the earth, repository of all things past, provides the assistance necessary for human life." Whether placed inside or outside of his home, some scholars proposed that Bailey's work was a consolidation of the past, which is "inhabited by beings now approachable only in memory and spirit [and] a future shaped by hope that the living and dead will meet again on the other side of the river..." The scholar and author Grey Gundaker argues that Bailey epitomizes this notion with a cast concrete polyptych, formerly embedded in his yard, of the suits in a deck of cards, wherein the diamond concrete cast held an inscription that read, "Remember to Die."

After his death in 1987, Bailey's sculptures were removed from the property. Although Bailey's smaller outdoor sculptures, such as Dancers and Moon Lady, have been preserved, his largest yard works have not been seen since.

Some of his work is now in the permanent collections of the Minneapolis Institute of Art and the High Museum of Art.
