= Maxent, Ille-et-Vilaine =

Maxent Maczant (Gallo) Skirioù-Masen (Breton)
- Commune
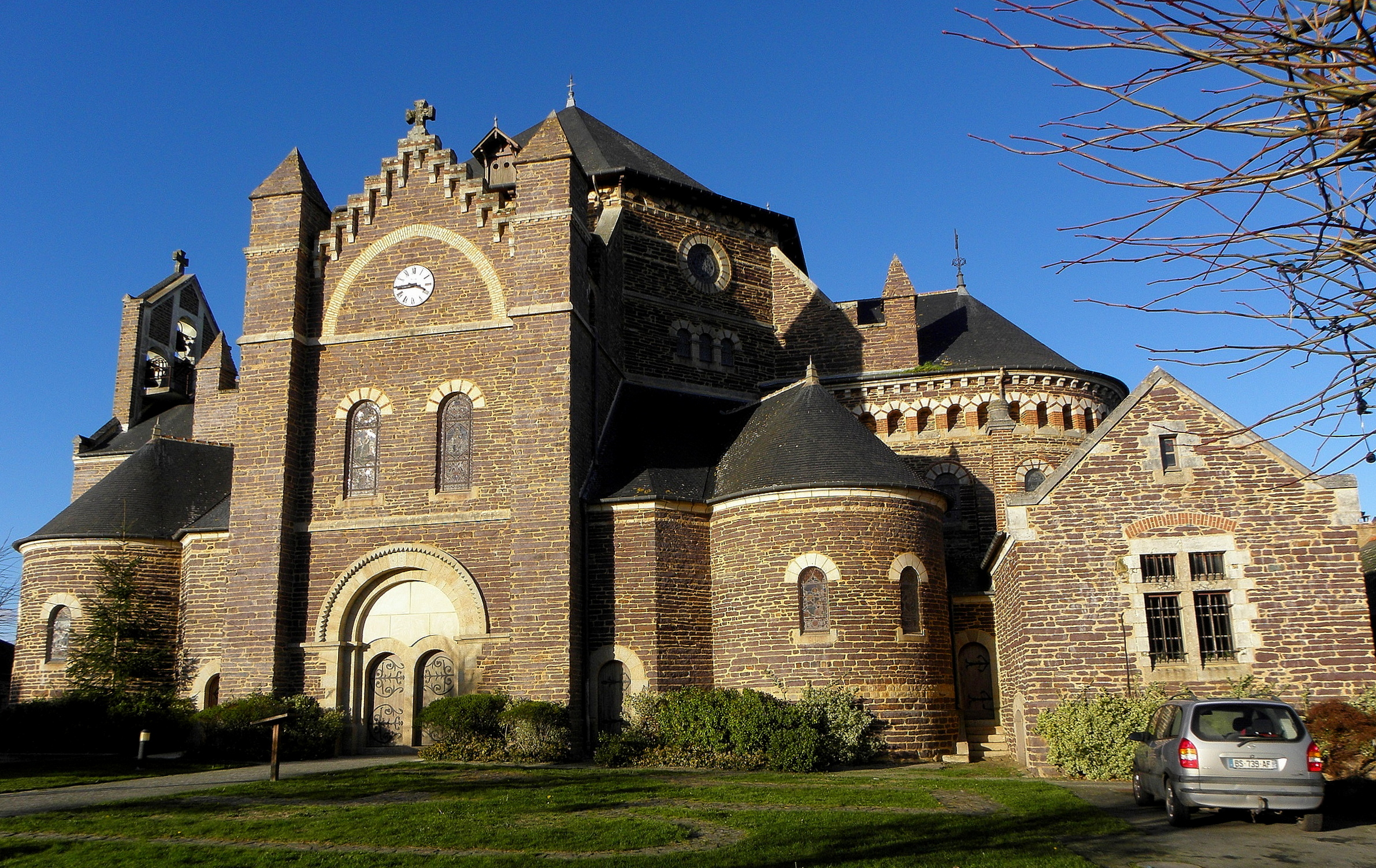
- The parish church of Saint-Maxent

- Coat of arms
- Location of Maxent
- Location within France Location within Brittany
- Coordinates: 47°59′01″N 2°01′56″W
- Country: France
- Region: Brittany
- Department: Ille-et-Vilaine
- Arrondissement: Rennes
- Canton: Montfort-sur-Meu
- Intercommunality: CC de Brocéliande

Government
  - Mayor (2020–2026): Ange Prioul
- Area^{1}: 39.72 km^{2} (15.34 sq mi)
- Highest elevation: 137 m (449 ft)
- Lowest elevation: 51 m (167 ft)
- Population (2023): 1,450
  - Density: 36.5/km^{2} (94.5/sq mi)
- Time zone: UTC+01:00 (CET)
  - Summer (DST): UTC+02:00 (CEST)
- INSEE/Postal code: 35169 /35380
- ^{1} French Land Register data, which excludes lakes, ponds, glaciers > 1 km^{2} (0.386 sq mi or 247 acres) and river estuaries.

Maxent (French pronunciation: [maksɑ̃]; Breton: Skirioù-Masen; Gallo: Maczant) is a commune in the Ille-et-Vilaine department of Brittany in northwestern France.

== Population ==
The inhabitants of Maxent are called maxentais in French.

Historical population
| Year | Pop. | ±% p.a. |
|---|---|---|
| 1968 | 1,149 | — |
| 1975 | 1,087 | −0.79% |
| 1982 | 982 | −1.44% |
| 1990 | 980 | −0.03% |
| 1999 | 1,040 | +0.66% |
| 2007 | 1,234 | +2.16% |
| 2012 | 1,383 | +2.31% |
| 2017 | 1,466 | +1.17% |
| 2023 | 1,450 | −0.18% |
Source: INSEE

== See also ==
- Communes of the Ille-et-Vilaine department
