= Jeanne Tripier =

French artist (1869–1944)

- Born: 1869; Paris, France
- Died: 1944
- Known for: Drawing; Embroidery
- Movement: Art brut; Outsider art
- Patron(s): Jean Dubuffet

Jeanne Tripier (1869–1944) was a French medium who produced works of text, drawing and embroidery under Spiritualist influence. She is considered part of the Art Brut canon.

== Life ==
Jeanne Tripier was born in 1869 in Paris. Daughter of a wine merchant, she spent her childhood in the country with her grandmother. As an adult she lived in the Montmartre district of Paris, working as a salesgirl at a department store. At 58 she developed a passion for Spiritualist doctrines and divination. These activities became central to her existence, so much so that she eventually stopped going to work. In 1934 she was admitted to a psychiatric hospital in Paris.

== Work ==
Jeanne Tripier began creating works which blended image and text when she was in her 50s. Tripier's work emerged during trance states and utilized materials such as sugar and hair dye. She also produced figurative embroidery pieces. She ascribed responsibility for her output of texts, drawings, and embroideries to spiritual entities.

== Collections and exhibits ==
Jeanne Tripier's work is primarily held in the Collection de l'Art Brut museum in Lausanne, Switzerland. Her works have been lent to other institutions for exhibitions, including the 2015 exhibit Art Brut in America: The Incursion of Jean Dubuffet at the American Folk Art Museum.

== Recognition ==
Jean Dubuffet acquired Tripier's work for his Collection de l'Art Brut.

== Bibliography ==
- Écrits d’Art Brut. Graphomanes extravagants, Lucienne Peiry, Paris, Le Seuil, 2020. ISBN 978-2-02-144768-2
