= Daniel Belardinelli =

American painter

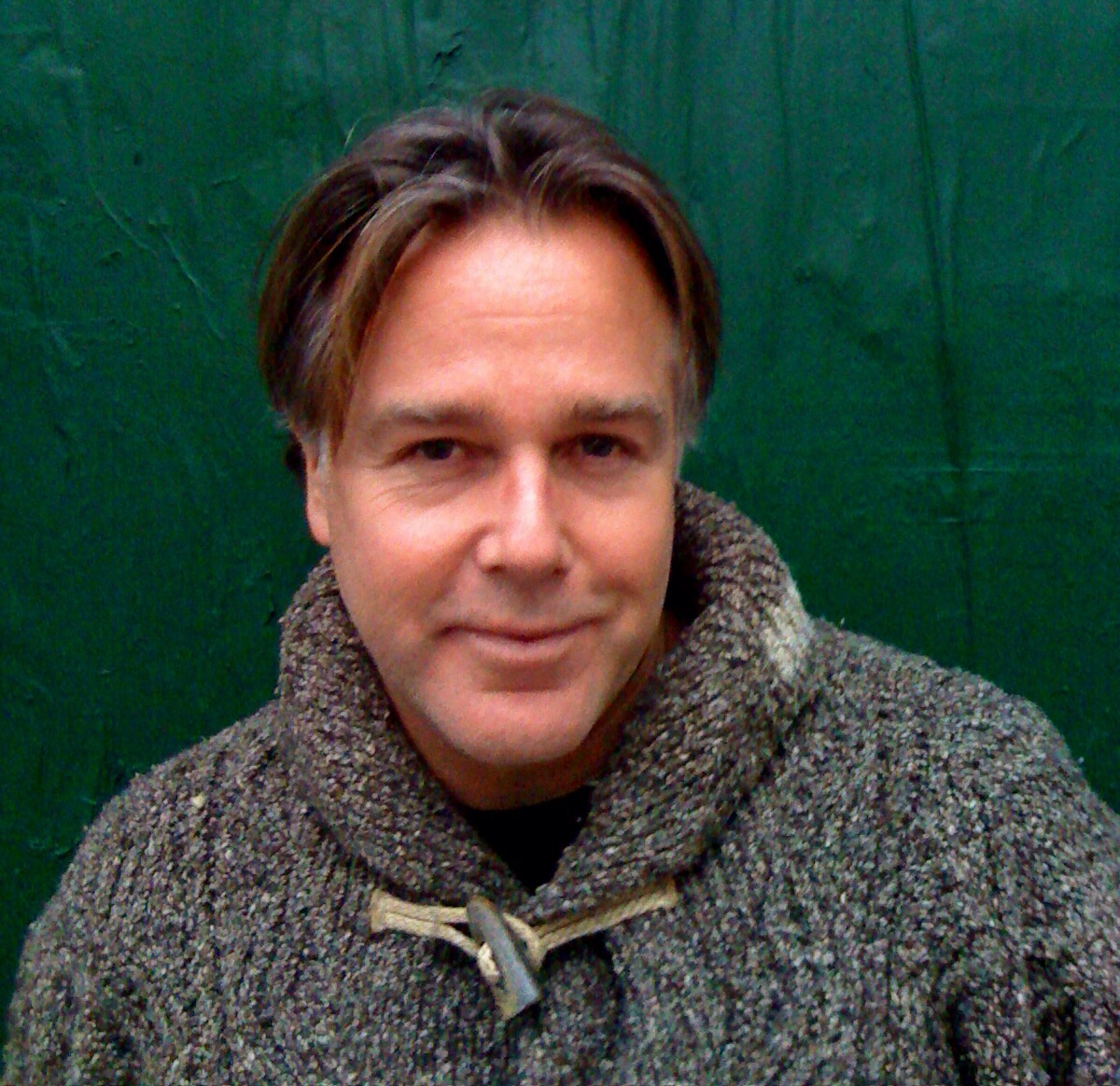
- Belardinelli in 2013
- Education: CUNY School of Law
- Occupation: Artist

Daniel Belardinelli is an American artist associated with outsider art. He is a writer, art dealer, curator and an attorney.

== Early life ==
Daniel Belardinelli was born and raised in Manhattan, New York.

Belardinelli experienced communication difficulties as a child and learned to express himself through artistic compositions. By the age of 15, he frequented Studio 54 and Xenon and, as a result, he met and was influenced by Andy Warhol, Larry Rivers, Christopher Makos and Antonio Lopez. He developed various addictions, but was eventually able to subdue them by drawing and painting about them.

== Personal life ==
Belardinelli booked a ticket on United Airlines Flight 93 for September 11, 2001, a flight that crashed in Shanksville, Pennsylvania. Belardinelli changed his plans at the last minute and did not board the flight. As his uncle, William Cashman, died on the flight, he was allowed to listen to the tapes of the flight and later completed a drawing of what the terrorists had announced over the loudspeaker to the passengers. This drawing was included in Jere Longman's book, Among the Heroes. Belardinelli was featured in the A&E documentary I Missed Flight 93 (2006).

Belardinelli has also resided in Boonton, New Jersey.

== Career ==
Belardinelli uses multiple mediums to paint, with nail polish featuring as a dominant medium of his art since 1985. He draws and paints daily in large 'At-A-Glance' journals which bear witness to his life. He has exhibited at the Outsider Art Fair annually since 1995, and his work has been displayed in the American Visionary Art Museum. In 2001, several of Belardinelli's nail polish paintings were included in the "High On Life – Transcending Addictions" show, which was curated by Tom Paterson at AVAM. He has participated in "Revelations and Reflections of American Self Taught Artists", and has exhibited worldwide, but most extensively in Europe and the Americas. He was listed in "Outsider Art Fair: 10 Artists to Buy Now" in The Daily Beast.

Belardinelli has no formal art training, but is a graduate of City University of New York School of Law. He is an attorney licensed by The State Bar of New Jersey (both State and Federal Courts), the Southern and Eastern Federal District Courts of New York State and The United States Supreme Court in Washington, DC. He was an organizer of the 501(3)(c) nonprofit organization, "The New Jersey Volunteer Lawyers Association," and has been a featured artist in their annual fundraiser.
