= Susan Subtle =

American columnist and curator (1941–2020)

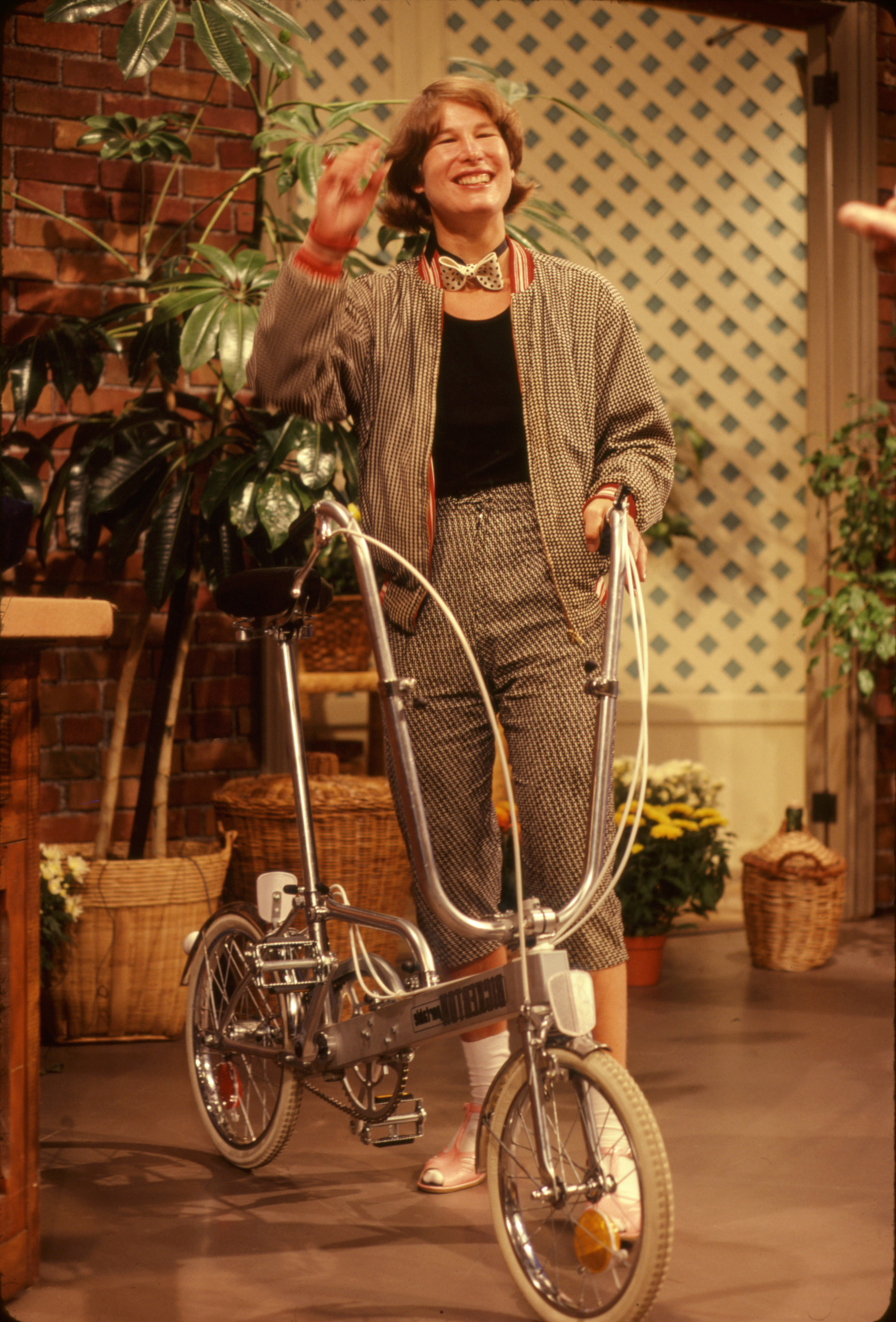
- Susan Subtle on the KGO morning talk show – 1985
- Born: December 30, 1941; Atlantic City, New Jersey, US
- Died: May 11, 2020 (aged 78); Berkeley, California, US
- Other name: Susan Subtle Dintenfass
- Education: University of Pennsylvania
- Occupations: curator, columnist, product developer
- Website: helloagain.com

Susan Subtle (December 30, 1941 – May 11, 2020) was an American curator, columnist, and product developer; known for her curatorial work focusing on recycled and outsider art. Subtle lived and worked in Berkeley, California until her death in May, 2020.

== Early life and education ==
Raised in Atlantic City, New Jersey, Subtle studied at the University of Wisconsin before receiving a degree in economics in 1963 from the University of Pennsylvania. After college, Subtle moved to the University of Oxford for graduate studies where she studied the labor politics of Yugoslavia. She did not complete her thesis and moved to Berkeley, California, in 1967.

== Work and life ==
Subtle's work spanned many subjects from recycling, entertainment, west coast art, outsider art, innovative products, to general oddities. Subtle wrote columns and articles for numerous publications including "Best Bets" in New West Magazine, "The Subtle Shopper" and "Please Mr. Postman" in the San Francisco Chronicle, as well as other publications including the LA Times, Elle Decor, NY Post, Esquire, Ms. (magazine), and Oui Magazine.

In 1970, horse breeder Edwin Janss Jr named a foal after Subtle. The daughter of Hot Curl and Hillary, Susan Subtle had 48 Starts, 9 Wins, 6 Places, 7 Shows, and career earnings of $77,913. Susan Subtle, the horse, retired in 1977.

In 1993, Tony Warren authored a book, Foot of the Rainbow, and dedicated it to Susan Subtle, the human.

== Curation ==
=== Hello Again! ===
Subtle made her curatorial debut in 1997 with Hello Again!, a recycled art focused show, opening at the Oakland Museum. The show would travel, going on to show at the Los Angeles Municipal Gallery, Texas International Museum of Art & Science, Vancouver Museum, and the McColl Center for Art + Innovation, in Charlotte.

The show's core elements remained the same as it traveled with Subtle curating in additional art made by local artists. Chocolatier Joseph Schmidt Confections donated broken bits of chocolates which were served at the opening in Oakland in dialogue with the recycled nature of the show.

Mildred Howard, Mark Bulwinkle, Clayton Bailey, Claire Graham, Jan Yager, Leo Sewell, Remi Rubel, Pippa Garner, and Valerie Hardy Raven were some of the featured artists of the show.

The show was reviewed in Artforum as a "Real Life Rock Greil Marcus’" Top Ten.

=== We Are Not Alone: Angels and Other Aliens ===
Working as a guest curator with the American Visionary Art Museum and founder Rebecca Hoffberger, Subtle organized a show focused on artists who experienced the extraterrestrial in some shape and form. "We Are Not Alone" presented over 90 outsider artists—some who claimed to be abducted by aliens and some claiming to be visited by them and some who were outsider artists with extraterrestrial art or personality. The show ran at the museum in Baltimore, MD from Oct 2nd 1999 to Sept 3. 2000.

The artists included Adolf Wölfli, Albert Louden, Anselme Boix-Vives, Chris Hipkiss, August Walla, Raymond Materson, Ionel Talpazan, Edmund Monseil, Eugene Gabritschevsky, Francois Burland, Friedrich Schröder Sonnenstern, Johann Garber, Madge Gill, Oswald Tschirtner, Perifimou, Raphaël Lonné, Salvatore Bonura, Sava Sekulic. Scottie Wilson, Louis Soutter, Albert Hoffman (artist), Albert Zahn house, Alyne Harris, Andrea Badami, Annie Hooper, Bruno Sowa, Charley Kinney, Earnest Patton, Elijah Pierce, Frank Jones, Homer Green, Howard Finster, Jake McCord, Lorenzo Scott, Minnie Evans, Myrtice West, R. A. Miller, Raymond Coins, Sam Doyle, Shane Campbell, Sister Gertrude Morgan, Stanislaw Mika, Sulton Rogers, Victor Joseph Gatto, Albert "Kid" Mertz, Darwin Bill, James Castle, Laure Pigeon, Lucy Estrin, Madge Gill, Margarete Held, Miss Lucy, Raphael Lonne, St. Eom, William Shaw, Devon Smith, Charles W. Hutson, David Butler, Derek Webster, Dwight Mckintosh, Eggert Magnusson, Ernest "Popeye" Reed, Eugene Von Bruenchienhein, Florence Saville Berryman, Grant Wallace, Helen Kossoff, Henry Darger, Howard Finster, Jack Zwirz, Jake McCord, Jon Serl, Justin McCarthy, Louis Monza, Alexander A. Maldonado, Minnie Evans, Ned Cartledge, Nellie Mae Roe, Joao Cosme Felix, Norbert Kox, Pauline Simon, Raymond Materson, Simon Sparrow, Ulysses Davis, Victor Joseph Gatto, William Hawkins, Bessie Harvey, Andrew J. Epstein, Betty Andreasson Luca, Clarence and Grace Woolsey, Charles A.A. Dellschau, Gene Watson, Juanita Rodgers, Ken Grimes, Paul Laffoley, Peter Charlie Besharo, Lyle Still, and Uri Geller

=== Return Engagement ===
In 2002, Subtle curated a show at Copia: The American Center for Wine, Food & the Arts titled "Return Engagement". This show referenced the content of Subtle's previous shows, presenting outsider and extraterrestrial art.

== Writing ==
Subtle began her journalism career in 1974 with an article in Esquire Magazine titled "Their Arts Belong to Dada" featuring west coast fashion and art. The article featured artists Clayton Bailey, Lowell Darling, Anna Banana, Ant Farm (group), Futzie Nutzle, Dr. Brute & Lady Brute, Mr. Peanut, Irene Dogmatic, AA Bronson, Captain Video, Flakey Rrose Hip, Henry Humble, The Gluers and Dickens Bascom, Don and Rae Davis, and T.R. Uthco.

In 1975, Subtle wrote an article titled: "The Rockettes: 50 Years Old And Still Kicking" published by Ms. Magazine, photographed by Bud Lee and designed by Bea Feitler.

From 1975 to 1982, Subtle wrote articles and columns for New West Magazine.

From 1982 to 1985, Subtle wrote columns for the San Francisco Chronicle.

In 1990, Subtle featured Creative Growth Art Center in the October issue of Elle Decor in an article tilted "Aimed Straight From The Heart". She reviewed the organization highly, comparing the style of art made at creative growth to outsider, primitive, naive, brut, and early-American folk art.

Publications contributed to:

- California Living
- California Magazine
- Des Moines Skywalker
- Elle Decor
- Esquire Magazine
- Los Angeles Times
- Metropolitan Home
- Ms. Magazine
- New Dawn
- New West Magazine
- NY Daily News Sunday Magazine
- NY Post
- Oui Magazine
- San Francisco Chronicle
- San Francisco Examiner
- San Francisco Garbage Company Newsletter
- San Jose Mercury
- WomenSports
- Working Woman

Subtle contributed to three books. She originated, with Rod Kennedy, the concept for the book Atlantic City, 125 years of ocean madness: starring Miss America, Mr. Peanut, Lucy the Elephant, the High Diving Horse, and four generations of Americans cutting loose published in 1979. She co-wrote, with Ruth Reichl and Ken Dollar, The Contest Book: 299 Unusual Contests You Can Enter!!!!! published in New York by Harmony in 1979. She co-wrote, with Michael Lester, How to have fun with your body with Illustrations by Kim Deitch, published by Houghton Mifflin in 1986.

== Products ==
Subtle co-founded an art group and design company called Subtle Bananas with Valerie Hardy. They participated in exhibitions and designed business cards and stationery for clients. In 1974, Susan Berman wrote an article in the SF Examiner featuring the company.

After the Subtle Bananas company, Subtle founded the Subtle Corporation. The Subtle Corp developed many products with the most successful product being the Subtles eyeglass cords, which employ a variety of creatures to help you hang onto your glasses.
