= Joseph Franklin =

Joseph Franklin may refer to:

- Joe Franklin (1926–2015), stage name of Joseph Fortgang, American radio talk-show host
- Joseph A. Franklin (1868–1948), American labor union leader
- Joseph John Franklin (1870–1940), American Medal of Honor recipient
- Joseph Paul Franklin (1950–2013), American serial killer
- Joseph Franklin (composer), American composer
- Joe L. Franklin (1906–1982), American chemist and professor

== See also ==
- Joe Frank (disambiguation)
