= John Jonik =

American cartoonist (born 1942)

John Jonik (born April 30, 1942) is an American artist, cartoonist, writer, and activist known for his fine art, gag cartoons, commercial art, and political cartoons from the late 1960s to the 2020s. Notable works include a community mural, paintings, snow globe designs, and cartoons for The New York Times, The New Yorker, and F&SF. Jonik is also active with the Philadelphia Dumpster Divers, a found object art collective dedicated to creative reuse. His lifelong interest in games and puzzles led him to create the schizonym, a new kind of visual pun.

== Early life and education ==
Jonik was born on April 30, 1942, in Philadelphia, Pennsylvania, to Edward L. and Mary Jonik (née Prior), active members of their local rowing community. His father was part of the Fairmount Rowing Association and a professor of accounting at Villanova University. Jonik's mother was a founding member of the Philadelphia Girls' Rowing Club, the first rowing club for women in that region. Jonik grew up with three other brothers and two twin sisters in Havertown. His sisters, Marie and Ann, competed for the United States women's national rowing team in the 1970s and later went to the 1976 Summer Olympics as alternates.

In Upper Darby, Jonik attended Monsignor Bonner High School. Jonik excelled at crew and at the age of 16 won numerous events for his school. After graduation, he studied at Villanova for a year. During his time there, he was a general staff member of The Villanovan student newspaper, with a gag cartoon panel series called The River Styx appearing regularly in the early 1960s. He transferred to the Pennsylvania Academy of Fine Arts where he received multiple travel scholarships, allowing him to visit Europe, Australia, and the South Sea Islands. After college, Jonik began creating art in various mediums and showing his work in Philadelphia art galleries.

== Career ==
Jonik told fellow cartoonist Mark Heath in 1999 that he viewed himself as a painter who sold cartoons. His political cartoons are known for their critiques of power, from the corporate to the political, and for his attacks on the influence of lobbyists. Heath describes Jonik's style as suggestive of "a quilted image, with the wavering line of a needle's path."

=== Ardmore Junction mural ===
External image
- Ardmore mural, 1968

In 1968, Jonik was working at Delaware Valley Institute, where he taught art, English, and mechanical drawing. Around October of that year, he came up with the idea for a mural. He recalled, "When I see big empty spaces, I get the urge to paint on them." What initially began as a homage to his pet duck, led to others joining him and turning it into a community mural. Jonik's twin sisters, friends, and other residents of Havertown, painted the wall of an underpass at West Hathaway Lane and Haverford Road in Ardmore, then known as the Red Arrow tunnel, but currently known as the Ardmore Junction station.

Red Arrow, formally known as the Philadelphia Suburban Transportation Company, objected to the mural at first, with the Haverford police taking Jonik into custody. No charges were filed, but he was given two weeks to remove the work. Friends and family soon launched a formal petition known as the "Merwood Citizens to Preserve the Wall Monument", with 20 people picketing the site. Some people were taken in by the police for picketing without a license and later released. The group invited Merritt H. Taylor Jr., the president of Red Arrow, to visit the mural for himself, which he did, reversing course and giving it his official approval and re-classifying it as a beautification project. SEPTA later acquired Red Arrow Lines in 1970. (Note: "In 1970 – SEPTA acquired the Philadelphia Suburban Transportation Company – also known as the Red Arrow Lines – which included the Philadelphia and Western Railroad (P&W) route now called the Norristown High-Speed Line, the Media and Sharon Hill Lines (Routes 101 and 102) and several suburban bus routes in Delaware County.")

The mural features Jonik's early experiments with visual puns. Examples include a duck with its head bent down—"ducking"; a rake with ears on its handle—an "earache"; a pack of cigarettes with Wolves as its brand—"a pack of wolves"; an angry bull with a bomb inside it—"abominable"; a ball of many feet—"football"; eyes with whips—"eyelashes"; a rainbow that is unhappy—"crossbow"; and the Greek letter pi made of apples—"apple pie". The mural lasted for 14 years until a graffiti removal project by SEPTA destroyed it in 1983. A team of Transportation Authority workers set out to remove graffiti from the nearby and similarly named Ardmore Station. By mistake, they sandblasted and whitewashed the Ardmore Junction mural. The removal evoked public condemnation and was said to encourage more graffiti by leaving a blank wall in its place for others to deface.

=== Commercial art ===
External image
- "Bunker Madness", 1987

Jonik worked as a commercial artist from 1977 to 2011 for Enesco and Silvestri, who sold many of his products. Enesco adapted his cartoons into snow globe designs, selling them in Germany and Japan, where they became best-sellers. Notable designs include:

- "Strike it Rich" (1985), an older man in a suit and tie sitting on a pile of money while looking up and raising his hands; the snow takes the form of greenbacks raining down into his open arms
- "Bunker Madness" (1987), a man taking a golf swing from a bunker or sand trap with the snow taking the color of sand
- "Bowler" (1987-1988), a man in a bowling alley with snow taking the form of bowling notation or bowling scoring symbols
- "Careless Cat" (1989), marketed as "Meeeouch!", depicting a cat leering over a fishbowl only to get its tail caught in a floor fan. The snow takes the color of cat hair that is dislodged by the fan.

=== Cartooning ===
External image
- "Untitled" (Snow Shoveler), 1977

After university, Jonik got his start as a professional cartoonist in the 1970s with sales to Golf Magazine and Ski Magazine. Other sales to national magazines followed. In 1974, he sold 48 cartoons, totaling about $3,905 ($25,493 in 2025) in sales. He performed slightly better the next year. The New Yorker turned down his submissions for ten years before finally accepting them. By the late 1990s, he was selling original drawings for as much as $1,000 ($1,933 in 2025) a piece. Jonik's cartoons have appeared in Audubon, The New York Times, Esquire, National Lampoon, The American Bystander, The Wall Street Journal, The New Yorker, Playboy, Cosmopolitan, and Mad Magazine, among many others. He also wrote for many smaller publications including Z Magazine, Earth First! Journal, The Ecologist, and Funny Times.

External image
- "Untitled" (First Thanksgiving at Plymouth), 1977.

==== Gag cartoons ====
Typical, but widely celebrated gag cartoons during Jonik's early to middle period include 37 single-panel gag cartoons for The New Yorker from 1975 to 2006. One captionless and untitled winter cartoon is known as the "Snow Shoveler" (1977). It shows an unhappy man holding a snow shovel at his side while looking up at the snowfall; the man is standing inside a snow globe. This cartoon was chosen as one of a set of favorites by 60 Minutes. Another favorite, chosen by cartoonist and editor Bob Mankoff, is an untitled, captionless cartoon from 1983 that depicts a variation on the first Thanksgiving at Plymouth. (Note: See The First Thanksgiving at Plymouth (1914) by Jennie Augusta Brownscombe and The First Thanksgiving, 1621 (c. 1912–1915) by Jean Leon Gerome Ferris as two examples of American historical genre painting depicting the Thanksgiving narrative.) The panel shows men in the background playing American football in a match between the Native Americans and the Pilgrims. The women are seen in the foreground looking unhappy as they wait to eat, with the food sitting ready on the table.

Jonik also created more than 50 cartoons for The Magazine of Fantasy & Science Fiction (F&SF) from 1987 to 2012. One gag cartoon in F&SF depicts competing Bronze Age craftsmen building different types of vessels, presumably to survive a future flood in the literary tradition of the Genesis flood narrative. In the left foreground, a carpenter is seen building a ship out of wood like the kind depicted in the story of Noah's Ark. Except, he has stopped building for the moment to stare into the distance, where in the right background of the panel, he sees another builder like himself constructing a futuristic submarine, also out of wood.

==== Political cartoons ====
External image
- "The American People Have Spoken", c. 1996

From his middle to late period, Jonik started to focus more on politics in his cartooning as a response to the Gulf War air campaign in 1991. (Note: "Jonik began doing political Cartoons on January 17, 1991 — the day George H. W. Bush started bombing Iraq.") The Anderson Valley Advertiser (TVA) began publishing Jonik's political cartoons in their broadsheet in the 1990s. One notable example, "The American People Have Spoken" (c. 1996), depicts two people, seemingly politicians, with dollar sign armbands at a lectern in front of a large crowd in good spirits. The people are holding signs while free-floating, uncontained dialogue appears above their heads. The signs read, "Yes to costly health care", "Please tap our computer messages!", "Limit our internet freedom!", "Pave our farm lands!", "No laws for industry", Don't tell us what's in our food!", "More celeb news", and "Give us e-coli burgers".

One person in the front of the crowd is seen with a button on their shirt that says "[No] Art", with a prohibition symbol drawn through the word. Above the crowd, four messages float in the air, indicating they are emanating from the voices of the people: "We want dirtier air and water so CEOs can make more money!", "Send our jobs overseas!", "Stop giving us benefits from our tax money!", and "Give our forests to the timber companies now!" At the bottom, the title of the cartoon is displayed. "The American People Have Spoken" was used by sociologist Richard H. Robbins to illustrate the second edition of Global Problems and the Culture of Capitalism (2002), a textbook on economic history. Robbins uses the cartoon to offer critical commentary on the global nature of capitalism, noting that the cartoon depicts what he sees as the undue influence of corporations over voters, persuading them to support ideas in opposition to their own interests.

External image
- "Demoncracy", c. 2012

"Demoncracy" (c. 2012), a panel that is part of Jonik's election series of political cartoons, was published by TVA in August 2015. TVA writer Jeff Costello discussed the cartoon in critical commentary about the class struggle in the United States. Jonik's cartoon depicts two demons, complete with horns and a goatee, sitting down in a control room, drinking champagne and smoking cigars. Smiling, the demons stare into a large, one-way mirror that shows a polling place in the next room. The words "VOTE" are shown, featuring two competing candidates below it, with "Greater of Two Evils" under one, followed by "or", the "Lesser of Two Evils" under another. A frowning voter steps into the booth, ready to cast their ballot.

=== Philadelphia Dumpster Divers ===
External image
- Portrait of John Jonik with Perched Creature, 2021

Jonik began working with the Philadelphia Dumpster Divers found object art collective in the 1990s, with Metropolitan Home making mention of his collaboration with the group in 1995. In the article, Jonik speaks to the ethos of sharing pieces within the collective. If they acquire an object that they do not personally like for their own work, they will often pass it on (Note: The group later coined the term garbitrage to describe the use of found trash as currency.) to other members of the group who might use it in their work instead.

The group hands out annual awards each year, but one year Jonik made a joke about the Lighthouse Keeper Award, an award made from trash, so the group began giving him the award exclusively, but in large amounts, leaving him with piles of lighthouse junk as an annual gag. According to custom, the awards may be re-awarded to others. Jonik spoke to The Philadelphia Inquirer about how he incorporates recycled materials such as wood and glass into his work during an environmentally friendly-themed exhibition for the Dumpster Divers at Philadelphia City Hall in 2008.

=== Schizonyms ===
Jonik's background growing up with parents in academia and his lifelong interest in word games and crossword puzzles led him to invent the schizonym, a visual pun based on two words derived from a single word with the removal of the first letter, giving it multiple meanings. The "dual personality" of the word is then used to create a singular artwork with a visual pun combining both.

For example, a "beagle" is expressed by Jonik as an image of an eagle with the head of a dog. In its right talons it carries an olive branch, and in its left, dog bones (to chew). For the word "bass", Jonik creates an image of a donkey, complete with head and four legs, swimming underwater with the body of a sunfish. Jonik invented enough of these illustrations to publish a book featuring his collected work in 2022.

== Personal life ==
Jonik was friends with composer Joseph Franklin of the Relâche music collective, who wrote fondly about him in his book Settling Scores: A Life in the Margins of American Music (2006). Franklin recalls that Jonik was a fan of Philip Glass and oddly collected Volkswagen Type 3 "squarebacks", owning at least five of them in different cities.

Franklin also remembers a humorous incident in the late 1980s during a Relâche ensemble performance of "Ryoanji", a quiet piece by John Cage, so quiet that the audience could hear a woman nursing her child in the back of the hall, with the suckling sounds clearly audible. Jonik, who was sitting in the audience with his partner, leaned over to her and whispered, "From now on this is going to be our song", which led to the audience barely able to contain their laughter during the piece.

== Legacy ==
External image
- "But, seriously...", 1996.

Jonik's work inspired others, including cartoonists like Charles Addams, who went so far as to purchase an idea from Jonik for a cover he reworked for The New Yorker, turning it into one of his most "haunting" Halloween covers for the magazine (Self-carve Pumpkin, 1989).

Jonik's own cartoons are featured widely by other authors in a diverse number of different fields, from academic textbooks to nonfiction. Cartoons like "But, seriously..." (1996) have been used by psychologists to discuss the psychology of humor, and by drama scholars to discuss the phenomenon of laughter within the modern cultural history of comedy. Literary critics have also used Jonik's cartoons to discuss the role of contemporary political art and political activism in American culture.

A short 15-minute, biographical film about his life, John Jonik: A Miniography, was made in 1978 and released in 1979. The film is described as a "documentary portrait of an off-beat cartoonist and artist whose lifestyle and philosophy stress the importance of using everything, wasting nothing." Jonik's cartoons and manuscripts are held by the Kislak Center for Special Collections, Rare Books and Manuscripts, at the University of Pennsylvania.

== Exhibitions ==
- 30th Year Anniversary Show (Dupree Gallery, 2022) object trouvé
- Alchemy Illuminated: The Art of Crafting from Trash (The Neon Museum of Philadelphia, 2021)
  - Perched Creature (2021) object trouvé
- PAFA Fellowship 2021 Exhibition (Gross McCleaf Gallery, 2021)
  - Orbs, 2021. Oil on canvas, 36 × 21 inches (91 × 53 cm). painting
- Re-Crafted (Dupree Gallery, 2018) object trouvé
- Dumpster Diversions (2017) object trouvé
- From Trashstream to Mainstream (2017) object trouvé
- If Walls Could Talk (Dupree Gallery, 2016) painting
- Upcycling, The Art of the Dumpster Divers (GoggleWorks, 2015) object trouvé
- The Green Exhibit (Philadelphia City Hall, 2008) object trouvé
- 25 X 25 (Art on the Avenue Gallery, 2006) object trouvé
- Dumpster Divers (Salon des Amis Gallery, 2001) object trouvé
- Cartoon and Humor Show (Salon de Amis Gallery, 2000) cartoon
- Philadelphia Cartoonists (University City Arts League, 1998) cartoon
- John Jonik (Cabrini College, 1988) cartoon
- Peter Schnore and John Jonik (Vendo Nubes Gallery, 1974) painting
- John Jonik (Vendo Nubes Gallery, 1968) painting

== Selected work ==
Descriptions for The New Yorker cartoons originate from The Cartoon Bank.

As sole author or contributor

- Schizonyms: Words with Dual Personalities (AuthorHouse, 2022)
- Censored 2008: The Top 25 Censored Stories (Seven Stories Press, 2007)

Anthologies

- The New Yorker Encyclopedia of Cartoons (Hachette Book Group, 2018)
- Movies Movies Movies: An Entertainment of Great Film Cartoons (HarperCollins, 1990)
- Moms, Moms, Moms: A Mirthful Merriment of Cartoons (Harper & Row, 1990)
- Golf Golf Golf: A Hilarious Collection of Cartoons (Harper & Row, 1989)
- Animals, Animals, Animals: A Collection of Great Animal Cartoons (Harper & Row, 1979)
- National Lampoon's Cartoons Even We Wouldn't Dare Print: A Collection of Thoroughly Reprehensible Cartoons (1979)

The New Yorker cartoons

- "Untitled" (Blues musician playing guitar and singing to employee at 'Complaints' department window) (February 6, 2006)
- "For heaven's sake! You're retired. Give it up!" (August 19, 2002)
- "Untitled" (Viking standing on winners platform with bloody sword and spear in hand. Second and third place are vacant) (July 16, 2001)
- "Untitled" (A sign outside a rural town reads: 'Welcome! To Insuranceville U.S.A.' A second sign lists all the various things not allowed, behind this, a third sign reads: Speed Limit 10) (January 25, 1999)
- "The St. Nicholas Day Massacre" (January 11, 1999)
- "He knows when you are sleeping. He knows when you're awake." (December 21, 1998)
- "Untitled" (Sign in front of heaven's gates reads: ENTERING HEAVEN POP. 8) (February 3, 1997)
- "But, seriously..." (May 13, 1996)
- "Untitled" (Woman at crosswalk notices it cost money for the walk signal to cross the street) (March 25, 1996)
- "Untitled" (Man walking down beach sees sign: PAY TOLL 500 FT) (July 24, 1995)
- "The End of the Week is Coming!" (July 17, 1995)
- "How much longer, roughly, will you be introducing me as 'a disgruntled Republican'?" (April 12, 1993)
- "Untitled" (Tombstone reads, Colonel Olin T. Hunt [Deceased]) (March 2, 1992)
- "Untitled" (Mental image of light bulb above man who is looking at an empty lighting fixture) (January 27, 1992)
- "Untitled" (King sits at a table and sees hand rising from his bowl, holding a spoon as if it were Excalibur) (July 22, 1991)
- "Untitled" (Apples and oranges) (July 15, 1991)
- "Untitled" (A man outside his house looks at the moon. He is surprised to see a shadow puppet on its surface) (April 16, 1990)
- "Brig. Gen. Matt Gandhi" (September 12, 1988)
- "Untitled" (A medieval looking man is standing on a lakeshore looking out at the lake where one hand is holding up a sword and another a pen) (August 15, 1988)
- "Movies Made For Under Eight Million Dollars" (July 10, 1989)
- "With the pretzels I recommend a hearty burgundy, with the goldfish a blanc de blancs." (June 12, 1989)
- "Untitled" (Four buildings lined up on a street have signs which read, respectively "Eat", "Drink", "Be Merry'" and "Jail") (September 7, 1987)
- "Untitled" (Mother in doorway; her arm tattoo reads: Son. Her son, slumped on stoop with beer in hand, has a tattoo that reads: Mother) (May 8, 1989)
- "The Milky Way" (April 13, 1987)
- "Untitled" (First Thanksgiving where the pilgrims and the Indians are starting a football game) (November 28, 1983)
- "I don't recall you ever complaining about cold legs." (February 14, 1983)
- "Untitled" (On bathroom sink, faucets are labeled "Left" and "Right", rather than "Hot" and "Cold") (February 22, 1982)
- "Untitled" (Bird in cage makes circular motion with his wing next to his ear, as he indicates to another bird that bird in cuckoo clock is nuts.) (November 16, 1981)
- "Now, that's a welcome sight! I was just beginning to miss decision-making." (September 28, 1981)
- "Untitled" (Farmer, with rake, has "Born To Raise Tomatoes" tattooed on his arm) (April 20, 1981)
- "Untitled" (Weathervane is designed to show man running after hat) (September 18, 1978)
- "Do you have any idea how deep this would be if it were snow?" (February 27, 1978)
- "Untitled" (Man inside a snow globe looks up at falling snow. He holds a shovel) (February 14, 1977)
- "Untitled" (Clock face has numbers 1, 2, 3, and then "etc.") (September 20, 1976)
- "Untitled" (Bug looks at a sign in front of flowers that says, 'NO BUGS') (July 19, 1976)
- "Untitled" (Man and woman carry suitcases with stickers on them from Jersey City, Newark, Darien, Hoboken, Passaic, East Orange, etc.) (April 12, 1976)
- "Untitled" (Man sawing through box with plank sticking out of both sides. Take off of magician sawing a woman in half) (February 17, 1975)

The New York Times

- "If you wish to not smoke, sir, we have a 'no smoking' car for that purpose." (September 27, 1981)
- "Miss Galloway, take a postcard." (August 23, 1981)
- "Untitled" (A castaway on a tiny desert island surrounded by the ocean is seen "steering" the island using an old ship's wheel) (March 8, 1981)
- "Untitled" (Man in baggage claim glances at recently arrived checked baggage near conveyor belt, one of which is a child) (March 2, 1980)
- "Untitled" (Triptych showing a man hiking, with the sounds of nature only occurring in his presence) (January 14, 1979)
- "¿Quien?" (December 17, 1978)
- "Mole Xing" (April 2, 1978).)
- "100% Natural Bridge" (February 19, 1978)
- "You're right. This does look like a good place." (February 13, 1977).
- "Untitled" (Ostrich with head buried) (October 24, 1976).
- "Untitled" (A hobo waits at an airport baggage claim for his bindle to arrive on the conveyor) (March 5, 1978)
- "Untitled" (Car with sticker "Warning: I brake for animals" waits in front of a large elephant crossing the road) (November 30, 1975)

F&SF

- "Untitled" (Snowman shown with a tattoo that says "Born to Melt") (2000)
- "Untitled" (A witch flying comfortably in a chair with each of the four chair legs made from broomsticks; the full moon is visible) (1997)
- "Untitled" (The town of "Coincidenceberg") (1997)
- "Untitled" (Man discovers a snowman lying on the sidewalk, stabbed in the back) (1996)
- "One of the first things you have to learn is not to get up so fast." (1995)
- "Untitled" (The muse) (December 1995)
- "How it ends" (1993)
- "Man from Mars"
- "They seem friendly enough. But still, somehow, I don't like their looks."
- "Glenn, I don't believe you met my cousin, Billy Bob"
- "Untitled" (A tree without leaves is eating breakfast at the table. The clock reads April. Leaves are starting to bud on its branches) (1991)
- "Untitled" (A woman sees a flying rabbit with wings steal her carrots from her high-rise apartment balcony garden) (1990)
- "Well, I wouldn't call it 'Quicksand', but all the same I'm relieved that someone showed up." (1990)
- "Untitled" (A witch looks out the window of her candy house towards the lot next door, where a man is building a house made from toothpaste tubes and toothbrushes) (1990)
- "OK. You're the ghost of Christmas present. Quite amusing. Now, go away!" (1990)
- "Untitled" (The Little Match Girl is confronted by Smokey Bear in a snowstorm) (1990)
