= Philadelphia Dumpster Divers =

American art collective

The Philadelphia Dumpster Divers are a group of Philadelphia-area based artists, collectors and friends who work largely with found objects and recycled materials. The group was originally founded by neon sign artist Len Davidson and photojournalist Neil Benson. It first established itself on April Fools Day in 1992 with a core group of seven founding members along with Davidson and Benson including Harry Anderson, Kate Bartoldus, Dave Dobkin, Leo Sewell, and Joel Spivack.

The group originally met at a diner at 5th and Spring Garden, and had planned to call the group "The Dumpster Diners" to meet in diners and talk about found objects. They decided not to use the name since it was misleading, as it implied they were eating food found in dumpsters rather than making art. Their work appeared outside Pennsylvania in a New Jersey-themed exhibition at the Noyes Museum in 2009. Mayor Michael Nutter officially recognized their efforts in creating sustainable art with a proclamation in 2012.

== Members ==
- Betsy Alexander
- Kim Alsbrooks
- Gretchen Altabef
- Harry Anderson
- Sara Benowitz
- Ellen Benson
- Neil Benson
- I. George Bilyk
- Valerie Black
- Robert Bullock
- Charmaine Caire
- Randall Cleaver
- Alden Cole
- Carol Cole
- cdavid Cottrill
- Randy Dalton
- Len Davidson
- Donn 'Mondo' DesChaine
- Charna Eisner
- Dan Enright
- George Felice
- Gwendolyn Fryer
- Bruce Gast
- David Gerbstadt
- Joanne Hoffman
- Linda Lou Horn
- Hugo Hsu
- John Jonik
- Ann Keech
- Diane Keller
- Smokie Kittner
- Vance Lehmkuhl
- John Lindsay
- Leslie Matthews
- Kate Mellina
- Susan Moloney
- Bob Murphy
- Taji Nahl
- Toni Nash
- Kathryn Pannepacker
- Dr. Photon
- Eva Preston
- Joe Revlock
- Susan Richards
- Ellen Sall
- Leo Sewell
- Michael Simons
- Joel Spivak
- Jim Ulrich
- Sally Willowbee
- Burnell Yow!
- Isaiah Zagar

== Exhibitions ==
- Made and Remade – The Art of the Philadelphia Dumpster Divers (2025)
- Saving Philadelphia: The Art of the Dumpster Divers (2004)

== Publications ==
Featuring their work

- Skinner, Tina (2009). Found Object Art II. Schiffer Pub. Ltd. ISBN 9780764331626. OCLC 264045496.
