= Fine Arts Work Center =

Nonprofit organization in Provincetown, Massachusetts

Coordinates: 42°03′19.94″N 70°11′04.13″W

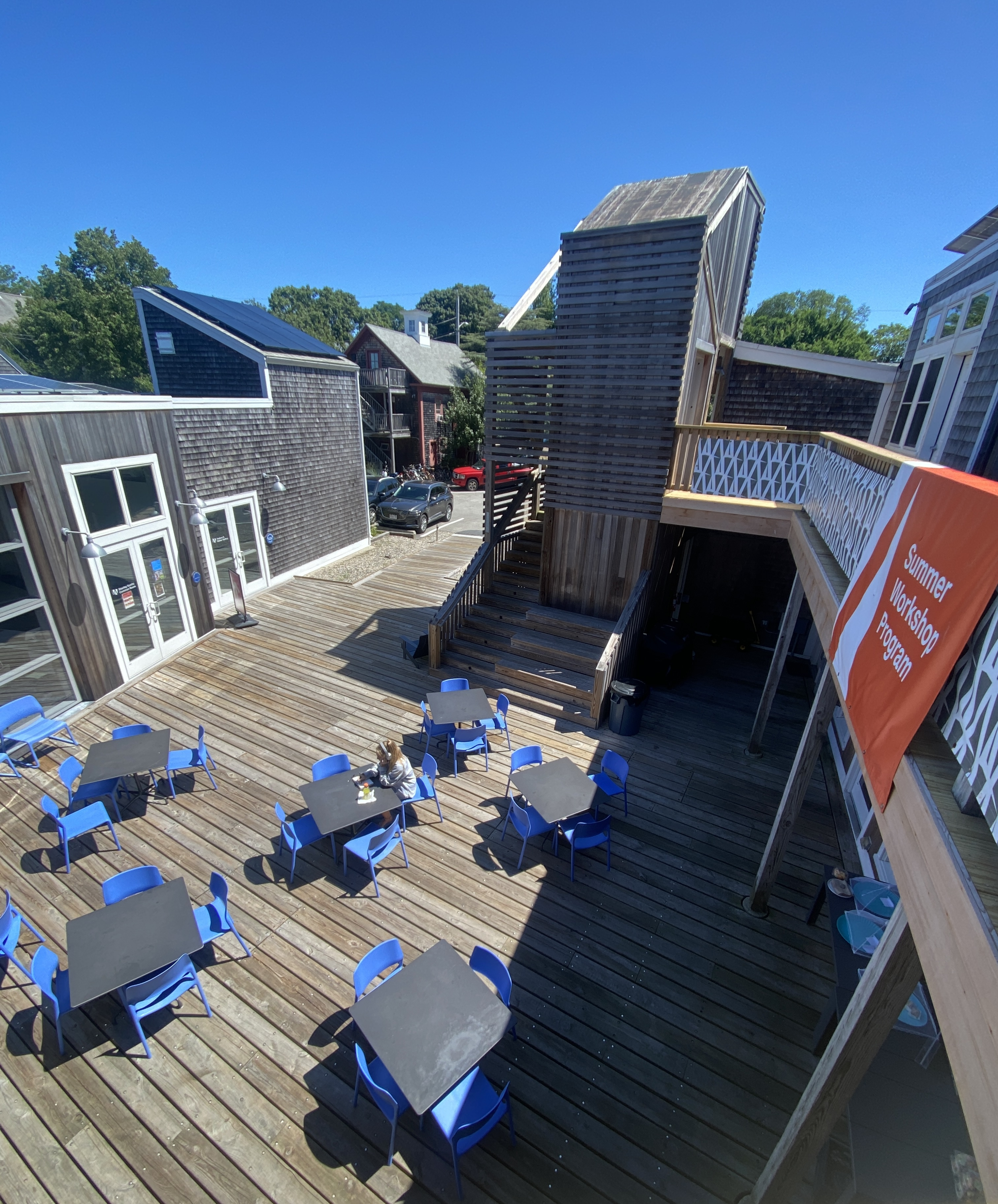
- Fine Arts Works Center's outdoor seating area.
- Formation: 1968; 58 years ago
- Type: Nonprofit
- Purpose: support the arts in Provincetown, Massachusetts
- Headquarters: Provincetown, Massachusetts
- Region served: United States
- Executive Director: Sharon Polli
- Staff: 10
- Website: http://www.fawc.org

The Fine Arts Work Center is a non-profit enterprise that supports emerging visual artists and writers in Provincetown, Massachusetts. The Work Center was founded in 1968 by a group of American artists and writers to support promising individuals in the early stages of their creative careers. Each year, it offers ten writers and ten visual artists seven-month residencies, including a work area and a monthly stipend. The Center also offers a Master of Fine Arts degree in collaboration with the Massachusetts College of Art and Design, as well as seasonal programs, readings, and other events.

== History ==
The Fine Arts Work Center was founded in 1968 by artists, writers, and patrons, including Fritz Bultman, Salvatore and Josephine Del Deo, Alan Dugan, Stanley Kunitz, Philip Malicoat, Robert Motherwell, Myron Stout, Jack Tworkov, and Hudson D. Walker.

For the Center's 50th anniversary, the managing team fundraised $1.4 million to fund architectural improvements and the organization's first endowment.

== The Fellowship Program ==
Each year the Visual Arts and Writing Committees, composed of established artists and writers, select twenty Fellows (ten visual artists and ten writers) from some 1,000 applications. Fellows are accepted on the basis of the quality of work submitted. For the seven-month period of October 1 to May 1, the selected Fellows move to Provincetown to devote their time to their work. The Fellows receive living and studio space and a modest stipend. Writing Fellows have the opportunity to publicly read from their work and visual artists are invited to exhibit in solo shows. All Fellows can publish their work online in the in-house art and literary journal Shankpainter.

Since the Work Center's founding, more than 1,000 Fellowships have been awarded. The Fine Arts Work Center awards more fellowships each year than any other program of its kind. Notable former fellows include writers Michael Cunningham, Alice Fulton, Louise Glück, Denis Johnson, Yusef Komunyakaa, Jhumpa Lahiri, Susan Mitchell and Franz Wright; and visual artists Yun-Fei Ji, Madhvi Parekh, Sam Messer and Lisa Yuskavage.

In 2010, the Center was awarded a National Endowment for the Arts Access to Artistic Excellence grant to support the Winter Fellowship program.

== Other residency programs ==
The Fine Arts Work Center offers a Returning Residency Program that encourages former Fellows to return to Provincetown by offering apartments and studios at discount rates during a number of weeks in the Spring and Fall. The Long-Term Residency Program for former Fellows extends the opportunity to live in Provincetown for up to three years at below-market rents. Five new live/work spaces at the Meadow Road development on Bradford Street are offered to former Fellows (for up to three years) who meet the affordable rental guidelines.

In collaboration with other arts organizations around the country and abroad, the Fine Arts Work Center hosts one- to three-month Collaborative Residencies in the Summer and Fall. Writers or visual artists are selected on the merit of their work by the collaborating organization. Apartments, studio space and stipends are sponsored by the collaborating organizations, which include Cave Canem, the Institute of American Indian Arts, Kundiman, and Lambda Literary.

The Ohio Arts Council, a collaborative residency partner since 1994, sends a writer and a visual artist for three months every summer. The Maryland Institute College of Art sends one visual artist each year for a two-month period. Four Way Books has sponsored one month-long residency for poets published by the press. The Copley Society of Boston, also a long-time collaborative partner, awards a one-month residency to a visual artist. The Gaea Foundation also works in collaboration with the Work Center, though its residents live off-site in a cottage on Commercial Street.

== The MFA in Visual Arts ==
Since September 2005 the Massachusetts College of Art and Design has collaborated with the Fine Arts Work Center to offer a low-residency Master of Fine Arts program in Provincetown. Candidates selected by the Boston-based MassArt study and work in Provincetown at the Center during four 24-day residencies in September and May over the course of the two-year program. They are taught and evaluated by a faculty of prominent resident and visiting artists. During the periods between the Provincetown residencies, the students, many of whom are already pursuing careers in the arts, return home to work under the guidance of approved mentors who visit their studios once a month. On-line history and academic courses support an understanding of the historical and cultural context of contemporary work, including their own. At the conclusion of the program, candidates return to the Work Center for a final two-week residency in September to present their thesis shows, participate in thesis reviews and submit their written theses.

== Public events ==
Each summer, the Fine Arts Work Center offers approximately eighty workshops focused on creative writing and the visual arts. Hundreds of students study with a faculty of master artists and writers; the workshops are week-long, extending over ten weeks from mid-June through late August. The Summer Workshop Program has been accredited by American University, Lesley University and Maine College of Art in Portland. Revenues from this program help support the Fellowships.

Since 1968 the Fine Arts Work Center has brought nationally recognized artists and writers to Provincetown for public lectures, readings and exhibitions. Readings and talks are scheduled year-round. Visiting artists and writers include Galway Kinnell, Marge Piercy, Mark Doty, Paula Vogel, Robert Pinsky, Oscar Hijuelos, Jonathan Franzen, Richard Prince, Ha Jin, Marilynne Robinson, Denis Johnson, Mark Strand, and Bill Jensen.
