= Jon Serl =

American artist (1894–1993)

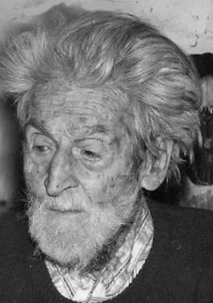
- Jon Serl, 1980
- Born: Jon Serl; November 6, 1894; Olean, New York
- Died: June 23, 1993 (aged 98); Lake Elsinore, California
- Other names: Joe Seals, Joseph Searles, Jerry Palmer, Ned Palmer
- Known for: Painting
- Notable work: BETWEEN TWO WORLDS

Jon Serl (November 6, 1894 – June 23, 1993) was an American artist. He is best remembered as a painter in the tradition of the American artists Grandma Moses and Edward Hicks. He also worked as a vaudeville artist named Slats, as a voiceover performer for Hollywood named Ned Palmer, and as a migrant fruit collector known as Jerry Palmer.

== Early life ==
Jon Serl was born as Josef Searls in 1894 in Olean, New York. He was the fifth child of seven. Serl grew up in a vaudevillian theatrical family, which contributed to his early artistic talents, including performance, acting, dancing, singing and as a female impersonator. Serl was one of his several pseudonyms: in his young adult days he worked as a peripatetic female impersonator performer known as "Slats." In the late 1920s, during the end of the silent film era, he was called Jerry Palmer with the first Sound film. He went by Ned Palmer during the Great Depression, as a migrant fruit picker. He was a voiceover artist for actors whose voices did not fit well in 'talkies'.

== Lifestyle ==
Jon Serl lived in destitute conditions. His house was dilapidated and next to his porch there was a written sign stating: "CLEAN ENOUGH TO BE HEALTHY, DIRTY ENOUGH TO BE HAPPY". Paintings were piled up everywhere while mice and chickens were found around the property. There was no radio. Serl ranked his home as a dump, in his own words: "It's a dump, but it's a nice dump". Serl traded his paintings for rent, with Florence Kochevar, the owner of the San Gabriel property.

== Career ==
Serl was a self-taught painter who started painting seriously in his mid-fifties. He wanted to buy a painting for his house in San Juan Capistrano, California, but did not have the money. As a result, he started painting and created his own paintings. During this period he also worked in vaudeville, movies, and as a docker.

Between 1945 and 1985, Jon Serl created more than 1200 paintings inspired by nature. He refused to exhibit for 20 years until he finally agreed to display his work in the 1970s; his first exhibition was held in 1970 when he was 76. The Los Angeles Municipal Art Gallery managed the exhibition entitled, "California primitives, authentic and of great importance". . At this time Serl he was settled in Lake Elsinore, a desert town in California. In 1981, the Newport Harbor Art Museum organized a show named "Psychological Paintings: The Personal Vision of Jon Serl". His work is now held in permanent collections in several museums including the Smithsonian American Art Museum and the American Folk Art Museum

=== Painting style ===
Serl painted in oil paint on a found surface. He mainly painted characters that were known to be expressionistic and complex, but also brash and bold. It was part of his trademark, which also included the long elegant arms, clownish expressions, and large eyes. Because of his vaudeville childhood, his canvases were often compared to theatrical stages. His works explored the inner and the outer worlds with a narrative that often expressed dualities such as female and male, good and evil, or nature and technology.

=== Theatrical and movie career ===
Jon Serl was born in a theatrical family. When he was a child he enjoyed performing on stage with his sister. Later, in 1937, when he was 39 he moved to Laguna Beach and began to write screenplays for Hollywood. Jon Serl was also a voiceover artist for silent film actors who could not make the transition to the talkies. When World War Two started, he left the United States and went to Canada, where he worked as a forest guard. He used his spare time to paint. After the war, he returned to the United States, settling in Laguna Beach where he worked odd jobs and spent all his spare time painting.

== Artwork ==
One of Serl's best known paintings is Between Two Worlds (1982). A central character stands in the middle wearing a blue dress with their hands twisted, face contorted, seeming in agony. The figure is wearing a dress, but is male. Surrounding the figure are faces of various shapes and colors.

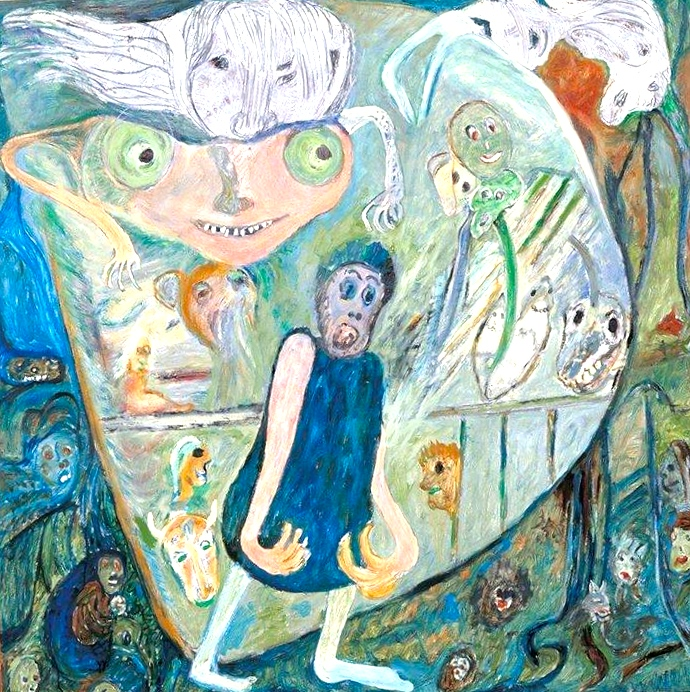
Jon Serl, Between Two Worlds, 1982

=== Solo exhibitions ===
- 2013, Jon Serl: The Mutuality of Being. Natalie and James Thompson Art Gallery, Department of Art and Art History, San Jose State University, San Jose, California
- 1994, Jon Serl: One Man By Himself, Art Alliance Gallery, Riverside Art Museum, Riverside, California
- 1981, Psychological Paintings: The Personal Vision of Jon Serl, Newport Harbor Art Museum, Newport Beach, California

=== Group exhibitions ===
- 2013, Great and Mighty Things: Outsider Art from the Sheldon and Jill Bonovitz Collection, Philadelphia Museum of Art
- 2012, Accidental Genius: Art From the Anthony Petullo Collection, Milwaukee Art Museum, Milwaukee
- 2004, Golden Blessings of Old Age, American Visionary Art Museum, Baltimore
- 1999, Aliens Among Us, American Visionary Art Museum, Baltimore
- 1986, Muffled Voices: Folk Artists in Contemporary America, PaineWebber Art Gallery & Museum of American Folk Art, New York

== Books ==
"Jon Serl: The Mutuality of Being." San Jose: Natalile and James Thompson Art Gallery, 2013 was produced in conjunction with the exhibition of the same title that took place at San Jose State University in the spring of 2013. It includes an introduction by Jo Farb Hernandez, Gallery Director and Exhibition Curator, as well as essays by Cara Zimmerman, co-editor of the 2013 book "Great and Mighty Things:" Outsider Art from the Jill and Sheldon Bonovitz Collection, and Randall Morris of the Cavin-Morris Gallery in New York, and Serl's longtime gallerist and friend. A full bio and bibliography are included, along with 71 full-color images of Serl's work and four archival photographs.

On January 1, 1995, West Stockbridge, MA: Hard Press, Inc., 1995 published "One Man by Himself: Portraits of Jon Serl by Sam Messer. Essays by Denis Johnson and Red Lips, All Handwritten Quotes from the Mouth of Jon Serl". This book includes a narrative by Denis Johnson describing the painting encounters between both artists, as well as Jon Serl's quotes.

Later on, published by Hard Press Editions with its first edition on December 25, 1995, "One Man by Himself (Profile Series)" by Sam Messer presents a total of 25 sensitive portraits of Jon Serl. From his daily habits to his thoughts, Messer's paintings show the obstinate personality of the American painter.

=== Sam Messer ===
Artist Sam Messer met Jon Serl in December 1990. At this time Serl was 96. Messer was driven to the artist because of his famous self-taught paintings; an artist himself, he wanted to learn about Serl's life and paint him. Meetings between the artists became common almost every week until Serl's death in 1993. Through these years almost fifty portraits of Jon Serl were painted and then published in the book "One Man by Himself". Messer said that Jon Serl was a role model for him. He said that Jon Serl completely regenerates his painting practice and that he was also a part of his rebirth as a person.

== Quotes ==
- "If it weren't for my painting I would have died a long time ago."
- "It is this fundamental import that is captured in the portrait. If I don't use the paint it cries."
- "They wanted fifty cents for it," Serl said. "I didn't have fifty cents, so I painted my own."
- "It's a good way to live. You get tired of living the sissy way, pushing buttons."
- "There's no TV, no radio, you have to invent for yourself."
