= The Story of My Typewriter =

2002 book by Paul Auster with pictures by Sam Messer

- First edition
- Author: Paul Auster
- Illustrator: Sam Messer
- Language: English
- Subject: Autobiography
- Publisher: Distributed Art Publishers
- Publication date: 2002
- Publication place: United States
- Media type: Print
- Pages: 63
- ISBN: 1891024329
- OCLC: 606639033
- Dewey Decimal: 813.54
- LC Class: PS3551.U77

The Story of My Typewriter is a 2002 book, by Paul Auster, mostly with pictures by the painter Sam Messer. It is about the author's old Olympia typewriter. Auster bought the typewriter in 1974 from an old college friend who had owned it since 1962. Allegedly, everything Auster has written since has been typed on it.

== Reception ==
Publishers Weekly described the book as "undeniably odd but captivating", praising both Auster's writing and Messer's artwork.
