= Mark Bulwinkle =

American graphic artist and sculptor

- Born: 1946 (age 79–80); Waltham, Massachusetts
- Education: University of Pittsburgh, San Francisco Art Institute
- Known for: Sculpture
- Movement: Funk art, Nut art

Mark Bulwinkle (born 1946, Waltham, Massachusetts) is an American graphic artist and sculptor who works in cut steel. He received a BFA from the University of Pittsburgh in 1968 and an MFA in printmaking from the San Francisco Art Institute in 1974. In 1975, he learned welding at San Francisco's John O'Connell Trade School and began working as a welder at the Bethlehem Ship Yards. He continued to work as an industrial welder until age 40, when he became a full-time artist.

Bulwinkle is considered a member of the West Coast Funk movement. Giant Fish, from 1985, is exhibited at Spalding House of the Honolulu Museum of Art. It demonstrates the wit and playful imagery of Bulwinkle's cut steel sculptures. Other works include Three Figures, which is part of the City of Portland and Multnomah County Public Art Collection and many pieces in Oakland and Berkeley in California. He lives and works in Bulwinkleland, a compound in West Oakland.

In 1997, Bulwinkle showed in "Hello Again!", a recycled art focused show which opened at the Oakland Museum and travelled throughout North America. The show, curated by Susan Subtle, featured Bulwinkle alongside Mildred Howard, Leo Sewell, Clayton Bailey, Claire Graham, Jan Yager, Remi Rubel, Pippa Garner, and others.
