= Josef Frank =

Josef Frank may refer to:

- Josef Frank (architect) (1885–1967), Austrian-Swedish architect, artist and designer
- Josef Frank (politician) (1909–1952), Czech politician

== See also ==
- Joseph Frank (disambiguation)
