= Three Figures =

Sculpture by Mark Bulwinkle in Portland, Oregon

- The sculpture in 2015
- Artist: Mark Bulwinkle
- Year: 1991–1992
- Type: Sculpture
- Medium: Bronze; steel
- Location: Portland, Oregon, United States; 45.53001°N 122.65221°W
- Owner: City of Portland and Multnomah County Public Art Collection courtesy of the Regional Arts & Culture Council

Three Figures is an outdoor sculpture by American artist Mark Bulwinkle, located at Northeast 13th Avenue and Northeast Holladay Street in Portland, Oregon's Lloyd District. The installation includes three bronze or steel figures, created during 1991–1992, each measuring between 8 feet (2.4 m) and 10 feet (3.0 m) tall. Originally installed at AVIA's corporate headquarters, the figures were donated to the City of Portland and relocated to their current location "to appear to be enjoying the green space". Three Figures is part of the City of Portland and Multnomah County Public Art Collection courtesy of the Regional Arts & Culture Council.

== See also ==
- 1992 in art
