= Myrtice West =

American artist

- Born: Myrtice Snead; September 14, 1923; Cherokee County, Alabama
- Died: April 12, 2010 (aged 86); Centre, Alabama
- Movement: Outsider art
- Website: myrticewest.com

Myrtice West (1923–2010) was an American self-taught painter. In addition, she had been born into an, "economically underprivileged background", thus, " had little chance for a formal education in the arts."

West née Snead was born in Cherokee County, Alabama, on September 14, 1923. In 1940 she married Wallace West, with whom she had one child. She started painting in the early 1950s. Over a seven-year period in the 1970s, West created a series of 14 paintings based on the Book of Revelation. These paintings message of, "good vs. evil", were in hope to inspire its audience.

Her work was included in the 1991 exhibition Outsider Artists of Alabama sponsored by the Alabama State Council on the Arts (ASCA). This brought attention and interest in her work. In 1996 her work Ezekiel Ch. 31 was included in the exhibition "The Tree of Life" at the American Visionary Art Museum. In 1999 a book about her Revelation series, entitled Wonders to Behold: The Visionary Art of Myrtice West was published by Mustang Publishing (ISBN 0914457993).

In spite of this success, she suffered from numerous tragedies. In 2005, West's home burned to ground, alongside thirteen of her paintings. Additionally, her husband of sixty-four years died from cancer, causing her health to subsequently fail. She died on April 12, 2010, in Centre, Alabama. Her paper are in the Art & Artist files at the Smithsonian American Art Museum/National Portrait Gallery Library.
