= Leo Sewell =

American artist

Leo pachuru
- Born: James Leo Sewell; 7 September 1945 (age 81); Annapolis, Maryland, United States
- Occupations: Artist, Junk Sculptor
- Years active: 1960–present

Leo Sewell (born 7 September 1945) is an American "found object" artist. His assemblages of recycled material are in over 40 museums and in private collections worldwide.

== Biography ==
Sewell was born in Annapolis, Maryland, United States and moved to Philadelphia in 1974. As a child in Annapolis, he "recalls the 'excitement of tinkering' with stuff he discovered and recovered during walks in the woods and visits to the naval-community dump."

As an adult, Sewell earned a B.A. in business and an M.A. in art history at the University of Delaware, where he wrote his master's thesis on the "Use of the Found Object in Dada and Surrealism". However, he never had formal studio training, a circumstance that places him in the visionary art category.

Sewell's art follows naturalistic themes, and animals feature prominently in his creations. His collage-like sculpture is assembled from metal, wood, and plastic that he collects from trash, yard sales, and flea markets. For some commissions, he uses objects, often of sentimental value or with personal meaning, contributed by the patron who has commissioned the art.

Sewell has produced over 4,000 works over the last 50 years. His art has been seen on children's television shows, including Captain Noah and Mr. Roger's Neighborhood, and features in the permanent collections of 23 Ripley's Believe It or Not! museums worldwide, as well as in museums such as the American Visionary Art Museum (Baltimore, Maryland), the Chicago Children's Museum (Chicago, IL), the Garbage Museum (Stratford, CT), the Museo de Sera International (Madrid, Spain), the Please Touch Museum (Philadelphia, PA), and the Shonandai Cultural Center (Fujisawa, Japan). His work is also collected by corporations including NBC and Nike, Inc, and Sewell has produced public art works for institutions, including the U.S. Environmental Protection Agency and local state environmental protection offices. In 1982, while working in Philadelphia, Sewell and his work were featured in a TV show called "You asked for it", hosted by Rich Little with a report from Leah Erickson.

In 1997, Sewell showed in "Hello Again!", a recycled art focused show which opened at the Oakland Museum and travelled throughout North America. The show, curated by Susan Subtle, featured Sewell alongside other artists Mildred Howard, Mark Bulwinkle, Clayton Bailey, Claire Graham, Jan Yager, Remi Rubel, Pippa Garner, and others.

Sewell is a member and co-founder of the artists' group called the Philadelphia Dumpster Divers.

== Bibliography ==
- Alterio, Michael Moran. "An artist creates with found objects — found at the flea market." FleaMarketZone.com: Sumner Communications (Bethel, CT) 26 Apr. 2011.
- "Artists Turn Trash to Treasure to Help Save Garbage Museum." Milford Mirror (CT) 8 Apr. 2010, News: 9A. NewsBank. Web. 14 Aug. 2010.
- Burrell, Jackie. "Candy Sculpture at San Jose’s Tech Museum." Contra Costa Times: Blogs (Walnut Creek, CA) 27 Oct. 2009, Apparently Speaking: Np. NewsBank. Web. 14 Aug. 2010.
- "Eco Arts: Sculptures Made from Found Materials Display the Beauty of Recycling." Instablogs.com 15 Oct. 2009. General OneFile. Web. 14 Aug. 2010.
- Firmin, Pam. "From Gulfport, with Junk: Sculptor Sees Art Everywhere." Sun Herald, The (Biloxi, MS) 25 April 2006, Local-Front: A2. Newspaper Source. Web. 14 Aug 2010.
- "Garbage Museum Shows Art Made from Others' Trash." Stratford Star (CT) 22 Apr. 2010, News: 11A. NewsBank. Web. 14 Aug. 2010.
- Grundahl, Nancy. "Leo Sewell's 'Found Objects' Exhibiting at EPA." Environmental Protection Agency. 5 Jan. 2004. Web. 13 August 2010.
- Jackson, Danielle. "Recycling Your American Pride." Waste Age 32.12 (2001): 50. Vocational and Career Collection. Web. 14 Aug. 2010.
- Kenny, William. "Kids Won't Hear "Hands off!' - at the Please Touch Museum." Northeast Times (Philadelphia, PA) 6 Nov. 2008: n. pag. NewsBank. Web. 14 Aug. 2010.
- McCoy, Bett Norcross. "The Art of Junk: Sculptor Scavenges Trash to Create Works of Art." Press of Atlantic City, The (NJ) 20 Jan. 2000, Lifestyle/Art: B1. NewsBank. Web. 14 Aug. 2010.
- O'Connell, Kaelin. "Philadelphia Artist Leo Sewell Is One Man Who Truly Believes that One Person's Trash Is Another's Treasure.." Gloucester County Times, The (NJ) 5 May 2007: n. pag. NewsBank. Web. 14 Aug. 2010.
- Rosenberg, Amy S. "Give Me Your Toys: A Scavenger Sculptor Hunts for the Perfect Playthings so that Lady Liberty Can Lift her Lamp beside the New Please Touch Museum." Philadelphia Inquirer, The (PA) 8 May 2007: City-D, Features magazine: E01. Newspaper Source. Web. 14 Aug. 2010.
- "Sculptures Prove One Man's Junk Can Be Art." Brattleboro Reformer (VT) 16 Aug. 2001, n. pag. NewsBank. Web. 14 Aug. 2010.
- "Trash Museum Worth a Visit Sculpture Represents Connecticut's Annual Waste per Person: Schoolchildren, Other Visitors Find Garbage Exhibitions Eye-opening." Free Lance-Star, The (Fredericksburg, VA) 19 Apr. 2009,: n. pag. NewsBank. Web. 14 Aug. 2010.
- "Visionary Arts Museum Returns to its Inspired Roots - Art Review." Sun, The (Baltimore, MD) 5 Oct. 2008, Final, Arts & Entertainment: 3E. NewsBank. Web. 14 Aug. 2010.
