= Mr. Imagination =

American artist (1948–2012)

- Born: March 30, 1948; Maywood, Illinois
- Died: May 30, 2012 (aged 64); Atlanta, Georgia

Gregory Warmack, better known as Mr. Imagination (March 30, 1948 – May 30, 2012), was an American outsider artist. He worked in a variety of forms and his work often made use of sandstone and bottlecaps and other repurposed materials.

== Biography ==
The third child in a family of nine, Warmack grew up in the Chicago area and had no formal training as an artist, though he began making art objects in his childhood. In the 1970s he made and sold art at street fairs. While in Chicago in 1978, he was shot in the stomach during a mugging and lapsed into a coma. During his hospitalization, he had a spiritual vision which he described as "very peaceful, almost as if I was traveling through history and looking at ancient civilizations." The incident spurred Warmack to renew his focus on art and broaden his scope, and shortly after he began using the name Mr. Imagination.

In the 1970s and 1980s, Mr. Imagination worked extensively in sculptures carved from industrial sandstone and incorporating thousands of bottlecaps fastened to surfaces of the sculpted objects. He used paint, wood, nails, putty, and cement, and also incorporated found objects into his work, including vintage commercial items and discarded objects such as tools, household instruments, and mirrors. Many of his works were thematically influenced by African and Egyptian masks and dress.

Mr. Imagination's first solo exhibition was assembled in 1983 at the Carl Hammer Galleries in Chicago. He lived and worked in Chicago until 2001, when he relocated to Bethlehem, Pennsylvania. There he contributed pieces to Lehigh University's campus and the Zoellner Arts Center, worked with the Bethlehem Fine Arts Commission, and hosted workshops for children. In January 2008 his home was destroyed in a fire, and shortly thereafter he moved to Atlanta, Georgia. He continued working and exhibiting in Atlanta until his death from a blood infection in 2012 at age 64.

== Works and exhibits ==
Mr. Imagination's works were exhibited in shows throughout the United States, in places such as the Dallas Museum of Art, the African American Museum in Dallas, the Halsey Gallery at the College of Charleston in Charleston, South Carolina, the William Benton Museum of Art at the University of Connecticut, and at the Society for Contemporary Craft in Pittsburgh. He was also exhibited internationally, including in Venice and Paris. Several of his pieces are part of the collection of the Smithsonian American Art Museum, and he is also exhibited at the American Visionary Art Museum, the American Folk Art Museum, and the High Museum of Art. He was commissioned to make an eleven-foot-tall rendition of a Coca-Cola bottle for the 1996 Olympics in Atlanta, a horned dinosaur in the DinoLand U.S.A. section of Disney's Animal Kingdom theme park, and decorated spaces for House of Blues venues in Orlando, Las Vegas, and Chicago. Among his other major works were a garden installation at the National Botanical Gardens, a globe piece at Ronald Reagan Washington National Airport, and a wall display for the transit building in Winston-Salem, North Carolina. Absolut Vodka commissioned a rendition of their bottle in his style.

In 2009, Mr. Imagination was commissioned to decorate city planters in Salina, Kansas, but the city council halted the project mid-completion and removed the finished exteriors with jackhammers.
