= Ho Baron =

American sculptor

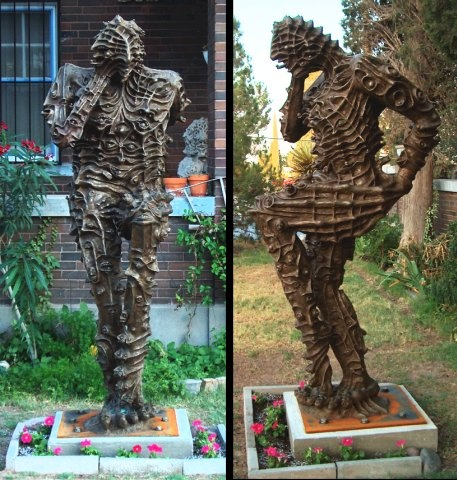
The Free Thinker

Ho Baron (B. 1941 Chicago, Ill, D. 2026 El Paso Tx) was a surrealist sculptor living and working in El Paso, Texas. His controversial pieces have been featured in shows, galleries, museums and public art installations in Arizona, California, Colorado, Illinois, Maryland, Nevada, New Hampshire, New Mexico, New York, Ohio, Oklahoma, Texas, Virginia, Washington and Mexico.

Baron creates anthropomorphic creatures from bronze and cast stone. He calls these whimsical fantastic icons "Gods for Future Religions."

== Biography ==
Born in Chicago in 1941 and raised in El Paso on the Mexican border, Baron earned a BA and MA in English, writing his Master's thesis on Joyce Cary's concept of the "artist as child," a guiding theme he still abides by. While serving in the Peace Corps in Nigeria and Ethiopia, he became intrigued with primitive, intuitive African art. Baron later lived in New York City, Philadelphia, Austin, and the Virgin Islands. In 1970, he settled in Antwerp, Belgium, working as the photographer for the art collective Ercola (Experimental Research Center of Liberal Arts) which published the underground comic Spruit.

In the late 1970s, Baron returned to the United States and studied sculpture, first at the Philadelphia College of Art and later at the University of Texas, El Paso, though he is largely self-taught and his expression is intuitive. He earned a second Master's degree in library science, and after a stint in retail, he worked part-time as a college librarian allowing him free time for his creative endeavors. A long-time proponent of the arts, he served on the City of El Paso Public Art Committee 2006-2007 and on the board of the Texas Society of Sculptors 2011–2015.

Baron as a young man was a writer. His passion to live creatively took him to the visual arts: photography, pen and ink drawing, painting and finally sculpture. He occasionally published a satirical political newspaper, The El Paso Lampoon. Baron has had photo exhibits and published a book of photos entitled El Paso: A Hoverview: 59 works. He was a radio disc jockey of a new music radio program for seven years on N.P.R. In 2007, he began creating short videos of his sculpture. He published his second book, Gods for Future Religions: Surreal Sculpture, in 2012.

Baron began sculpting in 1979 and eventually created more than 300 narrative bronze and cast stone figures. In his elder years, he turned to creating scores of sculptural assemblages. Baron's theme is of the human form, abstracting it with unique motifs of surreal imagery. Jesse Walker once wrote that his sculptures seem to have "emerged from both the deepest levels of the ocean and the deepest levels of the subconscious." Regarding the title for his collective work, Baron satirizes: "When society's tired of its existing gods, it's going to need new ones, and I'm ready."

Baron passed away on Saturday Nov 21, 2026 in El Paso Texas.

== Selected works ==
Baron's surrealistic bronze, "The Free Thinker," is on permanent display at Baltimore's American Visionary Art Museum. Baron also has pieces in the permanent collections of the Albuquerque Museum of Art and History, the Carlsbad Museum, the El Paso Museum of Art, the El Paso Museum of Archaeology, the Ellen Noël Art Museum of the Permian Basin, Keystone Heritage Park and Botanical Gardens, the Las Cruces Museum of Art, the Museum of the Southwest, the Roswell Museum and Art Center, Silver City, New Mexico and permanent public art sculptures at the El Paso Public Library, Georgetown, Texas, and Round Rock, Texas.
