= Ben Wilson (English artist) =

London street artist famous for chewing-gum

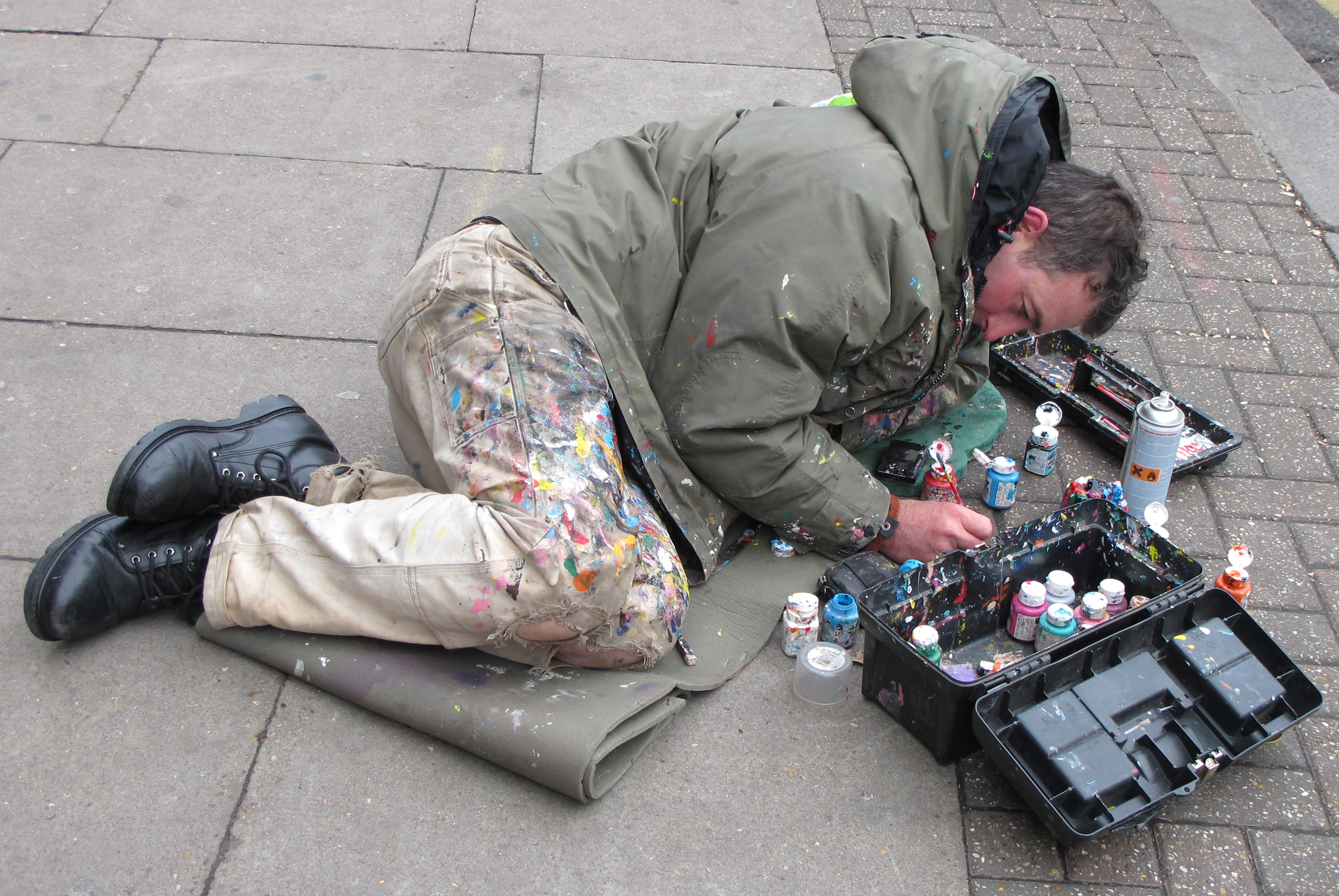
- Wilson at work in Muswell Hill Broadway
- Born: Ben Wilson; 1963 (age 62–63); Cambridge, England
- Known for: Painting, found wood sculpture
- Movement: Outsider art, pavement art

Ben Wilson (born 1963) is an English wood carver and outsider artist. The son of an artist, Wilson grew up in a creative environment and attended art school. His distaste for industrial waste, cars and rubbish eventually turned into an art form. He creates tiny works of art by painting chewing gum stuck to the pavement. Initially, his work garnered him unwanted attention from the authorities, but because he is not defacing private property but merely painting rubbish, he was found to be breaking no law. In addition to the chewing gum art, Wilson paints and sculpts. He has exhibited his paintings and sculptures in England, the United States, Germany, Ireland, Finland, France and Serbia.

== Personal details ==
Wilson was born in Cambridge and grew up in a family of artists in Barnet, in North London, England. His father is an artist who has painted, made ceramics and done performance art.

He lives in Muswell Hill with his family.

== Outsider artist ==
Wilson studied art at Middlesex University, but disliked the "overanalysing" in formal art education and dropped out. He preferred to use found wood to create sculptures, as he had done as a child.

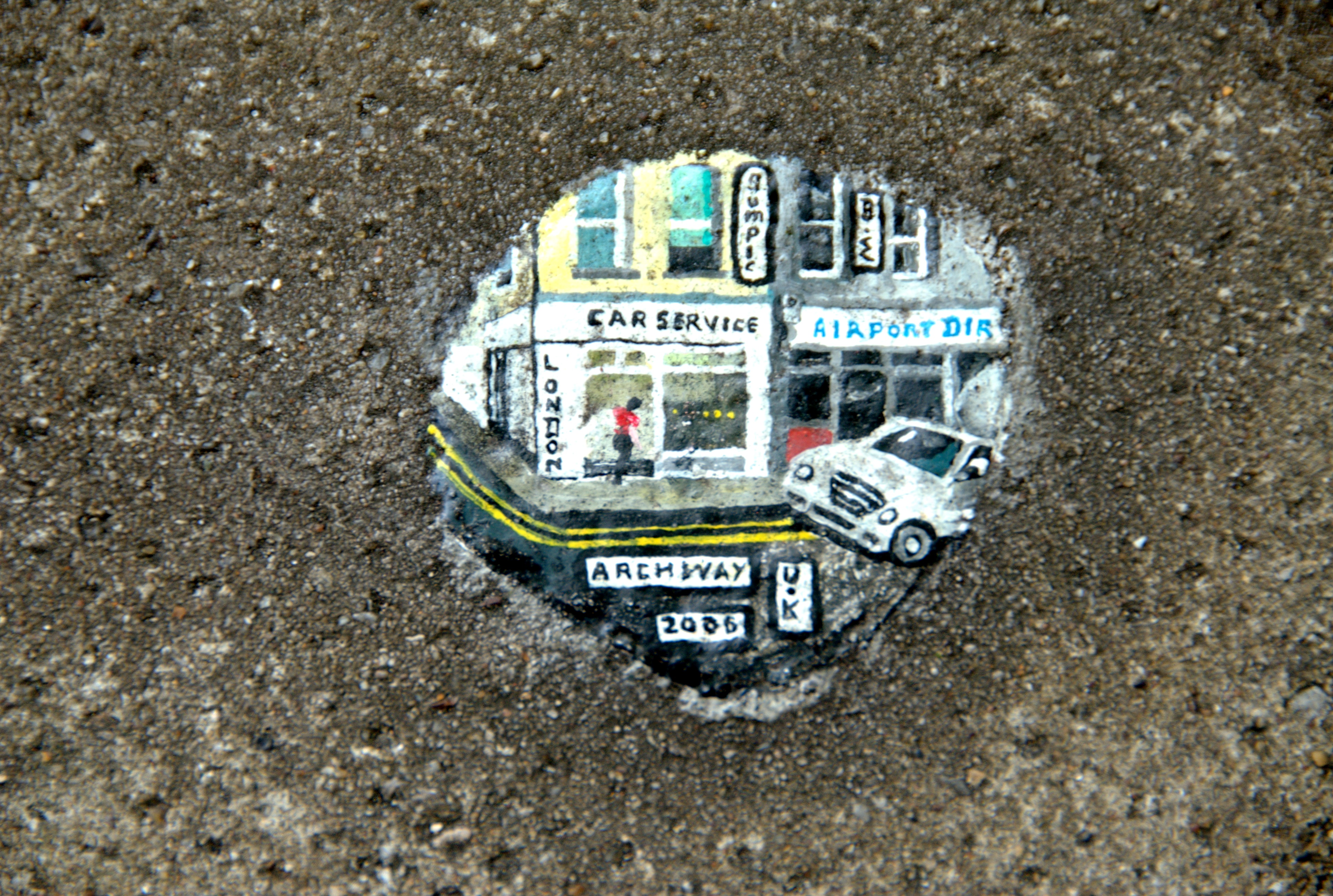
Gum painted by Ben Wilson

An artist with a strong distaste for industrial waste, cars and rubbish, Wilson took to carving sculptures in wooded areas. He would later find many of his carvings vandalized and destroyed. He had already created collages that incorporated collected bits of litter and had painted over billboards and advertisements in an effort to beautify the urban environment, an effort that brought him trouble with the law. He came on the idea of painting chewing gum, which required no gallery, bureaucracy, or permit and was not defacing property, since the gum was already discarded. He began painting gum on Barnet High Street, intending to create a trail into the centre of London.

Wilson does not confine himself to painting gum and has worked on large constructions in Finland, Australia and the United States, where he was artist-in-residence at Lehigh University in Bethlehem, Pennsylvania and created a large sculpture in Baltimore, Maryland. He also produces "normal-sized" paintings, which he occasionally sells.

Wilson has exhibited at the Contemporary Folk Art Museum in Kaustinen, Finland, the American Visionary Art Museum in Baltimore, the Lehniner Institut für Kunst und Handwerk near Berlin, the Musgrave-Kinley Outsider Art Collection at the Irish Museum of Modern Art in Dublin and La Halle Saint Pierre in Paris.

Wilson started experimenting with occasional chewing-gum paintings in 1998, and in October 2004 began working on them full-time. He has created more than 10,000 of these works on pavements all over the UK and parts of Europe, although most of his work is found in Muswell Hill.

Wilson first heats the gum with a small blow torch, then coats the gum with three layers of acrylic enamel. He uses special acrylic paints to paint his pictures, finishing each with a clear lacquer seal. The paintings take from two hours to three days to produce. Subject matter ranges from personal requests to animals, portraits or whatever whimsy pops into his head, such as "Gum Henge", a miniature painting of Stonehenge.

Britain spends £150 million annually cleaning chewing gum from pavement. Wilson was arrested in 2005 in Trafalgar Square and once in 2009. However, he says that "technically, it is not criminal damage, because you are painting the gum, not the pavement." Wilson does not consider himself to be a graffiti artist, but has come to know graffiti writers through his work.

Kids are not allowed to feel any connection with where they live ... They can't play in the streets because they are likely to get run over; then you have the national curriculum, and all this testing at school, and no opportunity to play or to make things, and everything you do outside is recorded on surveillance cameras. The only imagery that children see around them are billboards and TV; every part of their environment is out of bounds or sold off. That's why they don't care about their streets. This is a small way of connecting people.

— Ben Wilson, The Observer

Wilson has also secretly placed some 300-400 small black-and-white painted tiles at London tube stations, dated and numbered as part of a newer guerilla project, first written about in 2018.

== Community support ==
People crowd around Wilson when he works and he has been praised by passersby. He has become a local celebrity as his work has chronicled the changes in the neighborhood. He has a large book where he keeps backlogged requests for paintings, such as births and deaths, marriages or some other personal commemoration. He does not charge for gum painting requests, a word he prefers to use over "commissions". When he was arrested in 2009 by the City of London Police on suspicion of criminal damage, the case was dropped after dozens of people wrote letters of support a few months later. The Barnet police also came to his support, filing a witness statement on his behalf.

== Media attention ==
Wilson's work has been featured by the BBC, MyMuswell This Is Local London, Raw Vision, The Daily Telegraph, The New York Times and in non-anglophone countries, such as Switzerland, Germany and Serbia. Two short documentary films have also been made about Wilson, Ben Wilson, The Chewing Gum Man and In My Blood. In 2015, Ben Wilson was also featured in the Erjia Guan show.

Ben Wilson: The Chewing Gum Artist: The Millennium Bridge Gum Trail is a crowdfunded book on Wilson and his art, due to be published in November 2019.
