= Pippa Garner =

American artist (1942–2024)

- Born: Philip Garner; May 22, 1942; Evanston, Illinois, U.S.
- Died: December 30, 2024 (aged 82); Los Angeles, California, U.S.
- Known for: Drawing, performance, sculpture
- Movement: Funk art, Nut art

Pippa Garner (May 22, 1942 – December 30, 2024) was an American artist, illustrator, industrial designer, and writer known for making parody forms of consumer products and custom bicycles and automobiles. She authored The Better Living Catalog (1982) and Utopia—or Bust! Products for the Perfect World (1984) and worked as an illustrator for the Los Angeles magazine and Car & Driver for many years. Garner exhibited internationally at STARS gallery in Los Angeles, Jeffrey Stark gallery in New York, the Kunsthalle Zürich in Switzerland, and the Kunstverein Munich in Munich, amongst other institutions.

== Early life ==
Born on May 22, 1942, Garner began her career in the 1970s as a performance artist in Los Angeles.

She had been a U.S. Army combat artist in the Vietnam War, and was drafted while working at an assembly line at a car plant. Garner was assigned to the 25th Infantry, the only division with a Combat Art Team (CAT). CAT tasked soldier and civilian artists with documenting the Vietnam War in the forms of sketches, illustrations, and paintings to be collected by the U.S. Army for (in their words) "the annals of military history". This is where Garner learned to draw, and, after a trip to Japan during which she purchased a camera, take photographs. During this tour, she was exposed to the toxic chemical Agent Orange, causing her to develop leukemia later in life.

Garner went to the Automotive Design department at ArtCenter College of Design in Los Angeles after she was discharged, but was expelled after her first year. For a year-end project (circa 1969–72), she submitted, Un(tit)led (Man with Kar-Mann); a sculpture of a classic 1960s-style silver and white sedan with, in the absence of a bumper, a naked bottom half with carefully rendered penis and testicles. One human leg is lifted like a dog urinating. The work was last seen in the 1970s, and only photographs of the work exist.

== Work ==
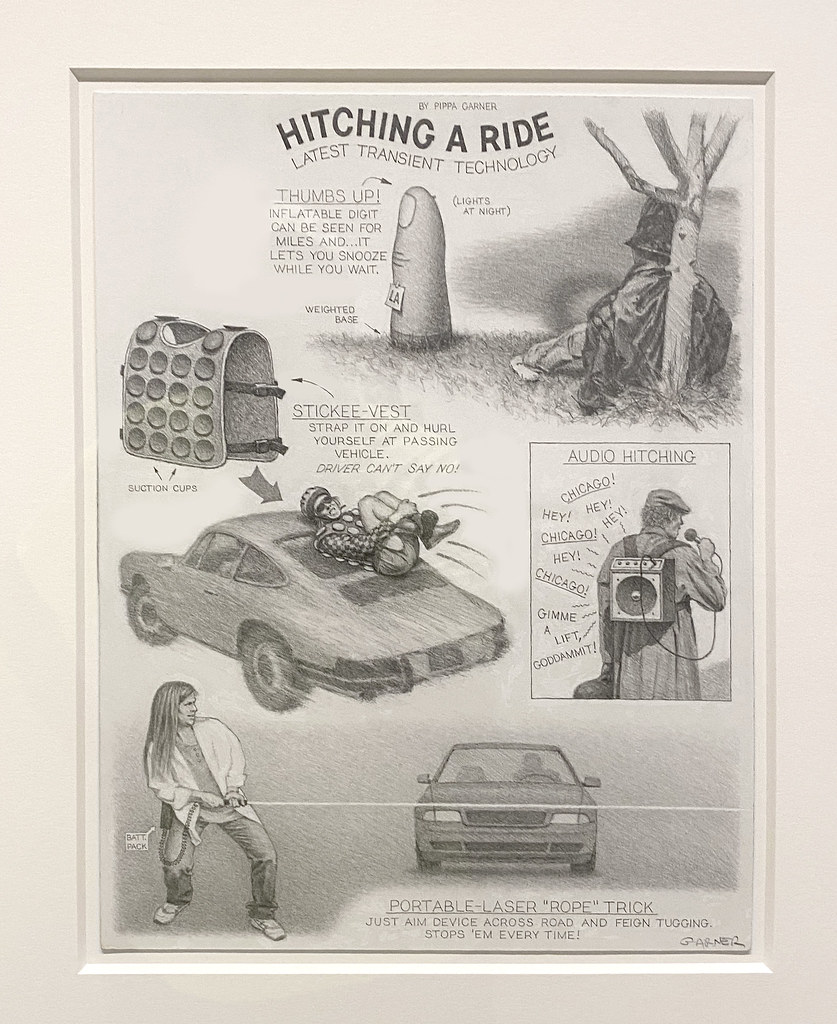
Pippa Garner, Untitled, 1995. Pencil on paper. Verge Center for the Arts.

In 1974, Garner modified a Chevrolet automobile to appear to be driving backwards while it moved forwards and vice-versa. Titled, Backwards Car, 1974, the artwork-like-invention was featured in Esquire in 1975. Garner's work has often been described as a "critique of car culture", reflecting on the US fascination with overbuilt, supersized machines. The work was noticed by San Francisco artists such as Ed Ruscha, Chris Burden, Nancy Reese, and the collective Ant Farm. Following the promotional feature of the artwork in Esquire, she began a long-term collaboration with some of these artists, especially Chip Lord of Ant Farm.

Later, she appeared on The Tonight Show Starring Johnny Carson wearing her infamous Half-Suit, 1982. Additional appearances included the Merv Griffin Show and several other talk shows where she showcased her satirical consumer product "inventions." Similar inventions and artworks were shown in publications such as Car & Driver, Rolling Stone, Arts & Architecture and Vogue.

Garner participated in Trappings, an artwork by Two Girls Working: Tiffany Ludwig and Renee Piechocki. During her interview for the project, she described her transition as a kind of artistic expression. Pippa appeared on the show Monster Garage as a guest artist.

In 1997, Garner showed in Hello Again!, a "recycled art-focused" show which opened at the Oakland Museum and travelled throughout North America. The show, curated by Susan Subtle, featured Garner alongside Mildred Howard, Leo Sewell, Clayton Bailey, Claire Graham, Jan Yager, Remi Rubel, Mark Bulwinkle, and others.

In 2010, Garner began experimenting with, in her words, the “trash medium” of T-shirts. As part of a larger project she dubbed Shirt Storm, Garner played with the T-shirt as a “format for art” and for her own critique of consumer culture and contemporary advertising. These shirts showcased Garner’s unique sense of humor, featuring ironic slogans paired with graphic symbols or racy imagery. Garner would wear these shirts herself around Santa Fe, a choice that gave her a “quick response” from her audience rather than having to wait for her pieces to end up in shows.

In 2017, Garner had a solo show at Redling Fine Art, Los Angeles where she presented sculptures, drawings, and videos.

A selected retrospective was on view at JOAN gallery in Los Angeles in November and December 2021.

=== Immaculate Misconceptions ===
Garner was known for her Immaculate Misconceptions projects that she created throughout her artistic practice. The series consists of hundreds of inventions, most of them involving repurposing household consumer products into gadgets or absurd devices. For example the ironic "Hurl-A-Burger" machine is a type of catapult designed to "promote cultural exchange" by launching fast food over international border walls.

== Transition and views on gender ==
In the 1980s, Garner began transitioning genders, which she sometimes referred to as “gender hacking”. She was unable to find a doctor who would prescribe her estrogen without a therapist’s referral, but was able to buy black market hormones in Hollywood for a number of years before eventually seeking out hormone replacement therapy (HRT) and sexual reassignment surgery in 1990. Garner disliked the idea of being too comfortable socially, finding discomfort to be a better source of creativity, and shifted her position in society throughout her life in order to preserve this sense of discomfort. Transition was part of an “art project to create disorientation in my position in society, and sort of balk any possibility of ever falling into a stereotype again.”

Garner often felt uncomfortable with the strict male-female binary. In a 2021 interview with musician and visual artist Hayden Dunham, she referred to herself as “being saddled with a gender… because the advertising, consumerism, in the background in my life, was very much gender-oriented. There were things for women and things for men… And if you didn’t feel that yourself, you felt uncomfortable.” Garner presented as both distinctly masculine and feminine at different life stages—the former in her pre-transition years, the latter in order to gain legal access to HRT —but she later chose to dress and present herself more androgynously.

Garner has been noted as a predecessor to the Kardashian beauty industrial complex and Paul Preciado’s Testo Junkie. She was interested in “the concept of sex change as a form of consumer technology” and often played on themes of gendered consumerism in her artwork. Garner’s series Future Man! shows various items of traditionally masculine business attire modified into androgynous or feminine-associated clothing: a tie becomes a segment of braided hair, a business shirt is transformed into a bodysuit.

Even objects apparently unrelated to gender influenced Garner’s thoughts on transition. Pieces like those seen in Immaculate Misconceptions involved the modification of consumer items to change their associated functions, and Garner began to feel a similar way about her body: “I looked in the mirror and thought: ‘I’m an object too. What can I do to play with my body?’ I had the opportunity to get breast implants at a reasonable price, so I went ahead and did it. I went to Brussels in 1992 and came home with a vagina.” In a note from 1995 titled “Thoughts on sex-change”, she wrote, “Sex-change is a 20th century invention just as computers, electric can openers, polyester pants, 800 numbers and the rest of it; technologies that create their own need.”

== Death ==
Garner died on December 30, 2024, following a battle with leukemia. She was 82.

== Published works ==
- Philip Garner's Better Living Catalog: 62 Absolute Necessities for Contemporary Survival, 1982 by Putnam Publishing Group
- Utopia—or Bust! Products for the Perfect World, 1984 by Putnam Publishing Group
- Garner's Gizmos & Gadgets, 1987 by Perigee Trade

== Exhibitions ==
- Pippa Garner: Act Like You Know Me, co-curated by Fiona Alison Duncan, Maurin Dietrich, Daniel Baumann, and Otto Bonnen at Kunstverein Munich (2022) and Kunsthalle Zürich (2023)

== Collections ==
Garner's work is in the collection of the Audrain Auto Museum of Rhode Island. A selection of her photographs are held in the Contemporary Art Library archives.

== See also ==
- Ant Farm
- Chip Lord
