= Fiona Alison Duncan =

Canadian-American writer and artist

- Born: London, Ontario, Canada
- Occupations: Writer; artist; curator; organizer
- Writing career
- Notable awards: Lambda Literary Award for Bisexual Literature (2020)

Fiona Alison Duncan is a Canadian–American writer, artist, curator, and organizer. Duncan's first novel, Exquisite Mariposa, was awarded a 2020 Lambda Literary Award for Bisexual Fiction and long-listed for The Golden Poppy Book Award in 2019. Duncan is the founder of Hard to Read, a literary social practice, and its spin-off, Pillow Talk. She has curated numerous international contemporary art exhibitions including Pippa Garner's first institutional exhibition in Europe at the Kunstverein München in Munich. The Pippa Garner exhibit traveled to New York and was shown at White Columns gallery in 2023.

== Early life ==
Duncan was born in London, Ontario. She later moved to Los Angeles and then to New York.

== Work ==
Duncan has published fiction, nonfiction, interviews, and poetry in numerous publications including Vogue, Artforum, New York Magazine (where she authored the viral article on normcore style), PIN-UP, Spike, Texte zur Kunst, and The White Review.

She is the founder of Hard to Read, a literary social practice of live events with media broadcasts, bookselling, publishing, and fine art exhibitions catered to women and queer history, as well as Hard To Read's softer literary spin-off, Pillow Talk.

In 2019, Duncan published her first novel, titled Exquisite Mariposa. The novel is set in Los Angeles and is a phenomenological journey at the end of a narrator's twenties. The book follows the spiraling out of social media and other Web2.0 technology, friendship, astrology, psychedelics, work, fame, and fortune. The novel won the 2020 LAMBDA Literary Prize for Bisexual Fiction.

Duncan served as a stylist for Amalia Ulman's debut feature film El Planeta.

Duncan was a recipient of a 2021 Andy Warhol Foundation Arts Writers Grant and a 2022 Canadian Women Artists’ Awards. Both awards were used to co-curate artist Pippa Garner's first institutional exhibition in Europe at the Kunstverein München in Munich, Kunsthalle Zürich in Switzerland and the Frac Lorraine in Metz, France. Duncan announced that she has begun working closely with the artist to write her biography.

== Awards and honours ==
- 2022, Canadian Women Artists’ Award recipient in Literary Arts
- 2020, Lambda Literary Award for Bisexual Fiction
- 2019, Long-listed, The Golden Poppy Book Award

== Publications ==
- Exquisite Mariposa (Soft Skull Press, 2019). ISBN 978-1-59376-578-1
- Act Like You Know Me (Bierke, 2023). ISBN 978-3-948546-11-3

== See also ==
- Social practice
- Pippa Garner
- Sarah Nicole Prickett
- Durga Chew-Bose
- Amalia Ulman
