= Joseph Frank =

Joseph or Joe Frank may refer to:

- Joseph Frank (cricketer) (1857–1940), English amateur first-class cricketer
- Joseph Frank (physician) (1771–1842), German physician
- Joseph Frank (promoter) (1900–1952), American promoter known as J.L. Frank, primarily in country music
- Joseph Frank (writer) (1918–2013), American literary scholar and Dostoevsky expert
- Joe Frank (1938–2018), American radio personality
- Joe Frank (politician) (born 1942), American lawyer and former mayor of Newport News, Virginia
- Joe Frank (American football) (1915–1981), member of the Philadelphia Eagles and Steagles

== See also ==
- Josef Frank (disambiguation)
