= Joseph Franklin (composer) =

American music producer and composer

Joseph Franklin is a composer, an artist-administrator, and writer. Known as the co-founder and long-time executive-artistic director of the Relache Ensemble, Inc., he has produced concerts and concert series’, international tours, residency programs, recordings, radio programs, and media events. He has composed musical works for mixed instrumental/vocal ensembles, film, video, theater, and dance and is the author of Settling Scores: A Life in the Margins of American Music, published by Sunstone Press. Joseph is the founder and president of Metadesign Associates, a consulting and project development entity.

== Career ==
Born and raised in Philadelphia, Joseph Franklin’s early experiences were informed by musical studies and athletic activities, both of which have been and continue to be essential aspects of his life and lifestyle. After service with the U.S. Navy, he returned to Philadelphia to study music composition and performance (percussion) at the Philadelphia Musical Academy (now the University of the Arts) and Temple University. Early studies of Jazz and musical collaboration were essential components in his artistic development and led to a variety of performance experiences throughout the Philadelphia area with small instrumental ensembles. While pursuing academic degrees he was exposed to twentieth-century music and the avant-garde, forever changing his musical outlook. In 1976 Joseph began organizing performances of “new” musical works by small ensembles and in 1977 he co-founded a performing ensemble dedicated exclusively to new performative and inter-media works, eventually becoming The Relache Ensemble) which evolved into Relache, Inc. From its inception until 1999 Joseph served as the executive artistic director of Relache. Subsequent, moves to Montana, Louisiana, and New Mexico offered a variety of opportunities to consult, teach, write and serve as executive director of Chamber Music Albuquerque.

== Concert productions – Relache series ==
- Relache at The Mandell Theater, Drexel University (Philadelphia);
- Relache at The Painted Bride Arts Center (Philadelphia);
- Relache at The Fleisher Art Collection (Philadelphia);
- Relache at The Philadelphia Museum of Art;
- Relache at The Pennsylvania Academy of Fine Arts (Philadelphia);
- Relache at The Philadelphia Ethical Society;
- Relache at The Philadelphia Arts Bank (University of the Arts);
- Relache at The Independence Seaport Museum (Philadelphia);
- Relache at The Yellow Springs Institute for Arts and Culture (Yellow Springs, Pennsylvania) in collaboration of the series “Six Saturdays”;
- Relache at The Philadelphia Freedom Festival – in conjunction with the City of Philadelphia and Bell Atlantic, Inc.;
- Relache at Merkin Concert Hall (New York, NY);
- Relache at the Wilma Theater for “Bertolt Brecht and Song” (Philadelphia);

== Festivals ==
- Relache in concert at Bang on a Can Festival (New York, NY);
- Relache in concert at the Interlink Festival, Tokyo, Japan – in conjunction with the American Embassy, Tokyo;
- Relache at the Latin American New Music Festival, Caracas, Venezuela;
- Relache in concert at the Prague Spring Festival, Prague;
- Relache in concert at the Vienna Festvolken;
- Relache in concert at New Music America, Hartford, Connecticut;
- Relache in concert at New Music America, Philadelphia;
- Relache in concert at New Music America, Miami, Florida;
- Relache in concert at the Composer to Composer Festival, Telluride, Colorado;
- New Music America 1987 Festival– Philadelphia – in collaboration with arts organizations and the City of Philadelphia, produced the seventh festival of the eleven produced in the U.S.

== Concert tours ==
Managed tours for the Relache Ensemble throughout the United States, Europe, Japan and South America;

== Partnerships and residencies ==
- The Annenberg Center for the Performing Arts, University of Pennsylvania – Co-presented a series that featured a variety of musical artists, from Jazz to New and World Music;
- Yellow Springs Institute for Contemporary Studies and the Arts – Co-produced concerts, artist residencies, lectures and related media events in support of the Institute’s mission;
- Atlantic Center for the Arts – Created and Co-Directed a six-year program named “Music in Motion,” a project to create new musical works in the context of audience development in five U.S. cities, with five chamber music ensembles in residence at twelve arts centers and music schools and 32 participating composers;

== Fundraising ==
Extensive fundraising experiences having raised operational and artistic funds from major national and local (Pennsylvania) foundations and corporations, among them The Pew Charitable Trusts, The Rockefeller Foundation, Wallace Funds, The William Penn Foundation, The National Endowment for the Arts, Pennsylvania Council on the Arts;

== Recordings produced ==
- Here and Now on Callisto Records;
- The Well on the Hat-Art label with Pauline Oliveros;
- RELÂCHE New Music Live! on Callisto Records;
- Relâche On Edge on Mode Records;
- Outcome Inevitable on O.O. Discs;
- Pick It Up on Monroe Street Music;

== Compositions (partial list) ==
- Tide Warnings an electronic score commissioned by the Tina Croll Dance Company and Dance Theater Workshop;
- Flamedance for voice, flute, and piano;
- The Silent Zero for voice & 11 instruments;
- Synthasia for clarinet, oboe & tape;
- Soliloquy from the Insanity of Mary Girard for soprano & 5 instruments;
- Monads -with text by Maralyn Lois Polak for voice, English horn, vibraphone, and electronics;
- Prelude to the Insanity of Mary Girard for soprano & 11 instruments;
- Prelude to a Vision, a tape piece for voice, flute, clarinet and electronics that served as a prelude to the play, The Insanity of Mary Girard by Lanie Robertson. Commissioned by the Trans– Atlantic Theatre Company for its performances at the Edinburgh Festival other European performances;
- Noumenal Suite for flt, oboe, vlc.;
- Double–Wing 50, On Two for voice, flute/alto flute, oboe/Eng. horn, bass;
- Double–Wing 50, On Three for voice. accordion, flute;
- Everything Going Out for flutes oboe/Eng. horn, bass;
- Everything Going Out, Again for voice, alto & baritone saxophones, piano;
- Everything Going Out, Again for voice, alto & baritone saxophones, piano;
- Callisto with text by Maralyn Lois Polak for voice and 9 instruments;
- Hay Que Meter La Puntita for voice, alto flute, and vln. vla. vlc. bass, piano;

== Other professional positions and projects ==
- Founder–performer–composer, The Improvisatory Music Project, a contemporary jazz quartet;
- Performed throughout the Philadelphia Public School System under the auspices of Young Audiences, Inc.;
- Director of music and teacher of music at the Miquon Upper School in Philadelphia;
- Music director for The Philadelphia Cup sponsored by the Cultural Affairs Council of Philadelphia;
- Music teacher at the Community College of Philadelphia;
- Faculty member at Temple University College of Music Preparatory and Extension
- Guest lecturer at the Graduate School of Business Administration, Drexel University;
- Developed courses and taught in the Arts Administration program at the University of New Orleans;
- Co-founder, The Latin American Composers Project, in collaboration with the Association of Latin American Musicians (Philadelphia);
- Co-founder, The Asian-American Youth Project (Philadelphia);
- Commissioned over 250 new works for the Relache Ensemble from leading and emerging American composers;
- Founder and president of Metadesign Associates, Inc, a consulting entity;

== Awards and recognition ==
- Fellowship from The Asian Cultural Council (NYC and Tokyo) for travel and a three-month residency in Japan and Singapore;
- Fellowship from The English-Speaking Union of Philadelphia for travel and a residency in Great Britain;
- Creative Artistry Award, Philadelphia Music Alliance;
- Five Meet The Composer grants (New York, NY);
- Two Artists Fellowships in Composition from the PA Council on the Arts;

== Writings ==
- Settling Scores: A Life in the Margins of American Music. Published by Sunstone Press (Santa Fe, New Mexico)
- Book Reviews for The Philadelphia Inquirer
- Articles for the Broad Street Review (Philadelphia)
- Kyle Gann, Music Downtown – Writings from the Village Voice, page 90
- John Schaefer, New Sounds – A Listener's Guide to New Music, page 110

== Professional memberships ==
- Broadcast Music, Inc. (BMI)
- American Music Center
- American Composers Forum
- Former board member, The New Music Alliance
- Former member, board of directors, Greater Philadelphia Cultural Alliance
- Former board member, Asociacion De Musicos Latino Americanos (AMLA)
- Association of Performing Arts Presenters
- Western States Arts Federation
- Western Jazz Presenters
- Chamber Music America
- New Mexico Presenters Alliance
