= Maralyn Lois Polak =

American writer

- Born: Long Branch, New Jersey, U.S.
- Occupations: Columnist; author; screenwriter; poet; editor; researcher

Maralyn Lois Polak is an American columnist, screenwriter, performance poet, documentarian, spoken word artist, novelist and journalist.

== Career ==
In collaboration with architect Benjamin Nia, Polak co-created the 25-minute documentary My Hometown: Preservation or Development? about the threatened demolition of 19th century buildings near Philadelphia's historic Rittenhouse Square, and preservationists' efforts to save them from a developer's wrecking ball.

Her journalistic career also includes a long stint with the mainstream media as nationally syndicated weekly celebrity interview columnist for Knight Ridder and the now-defunct Sunday Magazine of The Philadelphia Inquirer, where she did over a thousand columns.

Polak was a commentary columnist for the online news site WorldNetDaily.

Polak wrote The Writer as Celebrity: Intimate Interviews in 1986. The book contains interviews with a variety of authors and journalists.

Polak authored the experimental online meta-novel, IMAGINARY PLAYMATES/Man in Her Mind: Further Adventures of Boris and Natasha, serialized weekly for six months on the former political-literary website FemmeSoul.Com, and a cartoon book, Anoushka on Her Deathbed: 101 Cartoons From the Abyss.

Polak's reviews, essays and opinion editorials have appeared in the Chicago Tribune and The New York Times.
