= Kim Alsbrooks =

American artist

Kim Alsbrooks is a Philadelphia-based artist. She was born in Charleston, South Carolina, United States, in 1961, and lived briefly in Philadelphia during the 1990s. After living in Arizona for 10 years and in Charleston, South Carolina, she returned to Philadelphia in 2007. She has had a number of solo exhibitions, and has recently received considerable attention for her White Trash Family series, which includes over 600 miniatures painted on discarded trash. She is one of the winners of the West Prize.

== Education ==
- 1996: Apprenticeship, The Fabric Workshop and Museum, Philadelphia, PA
- 1988–1989: University of Southern Illinois, Carbondale, IL: Graduate studies in printmaking
- 1986: University of Arizona, Tucson, AZ: BFA
- 1981–1983: College of Charleston, Charleston, SC: Fine Arts

== Career ==
External videos
- "There is a danger in overthinking and over verbalizing", Kim Alsbrooks, Statement: Making Art Philadelphia by Jesse Brass

Kim is currently self-employed, primarily contracted by the Mural Arts Program in Philadelphia as an artist. In Charleston, she worked in historic restoration; she is currently the owner of Luxe Painting & Historic Restoration in Philadelphia.

=== White Trash Series ===
Alsbrook's White Trash series challenges perceptions of the history of the American Civil War and associated class distinctions, by creating miniature portraits of 18th century historical figures in graphite and oil paints on a base of discarded pieces of trash. Her work was sparked in part by an interest in the tradition of miniature paintings on ivory, and also by the commentary about the historical biases in art by a friend who is a women's history professor. She began developing the series in 2004, while living in Charleston, South Carolina, producing over 600 paintings in the course of ten years. So far, her work has been featured in publications such as the Huffington Post Arts, Art Nerd, and Hi Fructose and is displayed in galleries around the United States.

Alsbrooks creates miniature portraits by creating an oval shape that is coated with gesso on trash. Then, she draws the image on the gesso in graphite and paints it in oils before Varnishing it. She says of the process of finding materials, "The trash is found flat, on the street. One cannot flatten the trash. It just doesn't work. It must be found so that there are no wrinkles in the middle and the graphic should be well centered. Then, the portraits are found that are complimentary to the particular trash." One of her favorite times to pick up trash is after the yearly Philadelphia Mummers Parade.

=== Exhibitions ===
- 2015–16 Lost and Found: Kim Alsbrooks and Nikki Couppee, Racine Art Museum, Racine, WI.
- 2015 The Bigger Picture with Mary Dewitt, Jim Doherty, and Elise Dodeles, Paul Robeson Center for the Arts, Princeton
- 2014 Last Memories: The End of My White Trash Paintings, Snyderman-Works Gallery, Philadelphia, PA
- 2013 Portraying Kinship: Work by Kim Alsbrooks and Helen Mirkil, Painted Bride at Center, Philadelphia, PA
- 2012 Recovered Delights: The Inventive World of Found Object Sculpture, group exhibition, Snyderman-Works Gallery, Philadelphia, PA
- 2010 White Trash, Bambi Gallery, Philadelphia, PA
- 2010 About Face, with Tilo Uischer (Germany) and Elisabeth Belliveau (Canada) at Two Window Project, Berlin, Germany
- 2008 Kim Alsbrooks, with Patrick Farell, Third Boat Gallery, Philadelphia, PA
- 2005 Splendour and Elegance, Lime Blue, Charleston, SC

=== Fairmount Park Map ===
In 2014, Kim published a small artisan map of Philadelphia's Fairmount Park, reflecting her own years of exploring the park on foot and by bicycle.

== Awards ==
- West Prize, 2012
