= Hipkiss (artist) =

British artist duo (born 1964)

- Born: Christopher & Alpha Mason; 1964/1964; London/Widnes (UK)
- Known for: Drawing
- Movement: Contemporary
- Awards: Pollock-Krasner Foundation 2001, 2007, 2014, 2020
- Website: www.hipkissart.com

Hipkiss (formerly known as Chris Hipkiss) is a British artist duo known for detailed figurative drawings, created using a mixed media technique that combines pencil, silver ink and metal leaf. The name is a pseudonym of married couple, Alpha and Christopher Mason.

== Life and work ==
Christopher and Alpha met in London in the early 1980s and began working together shortly afterwards. They have lived in the south of France since 2001.

In a 2012 review, Paul Hobson, director of the Contemporary Art Society, noted that the works "... share something approximate with Paul Noble’s vast panoramic vista of fantastical civilisations...".

Natural themes dominate the artists' output, and in recent years, their work has developed into a more focused treatment of the subjects. In a review of the 2018 solo exhibition, Bulwark, at the Drawing Center, Matthew Weinstein of Artforum wrote:

"Naturalists such as John J. Audubon, Karl Blossfeldt, and Pierre-Joseph Redouté treated their subjects as specimens, which necessitated the death of the object of investigation. Countless living things have been sacrificed for curiosity and representation. Hipkiss, however, use a precise kind of inner observation in the service of creation. Representation, for them, does not involve killing. Every Bulwark is a tower of celebration devoted to the protection of life."

Notable solo shows include the Drawing Center and John Michael Kohler Arts Center. The duo has also featured in exhibitions at the Irish Museum of Modern Art, Tate Britain, Whitechapel Gallery, New Museum, La Maison Rouge, Aldrich Contemporary Art Museum, David Zwirner Gallery and me Collectors Room Berlin, and can be found in the collections of the Metropolitan Museum of Art, Museum Boijmans van Beuningen, Kupferstichkabinett Berlin, FRAC (Fonds régional d'art contemporain) Picardie, Les Abattoirs and Whitworth Art Gallery.

== Name and classification ==
Historically, the work of Hipkiss was credited to Christopher alone. In 2011, the artists first publicly declared that they have always worked together, dropping the ‘Chris’ from their dual pseudonym in 2015 with retroactive effect.

The artists were offered an assignment to write an article about themselves for Raw Vision magazine during their first exhibition in a small contemporary art gallery in London in 1992. They claim to have had no prior familiarity with the genres the publication covered, and only reluctantly accepted the term ‘visionary’ for several years following the article's appearance; however, they have been consistently outspoken in their rejection of the controversial label ‘outsider’ art, which they describe as a biographically determined denomination whose criteria they do not fulfil. It is further noted that auction houses such as Christie's have mistakenly classified them as such in recent times, creating a potential source of confusion.
