= American Visionary Art Museum =

Art museum in Baltimore, Maryland, US

Coordinates: 39°16′49″N 76°36′25″W

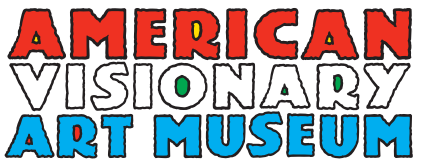

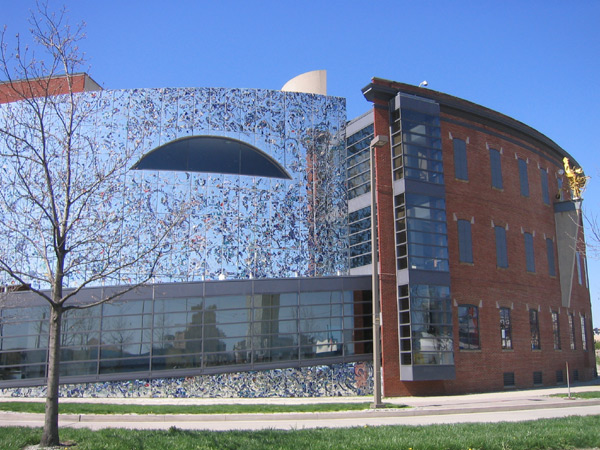
- Established: November 24, 1995; 30 years ago
- Location: Baltimore, Maryland, US
- Type: Art museum
- Visitors: Over 100,000 annually
- Director: Ellen M. Owens
- Website: http://avam.org/

The American Visionary Art Museum (AVAM) is an art museum located in Baltimore, Maryland's Federal Hill neighborhood at 800 Key Highway. The museum specializes in the preservation and display of outsider art (also known as "intuitive art," "raw art," or "art brut"). The city agreed to give the museum a piece of land on the south shore of the Inner Harbor under the condition that its organizers would clean up residual pollution from a copper paint factory and a whiskey warehouse that formerly occupied the site. It has been designated by Congress as America's national museum for visionary art.

AVAM's 1.1 acre campus contains 67,000 square feet of exhibition space and a permanent collection of approximately 4,000 pieces. The permanent collection includes works by visionary artists like Ho Baron, Nek Chand, Howard Finster, Vanessa German, Mr. Imagination (a.k.a. Gregory Warmack), Leonard Knight, William Kurelek, Leo Sewell, Judith Scott, Ben Wilson, as well as over 40 pieces from the Cabaret Mechanical Theatre of London. AVAM artists, the museum boasts, include “farmers, housewives, mechanics, the disabled, the homeless. . . all inspired by the fire within.” The museum's Main Building features three floors of exhibition space, and the campus includes a Tall Sculpture Barn and Wildflower Garden, along with large exhibition and event spaces in the Jim Rouse Visionary Center.

The museum has no staff curators, preferring to use guest curators for its shows. Rather than focusing shows on specific artists or styles, it sponsors themed exhibitions with titles such as Wind in Your Hair and High on Life. The museum's founder, Rebecca Alban Hoffberger, takes pride in the fact that AVAM is "pretty un-museumy".

== History ==
The founder and director of the AVAM is Rebecca Alban Hoffberger, who while working in the development department of Sinai Hospital's (Baltimore) People Encouraging People (a program geared toward aiding psychiatric patients in their return to the community) began to develop the idea for a visionary museum, an idea that eventually blossomed into the American Visionary Art Museum, or AVAM. Initially, Hoffberger was simply interested in the artwork created by the patients in the People Encouraging People program, and found herself “impressed with their imagination” and looking to “their strengths, not their illnesses.”

Hoffberger found inspiration on a visit to the Collection de l'art brut in Lausanne, Switzerland, which was established by French artist Jean Dubuffet as a collection of “l'art brut” or “raw art because of the untamed emotions resonating in it.” Hoffberger described the museum as “the best, the most imaginative, the most original museum” and soon adopted the idea of “l'art brut” for her own visionary museum.

In 1987, Hoffberger and Baltimore curator George Ciscle held an exhibit titled “American Outsider Art" in Ciscle's 1006 Morton St. gallery, at which point she formally announced her plans for the American Visionary Art Museum. Her then-husband, LeRoy Hoffberger, a Baltimore lawyer, businessman, and AVAM co-founder, sold items from his collection of German Expressionist art to fund the museum. With the support of her friends and family, Hoffberger petitioned the city of Baltimore and was awarded two buildings near the city's Inner Harbor worth $1.1 million. The State of Maryland issued $1.3 million in bonds to finance the construction. Hoffberger also relied heavily on contributions and donations, raising $7 million in six years from donors such as Anita Roddick. Designed by architects Rebecca Swanston and Alex Castro, the museum officially opened to the public on November 24, 1995. Davis, Bowen & Friedel, Inc., represented by Michael Wigley, AIA, served as Project Architects. Visionary artists Gerald Hawkes and Vollis Simpson were the first people to step through the doors.

In collaboration with the event's founder, Hobart Brown, AVAM brought the Kinetic Sculpture Race to the East coast in 1999 as an annual event. In 2004 the museum opened its third building, the Jim Rouse Visionary Center, converted from a former whiskey warehouse. The Jim Rouse Visionary Center houses such items as Kinetic Sculptures from AVAM's annual race, Baltimore painted screens, Leonard Knight's “Love Balloon,” DeVon Smith's “World’s First Robot Family,” and an interactive display of automata from London's Cabaret Mechanical Theatre. It also features two classrooms and a 3rd floor banquet room that can accommodate up to 400 people for the museum's programs & engagements, as well as private rentals.

In 2005, AVAM began its popular “Flicks from the Hill” series with generous support from the Hughes family. Each summer, the free, outdoor family film series features a selection of movies inspired by the museum's current thematic exhibition. The films are projected on a large screen mounted below artist Adam Kurtzman's “Giant Golden Hand” in “The Hughes Family Outdoor Theater,” and the natural amphitheater of Federal Hill can seat more than 1000 visitors for this popular outdoor film series.

The museum's many other programs include a summer arts camp and after-school program, established in 2009. AVAM is also a popular venue for weddings, hosting over 70 weddings annually. Rental/admission fees accounted for 72% of earned income in 2011, nearly three times the average for an art museum. AVAM is seeking to raise a $25 million endowment before “exploring the many offers to establish a West coast branch.”

== Mission ==
Hoffberger has said that “a good museum does more than just have objects that stand there on pedestals. The great ones are all muse-based, connecting viewers to the heart of inspiration.” AVAM's educational goals are another example of the museum's unorthodoxy. They are:

- Expand the definition of a worthwhile life
- Engender respect for and delight in the gift of others
- Increase awareness of the wide variety of choices available in life for all ... particularly students
- Encourage each individual to build upon his or her own special knowledge and inner strengths
- Promote the use of innate intelligence, intuition, self-exploration and creative self-reliance
- Confirm the great hunger for finding out just what each of us can do best, in our own voice, at any age.
- Empower the individual to choose to do that something really, really well.

These same goals were adopted by The Lower East Side Girls Club when it was founded in 1996.

== Reception ==
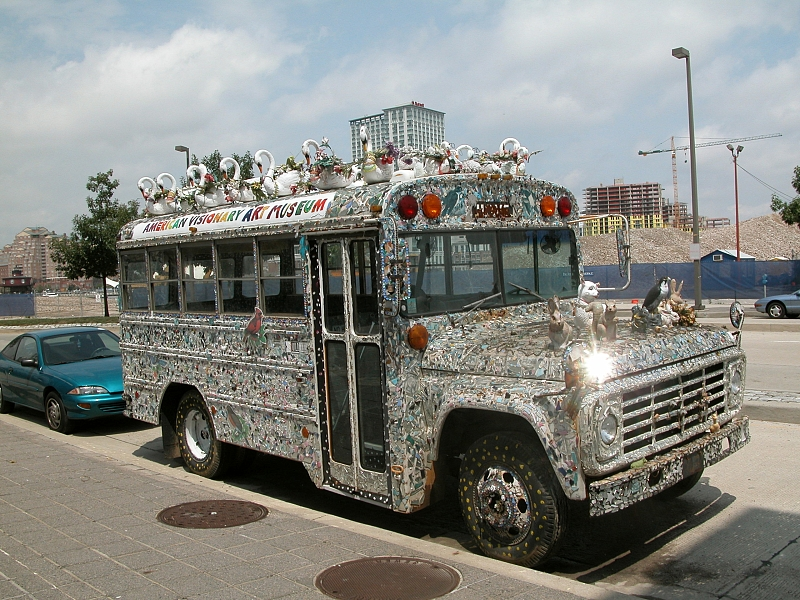
The art car

At the time of the museum's 1995 opening, it had been reported that Hoffberger's rejection of academic scholarship and her refusal to follow tradition perhaps had upset prominent members of the art world. Despite this, the museum won the support of collectors, critics, and the public through its exhibitions that examine the relationship of art to the human condition rather than to the canon of art history. In her inaugural address, Hoffberger stated that “the American Visionary Art Museum opens its doors of perception not in an effort to make war on academic or institutionalized learning, but to create a place where the best of self-taught, intuitive contributions of all kinds will be duly recognized, explored, and then championed in a clear strong voice.” Since its designation—by a unanimous vote of the U.S. Congress—as America's "official national education center, repository and museum for self-taught, intuitive artistry," the museum has produced 18 thematic "mega-exhibitions" (as of 2012); added The Jim Rouse Visionary Center (in 2004) which more than doubled its exhibition space and provided an expansive, permanent home to its education department; and added new features to the Baltimore cultural landscape (including the Hughes Family Outdoor Theater, the LeRoy Hoffberger Speaker's Corner, and more). AVAM's Flicks from the Hill Outdoor Movie Series was included in Travel + Leisure magazine's list of "World's Best Free Stuff." Further, the magazine also cited AVAM as one of the "10 Places to See Before You're 10."

== Community involvement ==
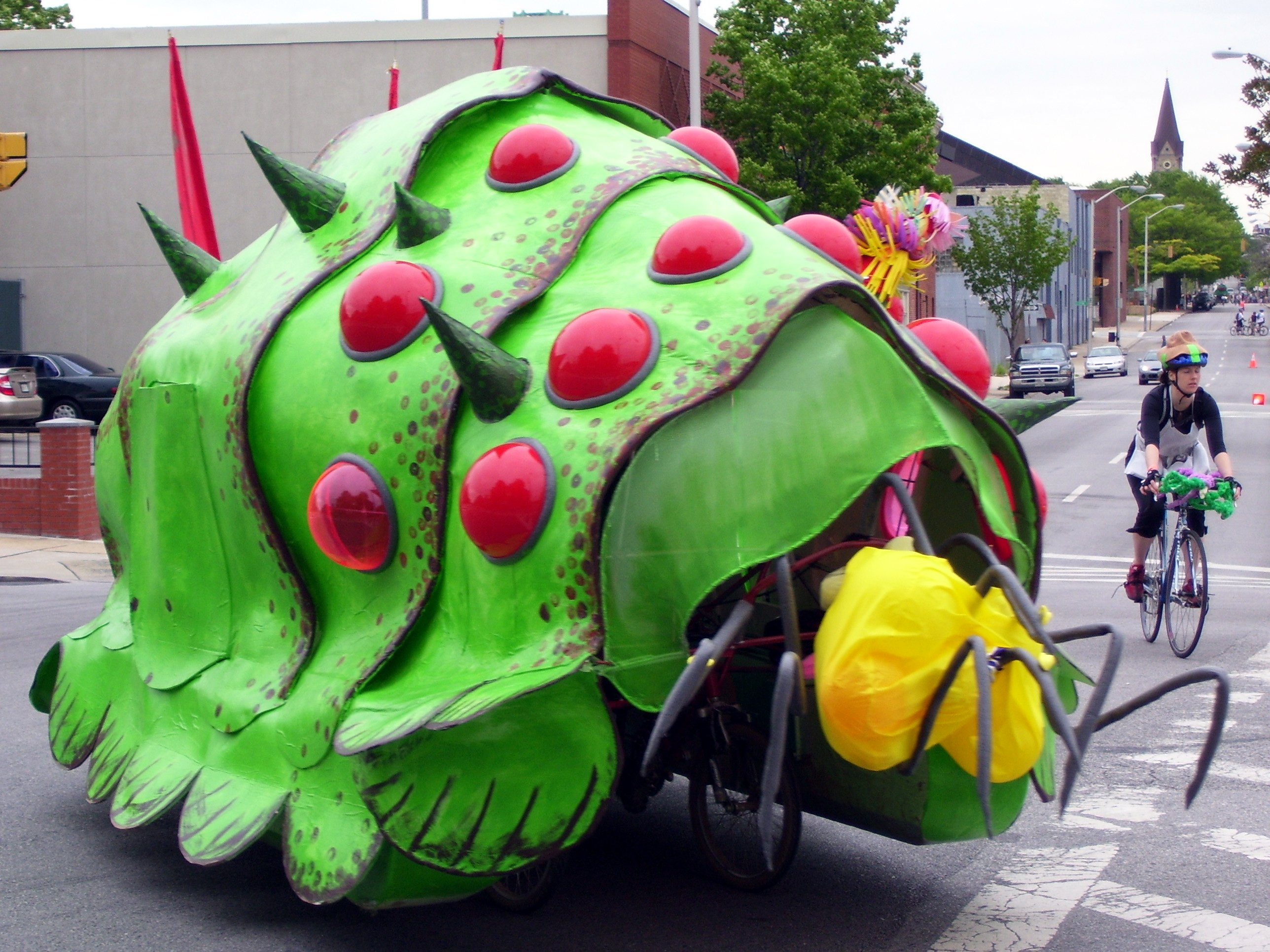
The Attack of the Sculpturians, was a human-powered vehicle, participating in the American Visionary Art Museum's Kinetic Sculpture Race, Baltimore, Maryland.

AVAM has a long history of programs and practices intended to better the community. In 1997, several of AVAM's few full-time employees were hired directly from local homeless shelters. The murals which constitute the Museum's exterior walls were created and installed by members of AVAM's youth-at-risk and youth-incarcerated mosaic apprenticeship program in 2000. AVAM sponsors Baltimore artistic events, including art car events and the annual East Coast Championship Kinetic Sculpture Race. In 2010, AVAM started an After School program in collaboration with nearby Federal Hill Preparatory School, giving students access to the museum's collections and art workshop offerings. In October 2012, some pieces made by these students were auctioned off to benefit the Children's Home in Catonsville. AVAM expanded the program to a series of free workshops, called The Institute for Visionary Explorers, in the Enoch Pratt Free Library in 2012. AVAM was also the site of the inaugural Steps for the Cure, a breast cancer awareness event and fundraiser.

== Exhibitions ==
As of 2015, AVAM has hosted 20 annual "mega-exhibitions," in keeping with the 7 tenets of the museum's “Sure-Fire Recipe for Enchantment."

=== Main thematic exhibitions ===
- Tree of Life • November 1995 – May 1996
- Wind in My Hair • May 1996 – May 1997
- The End is Near! • May 1997 – May 1998
- Love: Error and Eros • May 16, 1998 – May 30, 1999
- We are Not Alone - Angels and Other Aliens • October 2, 1999 – September 3, 2000 • Curated by Susan Subtle
- Treasures of the Soul: Who is Rich? • October 7, 2000 – September 2, 2001
- The Art of War and Peace—October 6, 2001 – September 1, 2002
- High on Life • October 5, 2002 – September 1, 2003
- Golden Blessings of Old Age & Out of the Mouths of Babes • October 4, 2003 – September 5, 2004
- HolyH20: Fluid Universe • October 2, 2004 – September 4, 2005
- Race, Class, Gender ≠ Character • October 1, 2005 – September 3, 2006
- Home & Beast • October 7, 2006 – September 2, 2007
- All Faiths Beautiful • October 6, 2007 – August 31, 2008
- The Marriage of Art, Science and Philosophy • October 4, 2008 – September 6, 2009
- Life, Liberty & the Pursuit of Happiness • October 3, 2009 – September 5, 2010
- What Makes Us Smile? • October 9, 2010 – September 4, 2011
- All Things Round: Galaxies, Eyeballs & Karma • October 7, 2011 – September 2, 2012
- The Art of Storytelling: Lies, Enchantment, Humor, and Truth • October 6, 2012 – September 1, 2013
- Human, Soul & Machine: The Coming Singularity! • October 5, 2013 – August 31, 2014
- The Visionary Experience: Saint Francis to Finster • October 4, 2014 – August 30, 2015
- The Big Hope Show • October 3, 2015 – September 4, 2016

=== Single gallery and special exhibitions ===
- Out of this World: Centennial Celebration of Eugene Von Bruenchenhein • March 2, 2010 – March 2, 2012
- Gretchen Feldman: Love Letter To Earth (1934-2008) • April 2012 – June 2013
- A Very Visionary Star-Spangled Sidewalk • Ongoing, opened Summer 2013
- Frank Bruno: A Life Devoted to The End. • July 9, 2013 – February 2, 2014
- Donald Pass: The Hope We Seek • February 28, 2014 – March 1, 2015
- Heaven's Carousel by Tim Otto Roth – Celebrating The Hubble Space Telescope's 25th Anniversary (outdoors) • April 24, 2015 – May 2, 2015
- Mr. Eddy Lives! • April 11, 2015 – April 2016
