= Sam Messer =

American painter

Sam Messer (born NYC 1955), is a painter living in Brooklyn, New York with his wife, a novelist and film writer and director Eleanor Gaver. He is Professor Emeritus at the Yale School of Art.

Messer first began showing in the 1980’s and is known for his thickly expressionistic paintings. He is also known for his constant drawing of all people he meets. He has collaborated with writers such as Denis Johnson, Paul Auster , Jonathan Safran-Foer,Sharon Olds and Eleanor Gaver. He painted numerous paintings of the author Paul Auster's typewriter some included in their book (The Story of My Typewriter). He is also known for his portraits of the artist Jon Serl (1894-1993) and the book of some of the portraits , One Man by Himself. The film , NO SEATBELTS by Gaver is a documentary of their friendship.

Messer's animation titled Denis the Pirate was featured in a Matrix Gallery exhibit in the Fall of 2017 at the Wadsworth Atheneum in Hartford, Connecticut. and the New York film festival 2017.

he is a recipient of a Guggenheim Fellowship, Pollock-Krasner award, Tiffany Foundation Award, Schowhegan residency and Provincetown Fine Arts residency where he first collaborated with Denis Johnson on Red Darkness -in 1981His work is in many public collections including MOMA, The Whitney Museum, the Metropolitan Museum , Museum of Fine Art Houston , The Tamayo Museum .

He served as Associate Dean for Yale School of Art 2005-2019 and as Director of Yale Norfolk Summer School of Art 1999-2018
