= Virginia Commonwealth University School of the Arts =

Art school in Richmond, Virginia, US

- Other names: VCU School of the Arts; VCUarts
- Former name: RPI School of Art
- Type: Public art school
- Established: 1928
- Founder: Theresa Pollak
- Parent institution: Virginia Commonwealth University
- Dean: Carmenita D. Higginbotham
- Academic staff: 227
- Students: 2,885
- Undergraduates: 2,705
- Postgraduates: 180
- Location: Richmond, Virginia, United States; 37.55°N 77.45°W
- Campus: Urban
- Website: arts.vcu.edu

The Virginia Commonwealth University School of the Arts (abbreviated as VCU Arts) is the arts school of Virginia Commonwealth University, a public university in Richmond, Virginia, United States.

The school has 18 bachelor's degree programs and six master's degree programs. Its satellite campus in Doha, Qatar, VCUarts Qatar, offers five bachelor's degrees and one master's degree. It was the first off-site campus to open in Education City by an American university.

Founded in 1928 as a single painting class by artist Theresa Pollak, VCUarts became the official art school of the university in 1933. VCUarts has been ranked in the top four art schools in the United States by U.S. News & World Report since at least 2008.

== History ==
=== Founding (1928–1935) ===
VCUarts was started as part of Richmond Professional Institute (RPI), the historical predecessor to Virginia Commonwealth University, as the "School of Art" in 1928. Initially, the school relied on private donations and the solitary work of its first teacher Theresa Pollak for funding and admissions.

According to Henry Horace "H.H." Hibbs, the first director of RPI, the catalyst for the school's establishment as a formal institute of art and design was an inaugural gift of $1,000 from Colonel A.A. Anderson, a New York portrait-painter, designer, and conservationist. In 1928, a board of private citizens (later to be known as the RPI Foundation) purchased for $7,500 a disused brick and concrete stable on Shafer Street; earlier that same year, Anderson—who traveled much of his life—purchased 900 acres of land where Richmond International Airport stands today. Hibbs, learning of Anderson's career as a painter and philanthropist, appealed to the Colonel while he was in Richmond by informing him of the board's acquisition of the stable and their intention to convert the loft on the property into the school's first art studio. Immediately interested, Anderson offered his $1,000 gift. Additional contributions by the citizens of Richmond totalling $24,000 allowed the school to open for classes by September.

Two years prior, artist Theresa Pollak had returned to her home in Richmond after four years studying in the New York Art Students' League. Hibbs also approached Pollak, proposing her a position as an hourly drawing and painting teacher. According to Hibbs' History of RPI, her lack of salary pay was allegedly a common practice in music schools of the time.

Restricted by a small working budget, Hibbs explained to Pollak that for her to begin classes, she would have to corral her own students. Before the school's first semester in the fall of 1928, Pollak "was on the telephone every day contacting everyone I knew who evinced even the slightest interest in art"; within the first year, she was able to enroll eight full-time students and nearly 30 on a part-time basis.

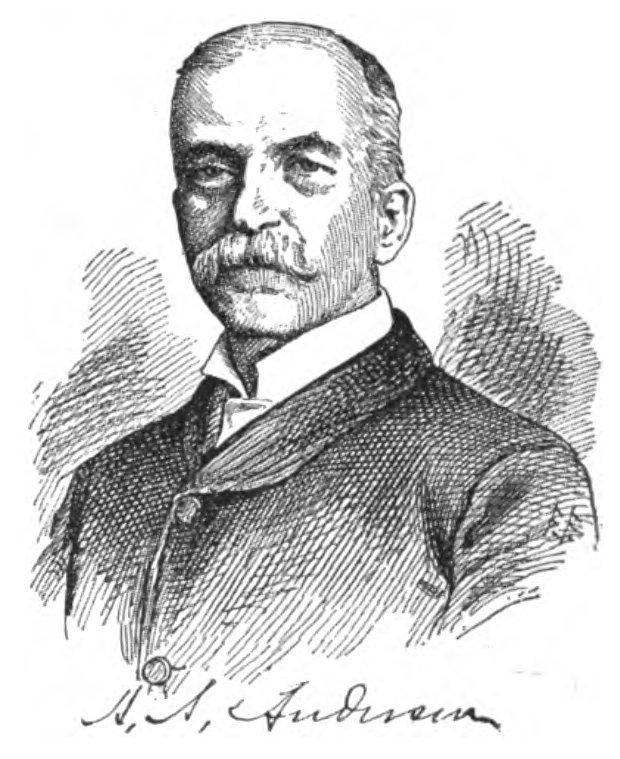
Abraham Archibald Anderson, the school's inaugural benefactor

By 1930, the state government was interested in supporting the School of Art as a public institute. The State Board of Education ruled that RPI's art school had become eligible for financial aid from both the Commonwealth of Virginia and the federal government, a decision that helped the school gain a foothold in Richmond. The sudden influx of funding allowed the school to expand its curriculum beyond drawing and painting. In addition to what VCUarts today calls the department of painting and printmaking, over the next 17 years the School of Art would add the departments of commercial art (1930–36), interior decoration (1934–36), costume design and fashion (1936), and art education (1947).

==== The Anderson Gallery of Art ====
In 1931, A.A. Anderson donated an additional $10,000 to the School of Art, which was used to found the Anderson Gallery of Art in a former carriage house behind Lewis Ginter's mansion. From the gallery's first exhibition—a solo show of Anderson's paintings—to its closure in 2015, the Anderson Gallery hosted the work of many contemporary artists who were visiting Richmond.

For five years, the gallery was the only exhibition space in Richmond where modern art could be seen first-hand, until the opening of the VMFA in 1936. That year, RPI decided to convert the Anderson Gallery into a library, which slowed its programming until the gallery's original intentions were obscured. During this time, and for the next 33 years, RPI continued to develop the Anderson Gallery as a multi-use facility, hiring full-time librarian Rosamund McCanless and adding a third-story reading room, a mezzanine, an extended book stack five stories tall, and safety features. However, the library continued to keep a selection of artist's prints, many of which were donated from Hibbs' private collection.

Hibbs himself bemoaned the school's many alterations to the space, noting that the changes were made to appease the Southern Association of Colleges, RPI's accreditor. Over three decades later, Hibbs took part in reviving the gallery's use as an art space.

=== Expansion and new leadership (1935–1966) ===
From the 1930s to the 1960s, as RPI itself expanded rapidly, the School of Art sought to organize itself into a formal place of learning rather than a small curriculum of courses. Marion M Junkin joined Theresa Pollak in 1934, and together they ran the school for eight years until Junkin moved to Washington and Lee University. During their joint leadership, students at the School of Art would win about ten scholarships from the New York Art Students' League by 1948.

In the years before RPI became VCU, the School of Art became one of the largest schools within the institute. By 1941, two photographs from the art school had been published in Life magazine. During the mid-20th century, the leadership of each department within the school would help to shape its character. Raymond Hodges served as chairman of Theatre, founded in 1942; he directed over 100 stage productions and guided the department until his retirement in 1969. The Raymond Hodges Theatre at the W.E. Singleton Center for the Performing Arts was named for him in 1985.

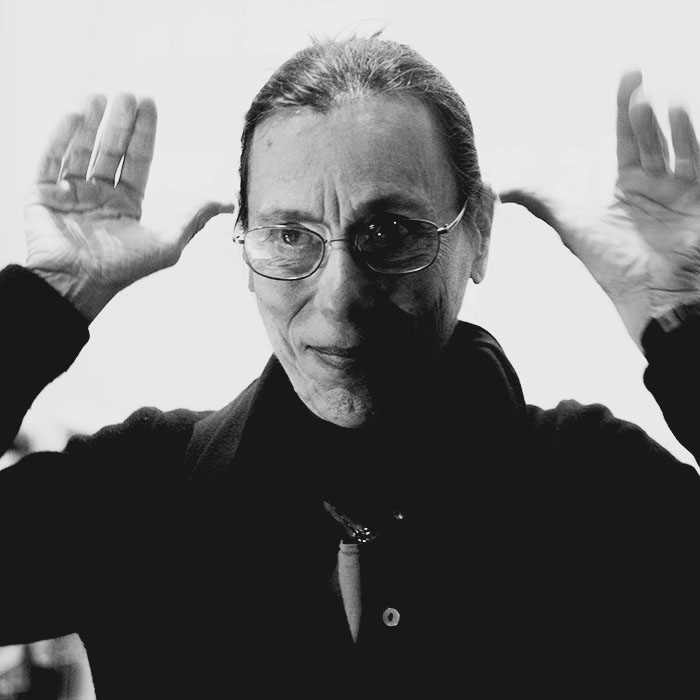
Yvonne Rainer

During her tenure, Pollak was invited eminent New York artists to Richmond for critiques and lectures, such as Kimon Nicolaïdes, Edmund Archer, Edward Rowan, and Harry Sternberg. Abstract expressionist Clyfford Still was hired to teach at RPI in 1943. While Still's students and Pollak herself grew to admire the artist and his work, he departed RPI after only two years for unknown reasons. In her writings, Pollak claims that no one in Richmond heard from him again, and that his stay at RPI was omitted from most of his biographical material.

Though Pollak was not enamored with all modern art (she remarked in 1968 that "subjective, expressive painting has become hard, schematic, ugly, or minimal"), she worked to ensure that the School of Art was an active steward of contemporary work. This would occasionally result in backlash from the traditionally conservative Southern community in Richmond. In particular, her school and leadership endured considerable censure by the administration of RPI when sculptor Robert Morris and dancer Yvonne Rainer performed nude at a school art festival.

Pollak would step down from head of the school in 1950, though she remained on the faculty in a teaching capacity for 19 years. During this period, the former head would later write, the various departments in the School of Art were disjointed and at odds with one another. Pollak opined that through the 1950s and early '60s, "the last vestige of any sense of unity" had been lost, and doubted that any incoming leadership would be capable of reining in each department into a harmonious and unified institution.

Herbert J. Burgart assumed the role of dean in 1966, earning praise from Pollak. Writing in 1969, she said, "He has the ability to see things in the large and thus to organize, while at the same time he is aware of and sensitive to the individual." Burgart received a master's and doctorate in education from Pennsylvania State University, though he did not possess formal training in the arts.

=== Transition to VCU (1966–1968) ===
By the mid-1960s, many staff and students at Richmond Professional Institute wanted to transition RPI into a full university. The institute had only recently severed ties with William & Mary, which now allowed RPI to offer degrees in the humanities. Coinciding with the implementation of new bachelor's programs in English and history, enrollment spiked at the start of the fall semester in 1965. As the Medical College of Virginia (MCV) already maintained a strong partnership with RPI, in 1966 Governor Mills Godwin recommended the General Assembly form a commission to combine MCV and RPI into a single state university. On July 1, 1968, Virginia Commonwealth University was formed.

In June 1969, founder Theresa Pollak retired. Under VCU, RPI's "School of Art" became the "School of the Arts," and later "VCUarts." It became accredited by the National Association of Schools of Art and Design in 1973.

=== Revival of the Anderson Gallery (1969–1976) ===
In 1969, the retired H.H. Hibbs was contacted by head of the department of art history Maurice Bonds about acquiring and resuscitating the Anderson Gallery—which had been a library for over 30 years—for VCUarts. By 1970, the building was officially returned to its original role as an art gallery, and continued to show work by practicing artists until 2015. Its spiritual successor, the Institute for Contemporary Art, Richmond (ICA) also known as the "Markel Center at the VCU Institute for Contemporary Art", resumes the gallery's role as a space for contemporary art. The Anderson Gallery's collection of over 3,100 works of art is now housed at VCU's Cabell Library. In 2016, the gallery reopened under the name "The Anderson," which now exclusively exhibits BFA and MFA student programming.

Notable exhibitors over the course of the Anderson Gallery's history, both under RPI and VCU, include Wassily Kandinsky, Fernand Léger, Pablo Picasso, Red Grooms, Stephen Vitiello, Larry Miller, Howard Finster, Sue Coe, Steve Poleskie, Walter Dusenbery, Komar and Melamid, Dotty Attie, Miles B. Carpenter, Hunt Slonem, Sonya Rapoport, Yoko Ono, and Judy Rifka. Former exhibitors also include Richmond's own Theresa Pollak, Joseph H. Seipel, David Freed, Davi Det Hompson, Richard Carlyon, Lester Van Winkle, Frank Cole, Milo Russell, Teresita Fernández, Elizabeth King, Reni Gower, Sonya Clark, Babatunde Lawal, and Myron Helfgott.

=== Dean DePillars leads the modern VCUarts (1977–1995) ===
In 1976, Dean Burgart resigned in favor of a new position, and Assistant Dean Murry N. DePillars became acting dean and eventually assumed the formal role of dean of the School of the Arts in 1977. DePillars, who also received his doctorate from Pennsylvania State (albeit not in education), was the first African-American dean to lead the School of the Arts.

DePillars served as dean until 1995, and under his leadership the school continued to grow in size and sophistication—particularly in regards to the departments of music and dance. DePillars was a practicing painter and illustrator, whose appreciation of jazz since his youth in Chicago brought him into contact with many prominent jazz performers; composer Anthony Braxton's 1969 double album For Alto includes a song written for DePillars, "To Artist Murray dePillars." While at VCUarts, DePillars would oversee the birth and rapid maturation of a new jazz program. Founded in 1980 by Doug Richards, Jazz Studies would become an award-winning institution at the school.

Under the new dean's leadership, the performing arts departments expanded into a number of new facilities. In 1976, the RPI Foundation acquired the Grove Avenue Baptist Church and renewed the building as the VCU Music Center, today known as the James W. Black Music Center. The W.E. Singleton Center for Performing Arts opened in 1982; its first concert was by the Vienna Symphony Orchestra, in its first U.S. performance in a decade. In 1980, the dance program moved to VCUarts from the VCU department of health and physical education, and began offering bachelor's degrees. DePillar's tenure at VCUarts would steward the opening of the VCU Dance Center on North Brunswick Street. The Lee Art Theatre on West Grace Street, a neighborhood cinema turned burlesque theater, was purchased by VCU and converted into the Grace Street Theatre, where students studying film and dance could perform and exhibit their work.

By the mid-1980s, the School of the Arts would be the third largest art school in the U.S., with over 2,000 full-time students taught by 150 faculty members. During this period, it was also the publisher of Richmond Arts Magazine and the School of the Arts Journal.

In 1989, as a gesture of international solidarity with the victims of the Tiananmen Square massacre, VCUarts students erected a "Goddess of Democracy" statue on the university commons lawn as a memorial to their slain Chinese peers. They sought the help of local artists, Richmond's Chinese community members, and the generosity of nearby merchants to complete the project.

=== Global influence (1996–2012) ===
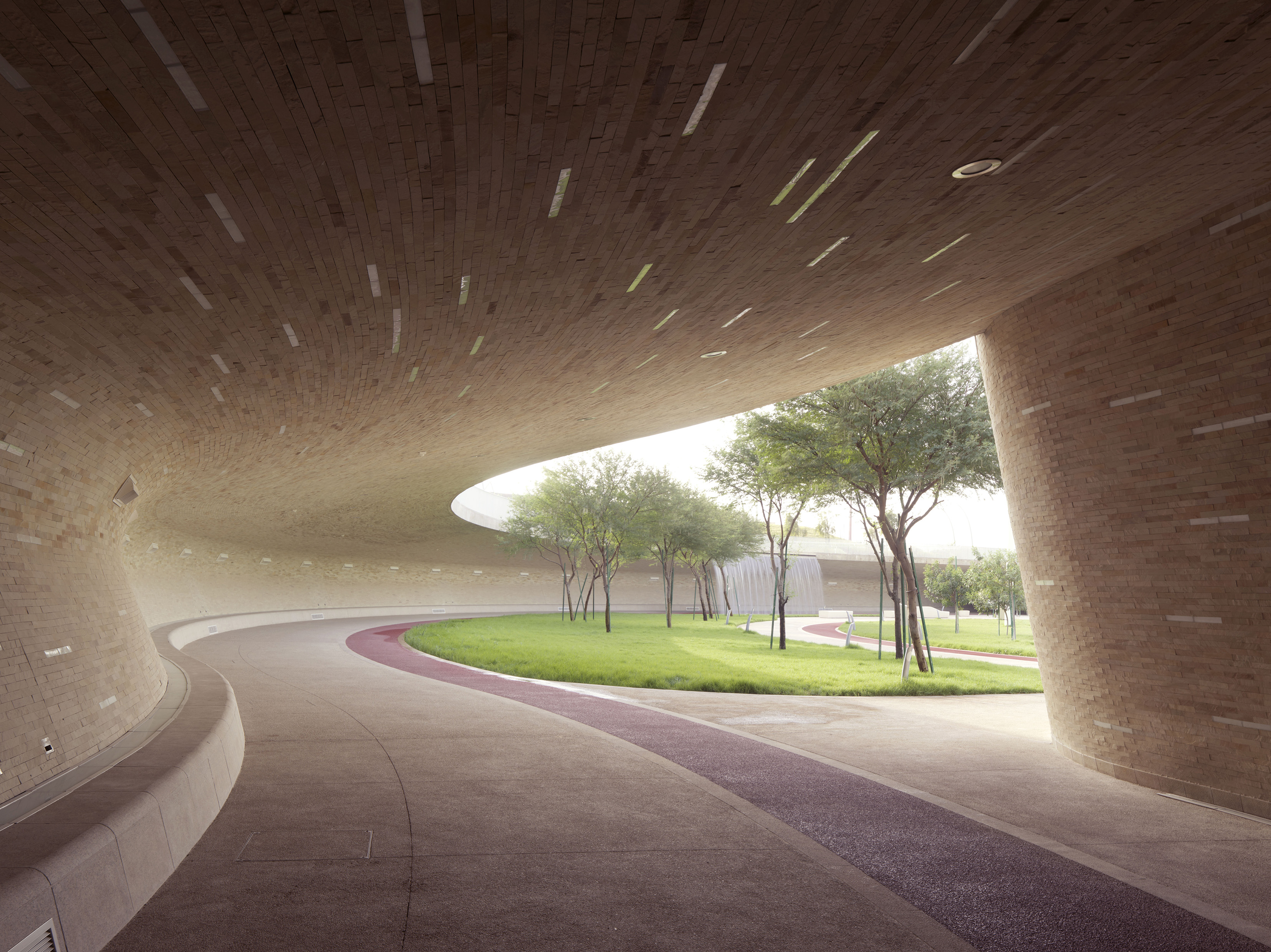
Education City in Qatar

In 1996, Richard Toscan succeeded DePillars as dean of VCUarts; over the next 14 years, the school's graduate program would see its ranking rise from 25th in the nation (according to U.S. News & World Report) to fourth.

==== VCUarts Qatar ====
In 1998, VCU opened the Qatar campus of Virginia Commonwealth University School of the Arts—the first American university to open a campus in the Gulf state—in what would become Education City. The Qatar Foundation for Education, Science and Community Development, founded in 1995, was interested in bringing reputable higher education organizations to the capital city of Doha, and VCU School of the Arts was the first to strike a deal with the Foundation. The school offered programs analogous to those at VCUarts in Art Foundation, Communication Arts + Design, Fashion Design + Merchandising, and Interior Design. In 2002, VCU transferred control of the Doha campus to VCU School of the Arts, and the name was changed to Virginia Commonwealth University School of the Arts in Qatar (also known as VCUarts Qatar). "VCUarts Qatar has substantial involvement with the emerging design industries in Qatar and is a significant catalyst for that growth."

=== The ICA and arts research (2012– ) ===
Dean Toscan's successor was Joseph H. Seipel. Seipel, who would head VCUarts from 2011 to 2016, was already a prominent figure within Richmond's arts community before his ascension to deanship. Upon his retirement, he had spent 42 years with the School of the Arts—17 of which as the Chair of Sculpture. During Seipel's tenure the ranking of the program rose to first in the nation. In 1978, Seipel would make his first mark on the city as co-founder of 1708 Gallery on 1708 East Main Street (which moved to 319 West Broad Street in 2001) and the Texas-Wisconsin Border Café in 1982.

For the five years he spent as dean of the School of the Arts, Seipel made the construction of the Institute for Contemporary Art his priority. Though he departed the school before the completion of the ICA in 2018, the privately funded museum was the largest undertaking ever by the university.

In 2017, Shawn Brixey became dean of the school, after previously serving as dean of the School of the Arts, Media, Performance and Design at York University in Toronto.

On August 5, 2019, VCU announced that Shawn Brixey would be stepping down from his administrative role as dean of VCU School of the Arts. In 2020, Carmenita Higginbotham was hired as the new dean of VCU's School of the Arts.

== Admission ==
VCU School of the Arts on average services a student body of 3,000 students, of which 200 are enrolled in graduate programs. The class of 2019 consists of approximately 600 freshman students, out of a pool of nearly 2,500 applicants. The average student in that class possesses a 3.7 GPA and a 1147 score on the SAT. 45 percent of incoming students are afforded merit-based scholarships. Prospective students of fine arts and design are asked to submit a portfolio of work along with their standardized test scores and high school transcripts. Through an online submission page, applicants submit between 12 and 16 works of art that they have created over the past two years. The work is expected to be exemplary of their current skill and potential in any chosen discipline. The school does not accept physical portfolios.

Among leading arts and design schools in the United States, VCUarts has the lowest annual tuition.

== Programs ==
VCUarts offers bachelor's degrees in disciplines ranging from the fine arts to performance, design, and scholarly research. As a prerequisite, all students who wish to enter into any of the school's fine art and design programs must first pass a year of Art Foundation, or "A.F.O."

As of 2026, VCUarts is ranked at number two in the U.S. News & World Report list of "Best Art Schools". It is ranked #4 in Graphic Design, #12 in Painting/Drawing, #2 in Printmaking, #1 in Sculpture, and #5 in Time-Based Media/New Media. In the 2016 U.S. News & World Report rankings, VCUarts was ranked as the #2 art school in the U.S., and six of their 16 programs were ranked in the top 10 (ceramics, glass, graphic design, sculpture, painting, and printmaking). VCU was previously ranked #4 in both the 2012 and 2008 U.S. News & World Report rankings. In 2017, Artsy described VCU as one of "The 15 Top Art Schools in the United States."

- Art Education (BFA, MAE, and PhD)
- Art Foundation
- Art History (BA, MA, and PhD)
- Cinema (BA)
- Communication Arts (BFA)
- Craft/Material Studies (BFA and MFA)
- Dance + Choreography (BFA)
- Fashion Design (BFA)
- Fashion Merchandising (BA)
- Graphic Design (BFA and MFA)
- Interior Design (BFA and MFA)
- Kinetic Imaging (BFA and MFA)
- Media, Art & Text (PhD), also known as MATX.
- Music (BA, BM, and MM)
- Painting + Printmaking (BFA and MFA)
- Photography + Film (BFA and MFA)
- Sculpture + Extended Media (BFA and MFA)
- Theatre (BFA, BA, and MFA)

== Campus ==
The school is on the university's Monroe Park Campus, west of downtown Richmond and north of the James River.

The Pollak Building on North Harrison Street was named for VCUarts founder Theresa Pollak in 1971.

The DePillars Building on Broad Street was named for former Dean Dr. Murry N. DePillars in 2021. The DePillars Building, formerly known as the Fine Arts Building or FAB, includes the departments of Craft/Material Studies, Kinetic Imaging, Painting and Printmaking, and Sculpture + Extended Media departments.

== Faculty ==
VCUarts has several notable faculty members. Shawné Michaelain Holloway, Eric Millikin, Kate Sicchio, and Stephen Vitiello teach in Kinetic Imaging. Caitlin Cherry teaches in Painting + Print Making. John D. Freyer, Sonali Gulati, and Sasha Waters teach in Photography + Film. Rob Tregenza teaches in Cinema. Corin Hewitt, Lily Cox-Richard, and Michael Jones McKean teach in Sculpture + Extended Media. Former VCUarts faculty include Sonya Clark and Guadalupe Maravilla.

== Alumni ==
Among the school's notable alumni working in sculpture and installation are Diana al-Hadid, Lauren Clay, Bonnie Collura, Paul DiPasquale, Tara Donovan, Sally Heller, Lisa Hoke, and Whitney Lynn. Notable alumni who work in photography include Hannah Altman, Colette Fu, Emmet Gowin, and Anne Savedge. Notable alumni who work in painting include Chino Amobi, Trudy Benson, Nell Blaine, James Bumgardner, Rose Datoc Dall, Torkwase Dyson, Judith Godwin, Abby Kasonik, Mia LaBerge, G. Byron Peck, Beatrice Riese, Carol Sutton, and Loryn Brazier. Among the school's notable new media and interdisciplinary artists, including conceptual, video and performance artists, are Tony Cokes, Dawn Kasper, Matt Kenyon, Eric Millikin, Ayanah Moor, and Alessandra Torres.

Notable alumni who work in illustration include Fahmida Azim, Daryl Cobb, Brian Hubble, Sterling Hundley, Abigail Larson, Mel Odom, Alice Tangerini, and Noah Bradley. Notable alumni graphic designers include Assil Diab, Philip B. Meggs, Alston Purvis, Phil Trumbo, and Sylvia Harris. Notable alumni fashion designers include Donwan Harrell. Notable alumni working in comics include Michael Kaluta, Rob G., Wiley Miller, Kevin Tinsley, and Charles Vess. Other notable alumni include motorsports artist Sam Bass, dancer and choreographer Ana Ines Barragan King, woodworker Katie Hudnall, book artist Lois Morrison, interior designer Charlotte Moss, animator Steve Segal, museum curator Mark Sloan, furniture maker Janice Smith, printmaker Joseph Craig English, jewelry designer and Betony Vernon.

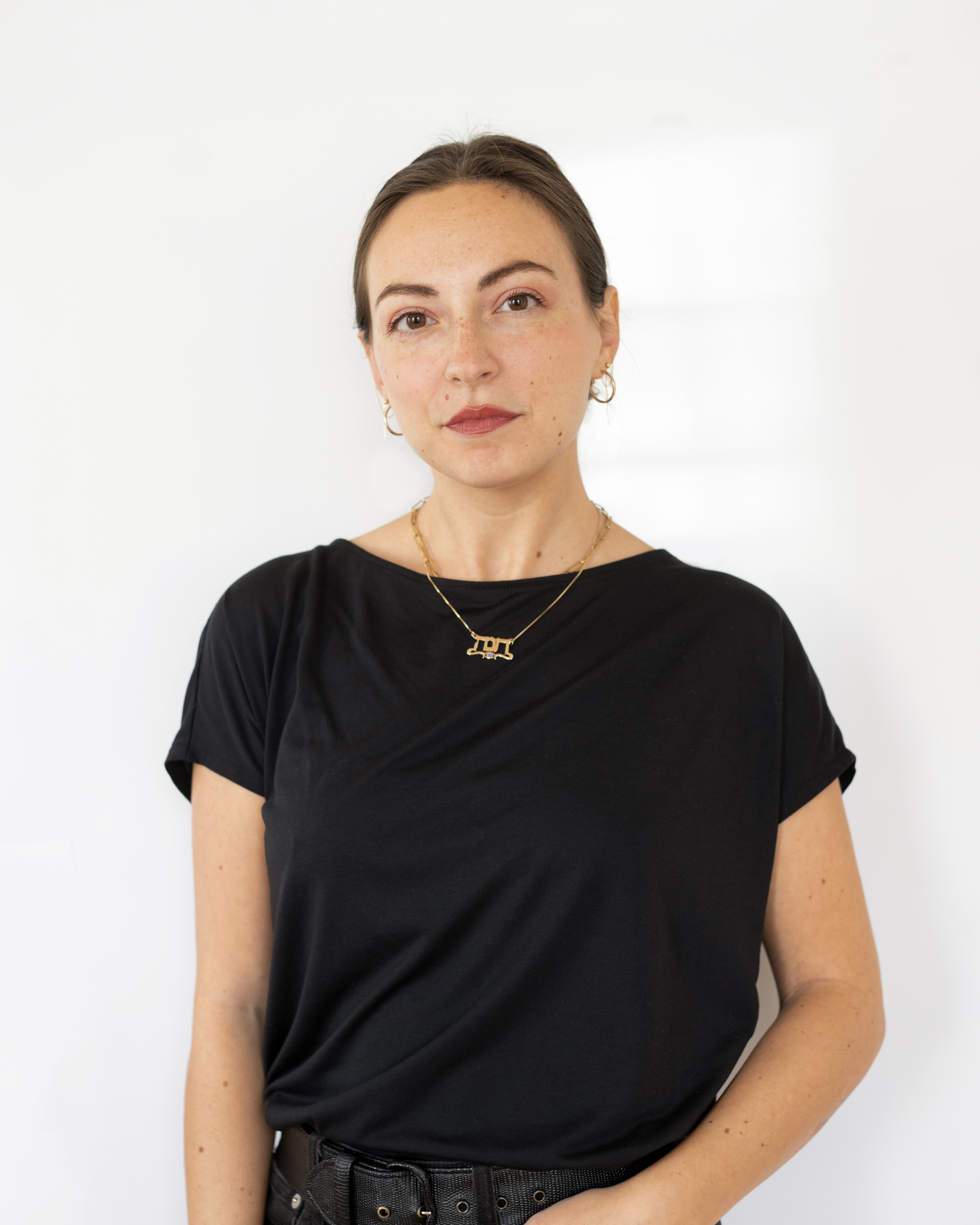
Photographer Hannah Altman (MFA 2020)

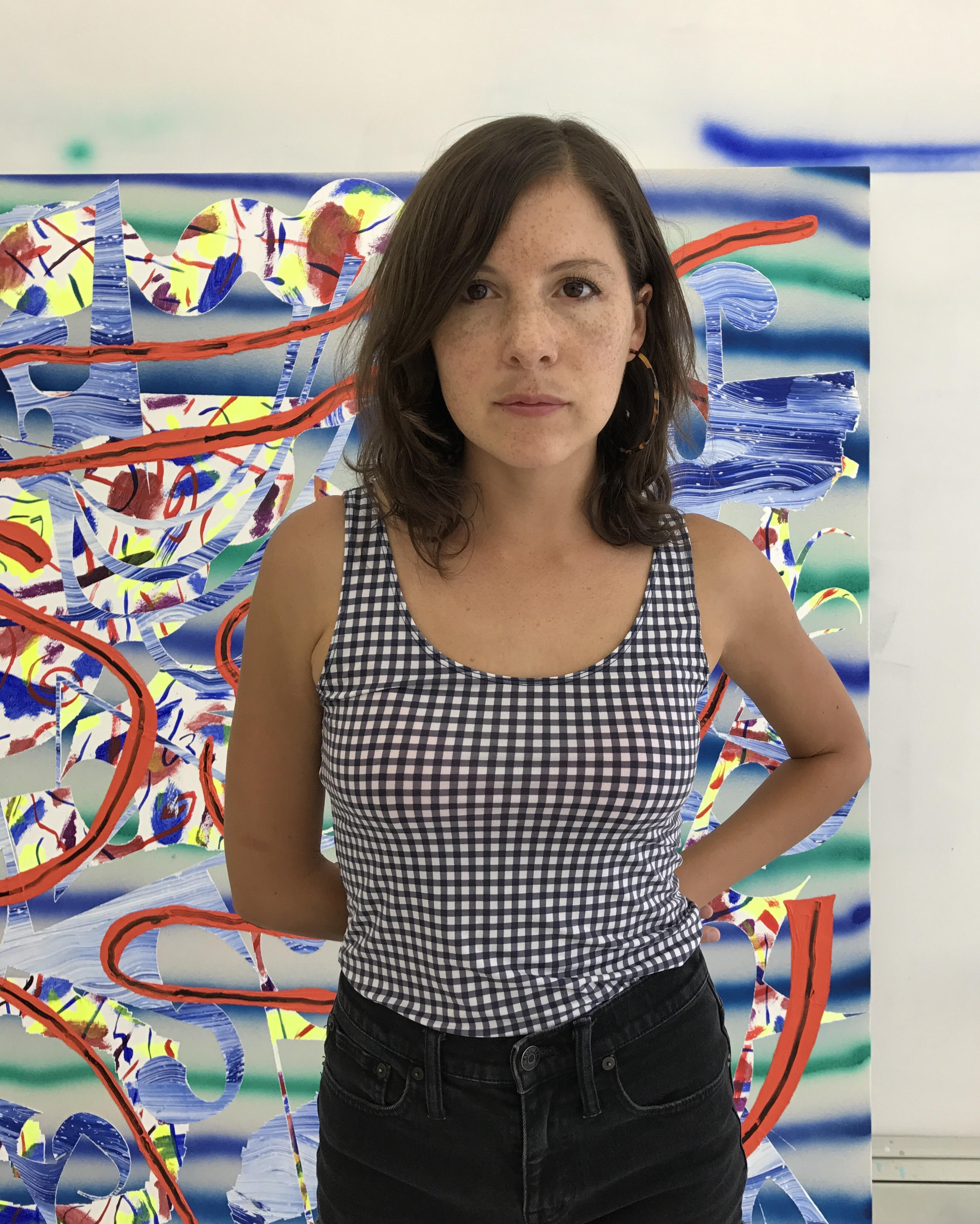
Painter Trudy Benson (BFA 2007)

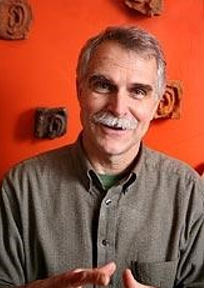
Sculptor Paul DiPasquale (MFA 1977)

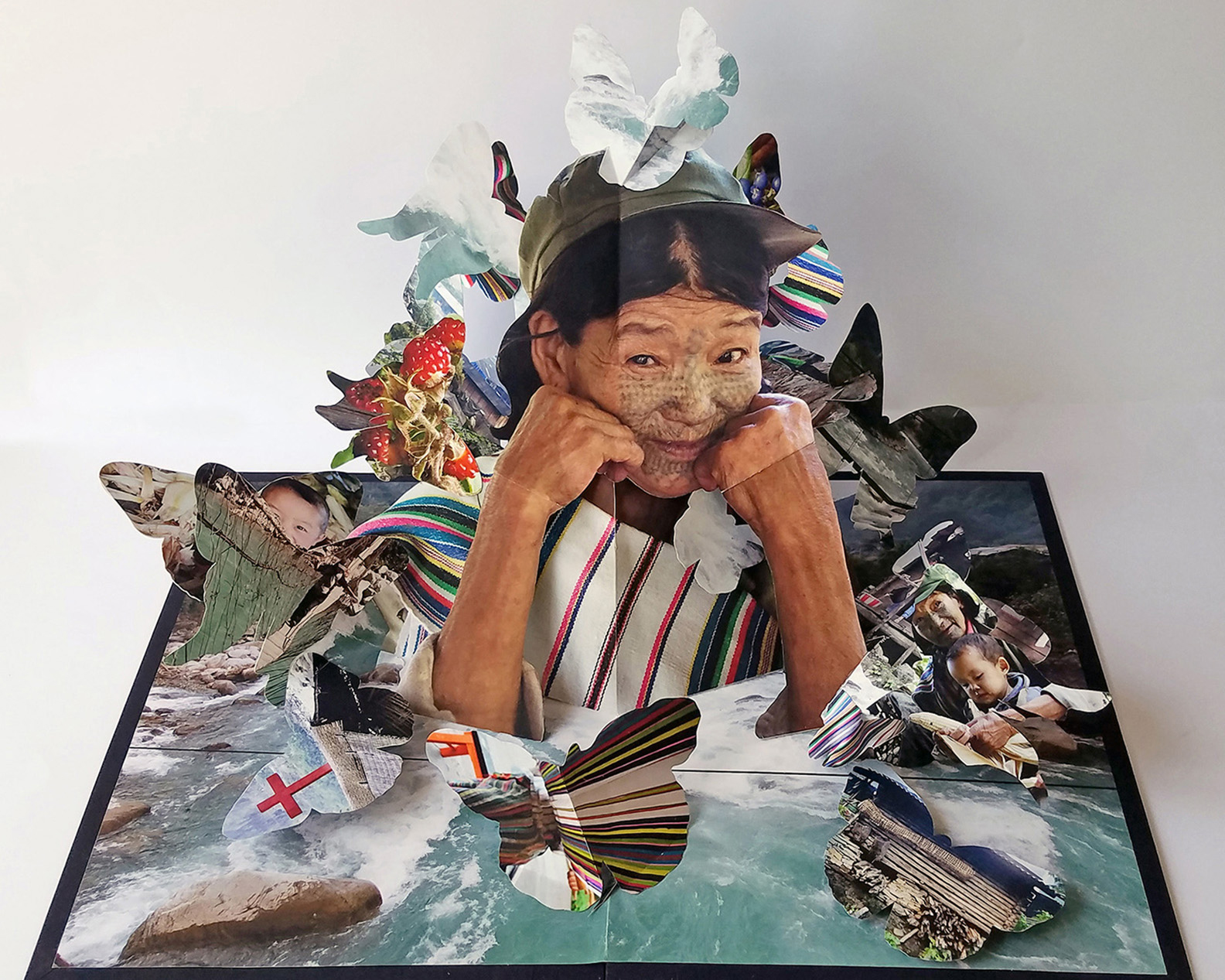
Photographer Colette Fu (BS 1999)

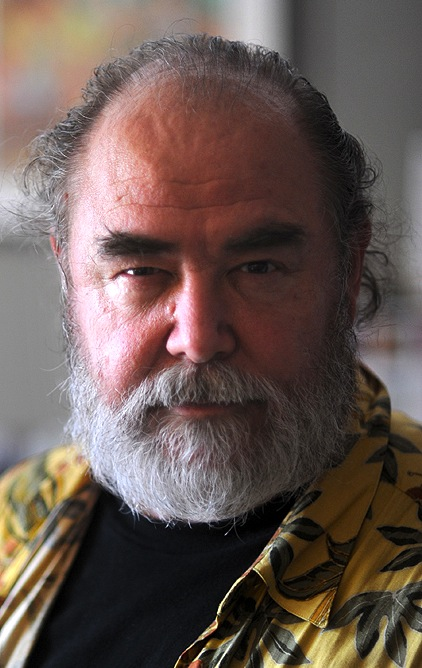
Comics artist Michael Kaluta (1966-68)

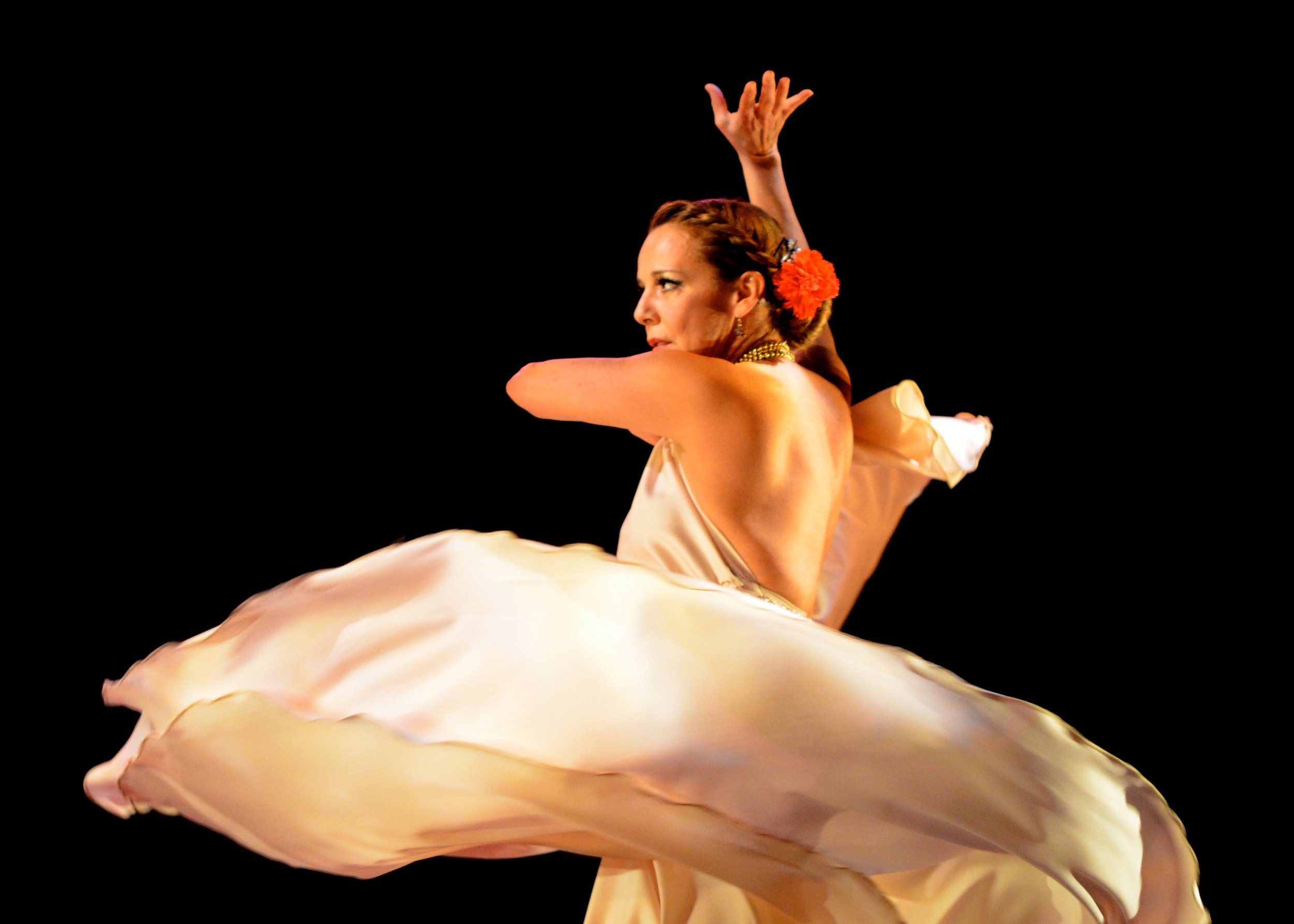
Dancer and choreographer Ana Ines Barragan King

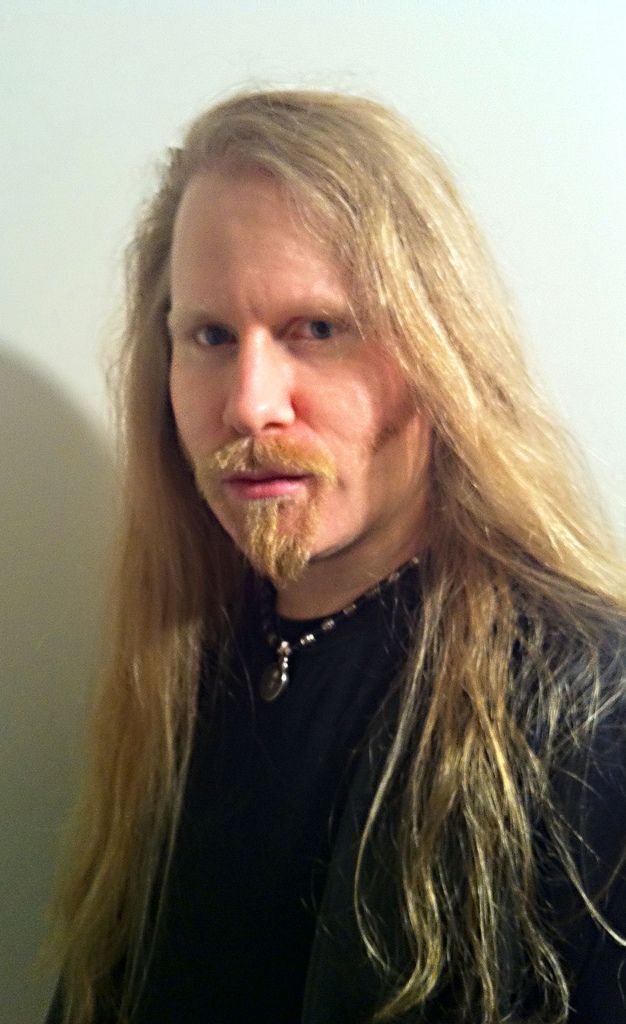
New media artist Eric Millikin (MFA 2021)

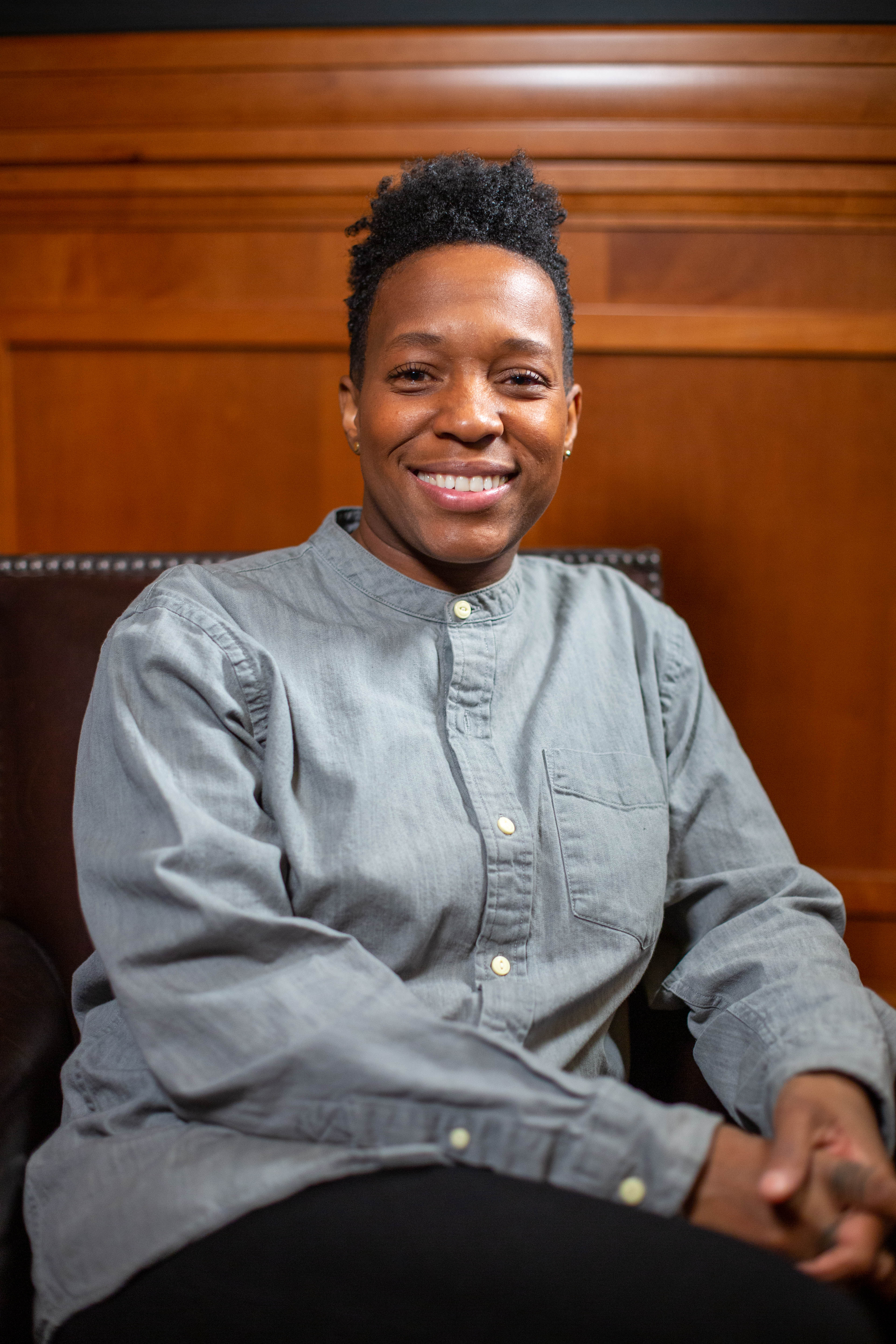
Conceptual artist Ayanah Moor (BFA 1995)

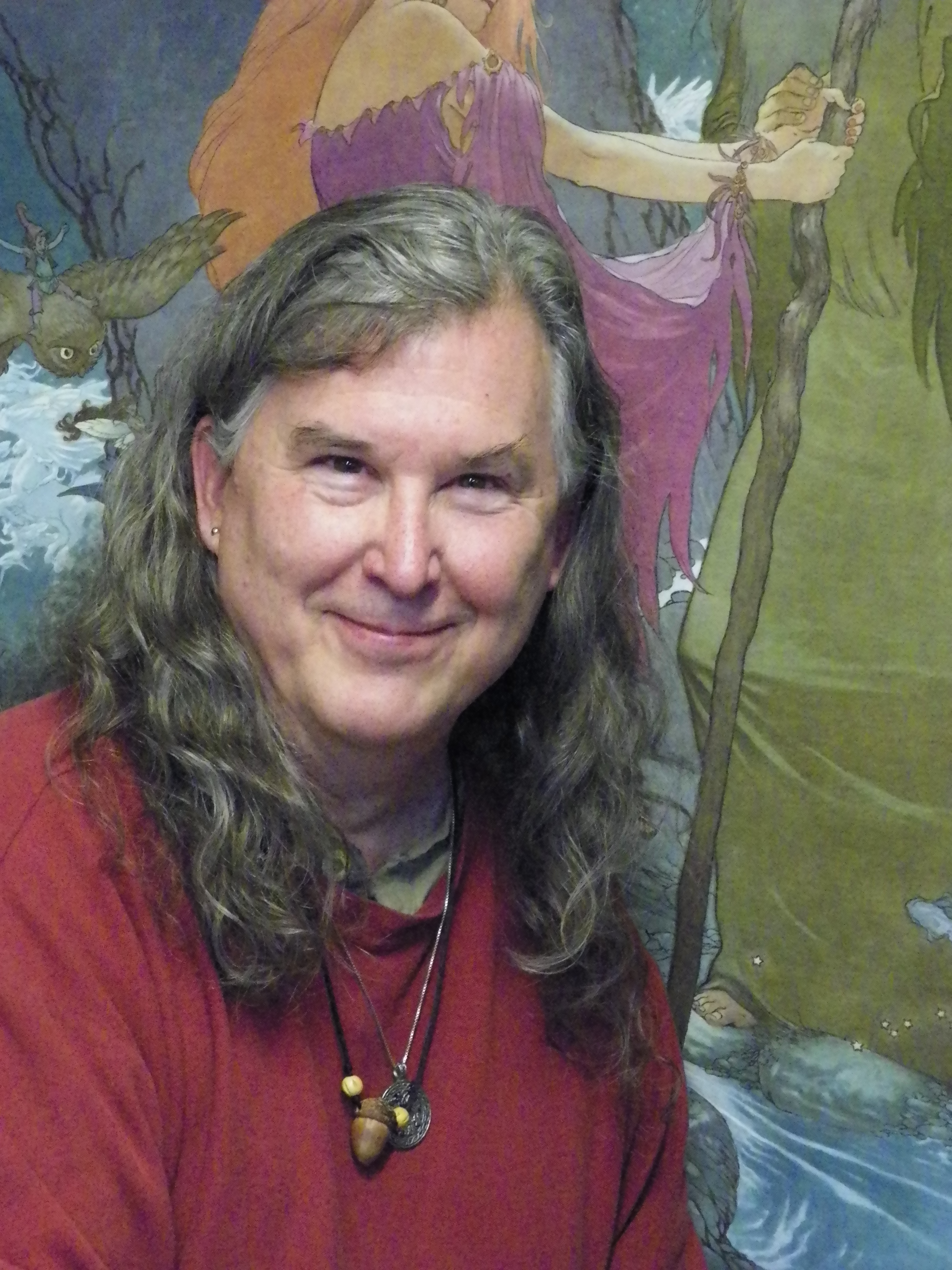
Comics artist Charles Vess (BFA 1974)

== Notes ==
1. RPI was formerly known as the "Richmond Division of the College of William and Mary" until 1939, when its name changed to "Richmond Professional Institute of William and Mary." Due to political squabbles between RPI and William & Mary (described once as "coeds" in a North Carolina newspaper of the time), the institute and college severed their partnership long before RPI's consolidation into VCU in 1968.
