= David Freed (printmaker) =

American artist

David Freed (born 1936) is an American artist based in Richmond, Virginia where he taught at Virginia Commonwealth University School of the Arts. His art has been shown extensively throughout the world and is in the collections of major museums and private collections. He is known for his masterful prints using the intaglio technique of etching and for his collaboration with major poets such as Charles Wright and Larry Levis in creating artist's books combining his etchings with their poetry.

== Education ==
After earning a BFA from Miami University, David Freed attended the University of Iowa in the early 1960s where he met the poet Charles Wright with whom he would later collaborate. Freed and Wright were both pursuing MFA degrees, but in different fields. Wright was working on a degree in poetry from the Iowa Writers’ Workshop and Freed was in visual arts, studying under legendary printmaker Mauricio Lasansky. In 1963 both Freed and Wright were awarded Fulbright grants, with which Freed continued the study of printmaking at the Royal College of Art in London and Wright worked on his poetry in Italy.

== Exhibitions and collections ==
In Richmond, Freed was represented by Reynolds Gallery. also in Richmond. His prints and collaborative poem books are in the collection of Virginia Commonwealth University's James Branch Cabell Library's Special Collection and Archives. In 1996 he curated an exhibition 30 Years of VCU Printmaking at Artspace. His art is included in the collection of the Smithsonian American Art Museum Renwick Gallery. Other collections include: Albertina Museum, Austria; Albright-Knox Gallery, Buffalo, New York; Art Institute of Chicago; Bowes Museum, Exeter, England; British Government Art Collection; Brooklyn Museum, Brooklyn, New York; Corcoran Gallery, Washington, D.C.; Fitzwilliam Museum, Cambridge, England; Frederic R. Weisman Museum, University of Minnesota, Minneapolis; Library of Congress, Washington, D.C.; Kings Place Gallery, The Ruth Borchard Collection, London; Mint Museum, Charlotte, North Carolina; Morris Museum of Art, Augusta, Georgia; Museum Boymans van Beuningen, Holland; Museum of Modern Art, New York; National Collection of Fine Arts, Washington, D.C.]; Oklahoma Art Center, Oklahoma City; and Philadelphia Museum of Art.

In 2001 Ted Potter presented David Freed, Printmaker, the first comprehensive museum exhibition of works by Virginia Commonwealth University's School of the Arts faculty member David Freed. Ted Potter, then the gallery director of VCU's Anderson Gallery both curated and wrote the 107-page illustrated exhibition catalog for the David Freed retrospective show. "David Freed epitomizes the artist/teacher, whose commitment to teaching excellence enhances rather than limits his ability to make significant art," said Potter, adding, "This retrospective exhibition is a fitting tribute to this master printmaker and dedicated teacher."

== Critical reception ==
Pulitzer Prize-winning poet Charles Wright said of Freed: "There is a modesty in Freed's work - not of ambition but of presentation - that is like the spread of light in certain Renaissance paintings. One doesn't know where it comes from, but it is everywhere, enlightening, leaving us, somehow, more room to look in, a seduction of sorts that eschews excess." Freed and Charles Wright met again while on holiday in Italy from their Fulbright grants. From that meeting began the idea of Freed's collaboration with Charles Wright on "Six Poems." The collaborations of Freed with Charles Wright, in 2014-2015 the Poet Laureate of the United States, and with award-winning poet Larry Levis have been chronicled in the pages of Blackbird, an online journal of literature and the arts.

In addition to the Fulbright Grant, other awards to Freed include Virginia Commonwealth University Award of Distinction, Southern Graphic Council (2009); Theresa Pollak Prize for Excellence in the Arts, Richmond, Virginia (2001); Faculty Grant-in-Aid, Virginia Commonwealth University (1989–90; 1983–84); Virginia Museum of Fine Arts (1983–84); Nattie Marie Jones Fellowship (1983); and World Print Competition (1977).

== Teaching ==
Beginning in 1966 Freed was a full-time printmaking professor at Virginia Commonwealth University's School of the Arts. After his Fulbright work, he returned to the United States in 1964 to teach sculpture, design and children's classes at the Toledo Museum of Art.

In an interview by Roy Proctor of the Richmond Times-Dispatch, Freed said,

Every new generation comes along with a new set of problems, and I've learned far more from my students than they've learned from me. . . . I don't like to make students work in the way I would work, and I would not presume to tell students that they should work in a certain style. But there are certain things I've told students that have stood the test of time. I tell students that there are no new stories, but that they have to tell those old stories as if they're telling them for the first time. In other words, they have to be true to themselves."

Freed has been a visiting lecturer at Reading University, England (1992); Central School of Art, England (1989, 1986, 1977, 1976, 1969); Brighton School of Art, Brighton, England (1989); Is Bisonte, Florence, Italy (1989); Loughborough University School of Art, Loughborough, England (1986, 1976); University of Virginia, Charlottesville (1997, 1974); and the John Ruskin School, Oxford, England (1972, 1970).

== Biography ==
David Freed was born in Toledo, Ohio, in 1936, the first child of Clark and Thelma Freed. He and his wife, Mary, live in Richmond, Virginia and have two sons.
