= Shawn Brixey =

American artist

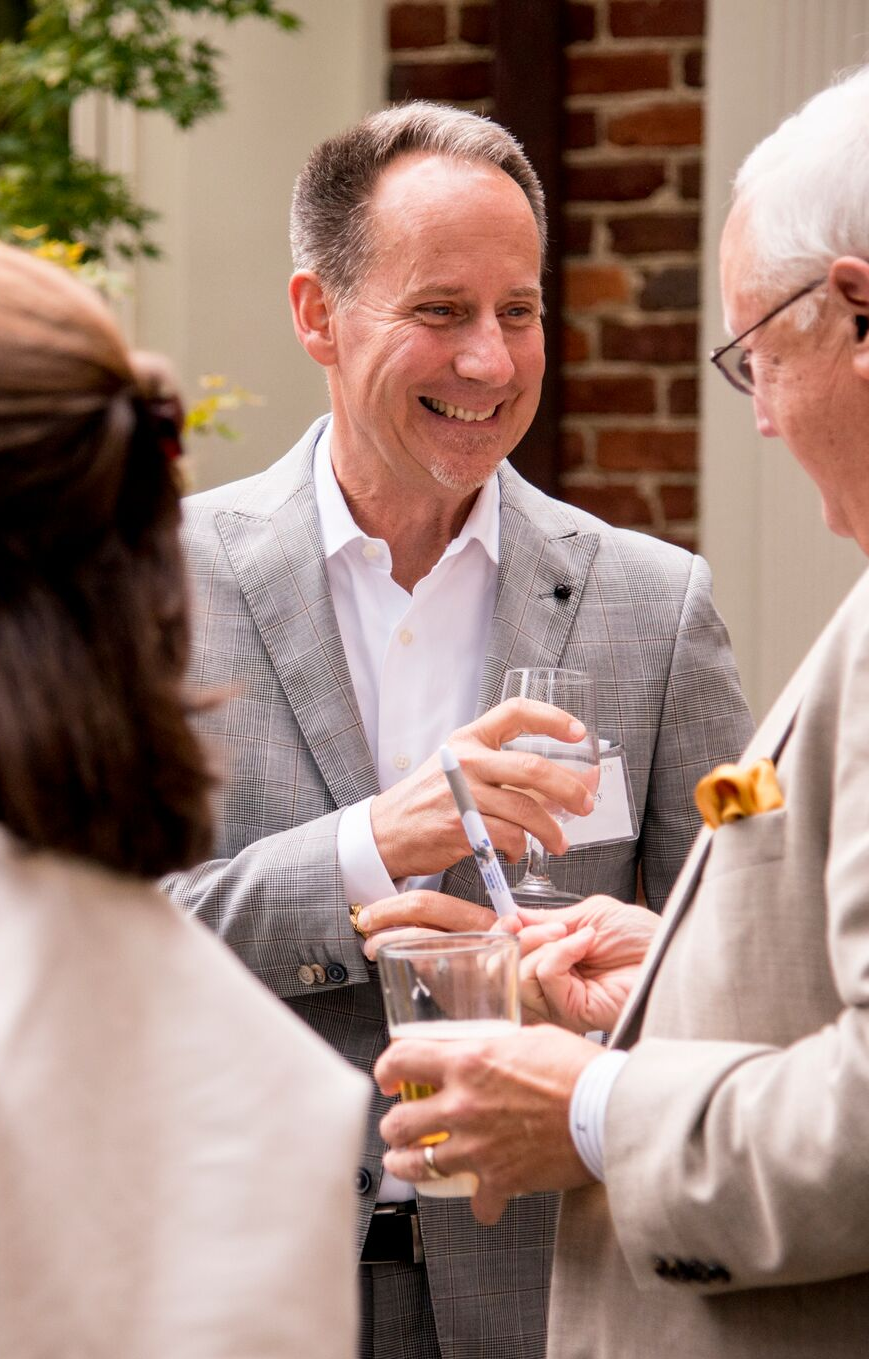
- Shawn Brixey at a 2017 VCUarts event.
- Born: January 23, 1961 (age 65); Springfield, Missouri, U.S.
- Education: Kansas City Art Institute (BFA); Massachusetts Institute of Technology (MSVisS)
- Known for: Installation art, Telematics, New media art, BioArt
- Notable work: Photon Voice (1987); Alchymeia (1998); Chimera Obscura (2002); Eon (2003)

Shawn Brixey (born January 23, 1961, in Springfield, Missouri) is an artist, educator, researcher, and inventor.

Brixey attended both the Kansas City Art Institute and the Massachusetts Institute of Technology in the 1980s to pursue a hybridized form of artmaking that employs engineering tools to create ephemeral and large-scale works. Since 1990, he has served as a visiting artist, faculty member, and chair of a number of North American arts institutions, including the Cranbrook Academy of Art, University of Washington, and Canadian Foundation for Innovation. In 2013, he became Dean of the Faculty of Fine Arts at York University, in Toronto, Ontario. From 2017 to 2019, he served as Dean of Virginia Commonwealth University's School of the Arts, the Special Assistant to the Provost for the School of the Arts in Qatar, and both a professor of VCUarts and an affiliate professor of the VCU College of Engineering.

== Early life ==
Shawn Brixey was born in Springfield, Missouri, the son of two professional artists. His father was an actor on Broadway in the interwar years; his mother was a symphony cellist. While Brixey was growing up, his parents transitioned into the film and broadcast industries, as well as Madison Avenue advertising.

As a result of early exposure to the arts and telecommunications, Brixey adopted an unorthodox attitude toward artmaking during his years spent in higher education. In the 1980s, he attended the Kansas City Art Institute. In a 2016 TEDx talk, Brixey claimed that institute once bussed himself and other classmates 300 miles out to western Kansas as a supposed solution to student boredom and lack of focus. He says he and others were dropped off individually in 10-mile increments and given the instruction to "make a perfect line" or "make a perfect moment." The work he allegedly created was a compass fabricated out of magnetized wheat chaff placed in a puddle. During his undergraduate years, Brixey worked with famed sculptor Dale Eldred. He graduated from KCAI as a bachelor of fine arts in sculpture in 1985.

== Career ==
Brixey attended the graduate program at the Center for Advanced Visual Studies at the Massachusetts Institute of Technology from 1986 to 1988; he is described by MIT as an "environmental artist." Over the next decade, he worked to build similar "new media" programs at the universities of Kentucky and Washington, before joining the faculty of University of California, Berkeley as the Founding Director of the New Media Program.

He rejoined the faculty at the University of Washington to co-found the University of Washington's Center for Digital Arts and Experimental Media (DXARTS) program with composer Richard Karpen in 2001. In 2008, Brixey was selected to be the University of Washington's Floyd and Delores Jones Endowed Chair in the Arts.

In 2013, Brixey became Dean of the Faculty of Fine Arts at York University.

In 2017, Virginia Commonwealth University announced that Brixey was named the new dean of VCU School of the Arts, following the tenure of former dean Joseph H. Seipel. In August 2019, he resigned from his administrative role, while remaining a tenured faculty member at VCU.

== Art ==
As an artist, Brixey creates work that utilizes highly complex scientific technology and synthetic materials. His work rarely takes permanent shape as traditional sculpture or photographs, instead existing as phenomena that are triggered by machines or natural process.

His installation Alchymeia takes the form of atomic crystals, generated from the base of a human hormone. One iteration of this work proposed using the urine of athletes as the source of the hormones. Other projects utilize high-powered lights, vacuum chambers, microscopes, polarized projectors, and lasers.

== Exhibitions ==
- Documenta 8 in Kassel, Germany 1987
- The Deutscher Kunstlerbund in Karlsruhe, Germany 1988
- The International Symposium of Electronic Art at the Art Institute of Chicago 1997
- The Winter Olympics in Nagano, Japan 1998
- Henry Art Gallery, University of Washington, Seattle 2002
- The National Products Building, Philadelphia, Pennsylvania 2004
- The Schneider Museum of Art, Southern Oregon University, Ashland, Oregon 2009.

== Awards and distinctions ==
In 2004 Brixey and two DXARTS doctoral students Bret Battey and Ian Ingram received an Editors Choice Award in Popular Science Magazine's "World Design Challenge". The winning entry was awarded for novel use of feedforward ultrasound technology used to produce wide-field active noise cancellation in underwater environments specifically to protect endangered marine mammals.
