= Judith Godwin =

American abstract painter (1930–2021)

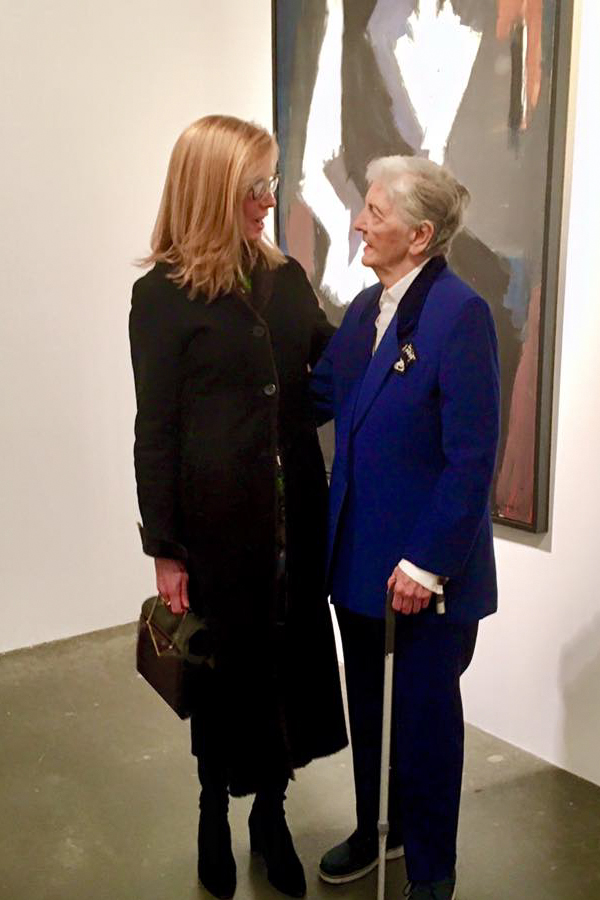
- New York artists Kate Cordsen and Judith Godwin
- Born: February 5, 1930; Suffolk, Virginia
- Died: May 29, 2021 (aged 91)
- Alma mater: Mary Baldwin College, Richmond Professional Institute
- Known for: Painting
- Movement: Abstract Expressionism

Judith Godwin (February 5, 1930 – May 29, 2021) was an American abstract painter, associated with the Abstract Expressionist movement.

== Early life and education ==
Judith Godwin was born in Suffolk, Virginia, in 1930 to a father who was interested in architecture and landscape gardening. His interests created an environment that inspired and encouraged Judith to pursue painting. She attended Mary Baldwin College in 1948 for two years. It was there that she met Martha Graham, who performed there in 1950. Godwin transferred to Richmond Professional Institute (RPI), now Virginia Commonwealth University, where she completed her degree in 1952. While there, she studied with Maurice Bond, Jewett Campbell, and Theresa Pollak. At the time, women were required to wear a skirt in the cafeteria; Godwin wore jeans after rushing from a studio class and was reported to the dean of the school, Margaret Johnson, who then met with her and changed the rule to allow women to wear jeans. While at RPI, she was in classes and close friends with Richard Carlyon.

She also attended the Art Students League of New York, where she studied with artists Will Barnet, Harry Sternberg, and Vaclav Vytlacil. During this time she also attended the Hans Hofmann School of Fine Arts, and met artists such as Jackson Pollock, Franz Kline, Willem de Kooning, and Marcel Duchamp. She lived in Greenwich Village, Manhattan, but as a native Virginian, remained a member of the Jamestowne Society. Her papers are held at the Archives of American Art.

== Career ==
Godwin's first solo exhibition was in 1950 at Mountcastle's in Suffolk, Virginia. At the suggestion of her RPI college instructor Jewett Campbell, she moved to New York City in 1953 to attend the Art Students League and study under Hans Hofmann, who influenced her work heavily. She studied with Hofmann in his studio on 8th Street, and noted his wife Miz as another important influence. Godwin said that... "I think the main thing with Hofmann was that I felt completely free to do whatever I wanted to do." Godwin's notable classmates during this era included Will Barnet, Harry Sternberg, and Vaclav Vytlacil. Godwin credited Hofmann with making her feel at home after moving to New York, as well as with challenging her conservative color palette and technique. Hofmann also helped Godwin move away from the influence of cubism and towards abstract expressionism.

In 1958, James Brooks invited her to participate in the Stable Gallery Invitational Show. In the late 1950s, through Kenzo Okada, she met and was invited by Betty Parsons to join her new gallery, Section Eleven, becoming the youngest woman to ever show her work there. At Betty Parsons' show, Godwin met the director for the Solomon R. Guggenheim Museum, James Johnson Sweeney. He was interested in Godwin, and asked her to send a small collection of her work. He received Abstraction 1954 and Abstraction #15. He enjoyed her work, although at the time he did not add them to the Guggenheim Collection. She shared a studio with Franz Kline. She also met other prominent male artists such as Mark Rothko and Marcel Duchamp.

Her success in mid-century Abstract Expressionism is notable, as there were few women celebrated among a movement associated with well-known male artists such as Jackson Pollock and Willem de Kooning. In a 1981 interview, Godwin stated: "when I first went to New York in the early 1950s, there were just a few thousand painters living there... now there are tens of thousands so many people trying to gain notice, its unbelievable how competitive it is...." She credits her professor, Jewett Campbell, with her desire to move to New York City.

In the 1980s she maintained three studios, one in a barn in Connecticut, one in Greenwich Village in New York City, and one in Suffolk, Virginia. In 1999 Godwin was a panelist for "Hans Hofmann as Artist and Teacher" symposium at the Metropolitan Museum of Art in New York City.

== Style ==
Godwin was considered a second-generation abstract expressionist. She practiced a style of painting that emphasized interpretation of experience and emotion through improvisational construction of the work, combining the language of color with gestural movements. Her work was influenced by environmental causes, gardening, modern dance, and Zen. Her passion for the environment was a recurring element in her canvases, although these landscape elements refer to the artist's inner terrain, which often echo the disturbances of external nature. Her early influences arose out of her childhood and having assisted her father with gardening. Soon after moving to New York City, she became friends with Martha Graham through an earlier connection made while still a student at Mary Baldwin College. Graham's performances influenced Godwin, who often incorporated the dancer and choreographer's dynamic gestures into the composition of a painting. Speaking of one such piece, her 9-foot wide diptych The Ring, Godwin said, "I most often begin to paint by envisioning form and space in nature and then interpret my ideas and feelings into planes of color on the canvas. When I recognize an emerging form, I respond intuitively by evolving complementary sub-forms in colors and applications which feel supportive and foster development. In studying color and its behavior, I have learned to trust my intuition." Another of her paintings is titled Ode to Martha Graham.

Early in her career Godwin employed a strong, aggressive style in order to silence the male critics who dismissed women's contributions to the art world at that time. Over the course of her career her color palette evolved, first softening and later becoming bright again. In the 1990s, Godwin began incorporating subtle assemblage to her canvases. Of this later direction she said, "I think it came out of needing to add something to the surfaces of my paintings...I don't want them to jump out."

In a statement made for "Celebration of Women in the Arts," at Northern Michigan University in 1978, Godwin said ..."The act of painting is for me, as a woman, an act of freedom, and a realization that images generated by the female experience can be a powerful and creative expression for all humanity. My paintings are personal statements - extensions of myself. I take a truth, an intimate emotion, a question, an answer – and paint it. It is natural for me to mediate upon reality rather than on the romantic, and yet my work often results in a mixture of both"

== Awards and honors ==
1989 Honorary Doctor of Fine Arts, Virginia Commonwealth University, Richmond, VA

Professional Achievement Alumni Award from the School of the Arts, Virginia Commonwealth University, Richmond, VA

2002 Career achievement award from Mary Baldwin College, Staunton, VA

Honorary Doctor of Humane Letters Degree from Mary Baldwin College, Staunton, VA

== Personal life ==
Her family home in Suffolk was called "Whitehall" and her ancestry goes back to the first settlers in the Virginia Colony. Godwin's mother was Judith Brewer Godwin who was associated with the Association for the Preservation of Virginia Antiquities and a one-time president of the Garden Club of Virginia. Godwin's father was Frank Whitney Godwin, a dentist and decorated veteran of World War I who later became a national vice commander of the American Legion, and was additionally an amateur architect.

Judith Godwin was a cousin of Virginia Governor Mills E. Godwin, Jr.

During the 1950s she embraced the Zen idea, living with few objects in a modest apartment in Greenwich Village. During the 1950s and 1960s she took on jobs restoring houses and working as an apprentice to a plasterer and mason, as well as some interior design work and fabric design. In 1963 Godwin purchased a brownstone in Greenwich Village previously owned by Franz Kline.

During the 1980s she picketed against an annual furriers convention in New York.

== Collections ==
- Museum of Modern Art
- Metropolitan Museum of Art
- San Francisco Museum of Modern Art
- National Gallery of Art, Washington, D.C.
- Chicago Art Institute
- Hirshhorn Museum and Sculpture Garden
- Utah Museum of Fine Arts
- Yale University Art Gallery
- Milwaukee Art Center
- National Museum of Art, Osaka, Japan
- National Museum of Wales, Cardiff, South Wales
- National Museum of Women in the Arts, Washington, DC
- North Carolina Museum of Art
- Newark Museum, Newark, New Jersey
- Amarillo Museum of Art, Amarillo, TX
- Greenville County Museum of Art, Greenville, South Carolina
- The Johnson Collection, Spartanburg, South Carolina
- Herbert F. Johnson Museum of Art, Cornell University, Ithaca, NY
- Gannett Center, Columbia University, NY
- Mary Baldwin College, Staunton, VA
- Mount Holyoke College Art Museum, Mount Holyoke, MA
- Sheldon Memorial Art Gallery, University of Nebraska, Lincoln, NE
- Ulrich Museum, Wichita State University, Wichita, KS
- University of Pennsylvania, Philadelphia, PA
- Weatherspoon Art Gallery, University of North Carolina, Greensboro, NC
- Vassar College Museum, Poughkeepsie, NY
- Smith College Museum of Art, Northampton, MA
- The Hyde Collection, Glenn Falls, New York

== Exhibitions ==
- 1950 Mountcastle's, Suffolk, VA
- 1951 Norfolk Museum of Arts and Sciences, Irene Leache Memorial, Norfolk, VA
- 1952 Abingdon Square Painters, New York City
- 1951–53 Group shows at the Valentine Museum and Linden Gallery, Richmond, VA
- 1953 Group show, Provincetown Art Association
- 1954 "An Environment of Expression", Theatre-Go-Round, Virginia Beach, VA
- 1954 Group show, Virginia Intermont College, Bristol, VA
- 1958 Stable Gallery Invitational Show, New York City
- 1958 Group Show, Betty Parsons, Section Eleven, New York City
- 1959 Group Show, Betty Parsons, Section Eleven, New York City
- 1959 Solo Show, Betty Parsons, Section Eleven, New York City
- 1959 Group Show, St. Lawrence University, Canton, NY
- 1960 Solo Show, Betty Parsons, Section Eleven, New York City
- 1960 Group Show, University of Colorado, Boulder, CO
- 1977 Solo Show, Ingber Gallery, New York City
- 1977–79 Group Shows, Ingber Gallery, New York City
- 1977–79 Danforth Museum, Danforth, MA
- 1977–79 University of Michigan, Marquette, MI
- 1977–79 Virginia Commonwealth University, Richmond, VA
- 1977–79 Weatherspoon Gallery, University of North Carolina, Greensboro, NC
- 1978 Solo Show, Mary Baldwin College, Staunton, VA
- 1979 Solo Show, Ingber Gallery, New York City
- 1980 Provincetown Art Association and Museum, "Hans Hofmann as Teacher: Drawings by His Students"
- 1981 Solo Show, Ingber Gallery, New York City
- 1981 Solo Show, Womensbank, Richmond, VA
- 1982 Solo Show, Loonan Gallery, Bridgehampton, NY
- 1983 Group Show, Marisa del Re Gallery, NY
- 1984 Solo Show, Northern Michigan University, Marquette
- 1985 Solo Show, Lockwood-Matthews Mansion Museum, Norwalk, CT
- 1986 Retrospective Solo Show, Virginia Polytechnic Institute and State University, Blacksburg, VA
- 1987 Solo Show, Ingber Gallery, NY
- 1987 Group Show, Graham Gallery, NY and PMW Gallery, Stanford, CT
- 1988 Solo Show, Northern Virginia Community College, Alexandria, VA
- 1989 Solo Show, Danville Museum, Danville, VA
- 1989 Solo Show, Virginia and Suffolk Museum, Virginia
- 1990 Group Show, Marisa del Re Gallery, NY
- 1991 Group Show, Marisa del Re Gallery, NY
- 1992 Solo Show, Marisa del Re Gallery, NY
- 1993-1994 Group Show, Marisa del Re Gallery, NY
- 1995-1996 Solo Show, Amarillo Museum of Art, Amarillo, TX
- 1997 Group Show, Marisa del Re Gallery, NY
- 1997 Solo Show, Art Museum of Western Virginia, Roanoke, VA
- 2000 Solo Show, Albany Museum of Art, Albany, GA
- 2001 Solo Show, Mary H. Dana Women Artists Series, Mabel Smith Douglass Library, Rutgers, The State University of New Jersey, New Brunswick, NJ
- 2002 Solo Show, Delaware Center for the Arts, Wilmington DE
- 2003 Holtzman Art Gallery, Towson University
- 2004 National Academy of Design's Annual Invitational Exhibition, NY, NY
- 2005 Group Show, "Betty Parsons and the Women", Anita Shapolsky Gallery, NY, NY
- 2008 Solo Show, McNay Art Museum, San Antonio, TX
- 2009 Tobin Theatre Arts Gallery
- 2010 Spanierman Gallery
- 2011 Spanierman Gallery
- 2012 Virginia Museum of Fine Arts and the Anderson Gallery of Virginia Commonwealth University
- 2013 Group Show, "Ab-Ex/Re-Con", Nassau County Museum of Art, Roslyn, NY
- 2016 Group Show, "Women of Abstract Expressionism", Denver Art Museum, Denver, CO.
- 2016 Group Show, "Women of Abstract Expressionism", Mint Museum, Charlotte, NC
- 2017 Group Show, "Women of Abstract Expressionism", Palm Springs Art Museum, Palm Springs, CA
- 2017, "Judith Godwin," Berry Campbell, New York
- 2019, "Judith Godwin: An Act of Freedom," Berry Campbell, New York
- 2023, Action, Gesture, Paint: Women Artists and Global Abstraction 1940-1970,Whitechapel Gallery, London.
