= Shawné Michaelain Holloway =

American new media and performance artist

- Born: 1991 (age 34–35); Wright-Patterson Air Force Base, Ohio U.S.
- Education: Shimer College; School of the Art Institute of Chicago; Parsons Paris
- Occupation: New media artist

Shawné Michaelain Holloway (born 1991) is a Chicago-based American new media artist and digital feminist whose practice incorporates sound, performance, poetry, and installation with focuses in new media art, feminist art, net art, digital art. Holloway engages with the rhetoric of technology and sexuality to excavate the hidden architectures of power structures and gender norms.

== Early life and education ==
Holloway was born in Wright-Patterson Air Force Base in Ohio.

From 2008 to 2010, Holloway attended Shimer College where she studied social science. In 2013, Holloway received a B.F.A. in studio art from the School of the Art Institute of Chicago. In 2016, Holloway received an M.F.A. in design and technology from Parsons Paris. Holloway is a professor of Kinetic Imaging at the Virginia Commonwealth University School of the Arts.

== Career ==
Alongside her art practice, Holloway is also a teacher in the New Arts Journalism and Film Video New Media and Animation departments at the School of the Art Institute of Chicago (SAIC), The New School, a sex educator teaching classes and writing about intersectional approaches to exploring kinks, and the founder of STRAPP, a design collaborative that re-imagines adult novelty products. She has spoken and exhibited work internationally in spaces like The New School and Eyebeam in New York, Helsinki’s Sorbus Galleria, and ICA London, as well as the Museum of Contemporary Art Chicago. Her work has been acknowledged by sector experts such as Rhizome (organization) and Holloway has been invited to numerous national and international artist-in-residence programs, such as Lean Artist, and curator-in-residence programs, including the dgtl fmnsm festival in Dresden, Germany in 2018.

== Selected works ==
- text(s) to screen (2015): Holloway’s series of digital collages addresses charged themes of desire, rejection, and abuse in the age of ubiquitous online dating. Part of a presentation at Fotomuseum Winterthur in 2019, the curator wrote about the series: "Holloway creates highly charged digital collages by placing excerpts from instant-messaging chats with lovers alongside images that could be from the world of advertising, stock photo databanks or Word ClipArt. Viewers are drawn into a fictional quest for traces – be they erotic, ironic, or aggressive – that brings no conclusive interpretation of the scenes portrayed."
- Chambers Series (2017–present): An ongoing series of performance scores and their partner publication, Chamber Series explores the dynamics of BDSM acts and, in particular, puppy play (or animal roleplay). Inspired, in part, by Donna Haraway’s book The Companion Species Manifesto: Dogs, People, and Significant Otherness, the publications "ask readers to consider how proximity, deprivation, yearning, generosity, and need guide and manipulate our relationships to others."
- Extreme Submission (2017): A series developed during Holloway's time in Paris, working on her Masters at The New School, Parsons School of Design, Extreme Submission (2016) is a project that deals with her identity as a queer woman of color in the BDSM community. As described by Sandra Song in an article for Paper Magazine, the project is composed of three separate works ("Extreme Submission Validated," "Preritual Status" and "Using Tools That Use You"), and "addresses ideas surrounding power dynamics, sexuality and intimacy -- and how it all fits into the endless creative possibilities of the Internet."
- Sub Not Slave (2017): is a multimedia installation that creatively re-stages a sex club bathroom to guide the viewer into an examination of the power that exists between bodies and within interpersonal, sexual relationships. In an interview about the project on AQNB, Holloway explained about the exhibition "I placed them [the audience] in the dominant moral position, but enticed them to do what I wanted. I topped from the bottom. But really, it is all a mirror. When you look down at me, you look down at yourself."
- STRAPP: As a part of LEAN ARTIST, the world's first seed accelerator for artists founded by Jeremy Bailey, STRAPP was created in Fall 2017 as a hybrid performance / product design experiment under the guidance of an international team of mentors and later exhibited at the Museum of Contemporary Art, Chicago. Strapp is an ongoing project to initiate a step forward for queer sexuality. From the website: "shawné michaelain founded Strapp to evolve the narrative of sexuality for a new generation of individuals seeking confidence and comfort without compromise." The project was covered by Vice Magazine in 2019; in the interview Holloway explained “My practice is about examining the tools with which we communicate, what powers go into designing those tools, and how design impacts us while we're using them.”

== Selected exhibitions ==
- 2013: The Photographic Self, Woman Made Gallery, New York
- 2015: Real Live Online, New Museum, New York
- 2015-2019: States of Incarceration, Traveling / The New School, Humanities Action Lab
- 2017: Post-Cyber Feminist International, Institute of Contemporary Arts (ICA), London
- 2018: A Recollection. Predicated. Julius Eastman : that which is fundamental, The Kitchen, New York
- 2018: Strings: Data and the Self, California Museum of Art Thousand Oaks, Thousand Oaks, California
- 2018: All Used Up, International Center of Photography, New York
- 2018: I Was Raised On The Internet, Museum of Contemporary Art, Chicago, Chicago
- 2019: A Field of Meaning, Callicoon Fine Arts, New York
- 2019: Artists Shorts, Neon Digital Arts Festival, Dundee, Scotland
- 2019: Cam Life, Museum of Sex, New York
- 2019: SITUATIONS/Foto Text Data, Fotomuseum Winterthur, Winterthur, Switzerland
- 2019: Refiguring the Future, curated by Heather Dewey-Hagborg and Dorothy R. Santos, 205 Hunter Art Gallery, New York
- 2019: Sunday Service, Knockdown Center, New York
- 2020: dgtl fmnsm HOT MESS, Hebbel am Ufer (HAU), Berlin, Germany
