= Abby Kasonik =

American painter

- Born: Charlottesville, Virginia
- Education: VCU School of the Arts
- Style: Painting
- Website: www.abbykasonik.com

Abby Kasonik is an American painter born in Charlottesville, Virginia.

Kasonik attended Stuart Hall School in Staunton, Virginia and completed her studies at VCU School of the Arts with a degree in sculpture. "Charlottesville artist Abby Kasonik has quickly established a reputation around the country for her sublimely meditative paintings." Her work tends towards enigmatic shadowy figures on a low horizon line, isolated and indistinct, as if seen through a dense fog, or heavy mist. Thin washes of color produce a veil of thick and thin drips, giving solidarity to the atmospheric space. Her paintings are "From the abstract to distinct, each painting utilizes... contemplative colors to create dreamlike vignettes."

Over time, and with atmospheric changes in light, paintings reveal subtle shifts in color and tone. A result of the many layers of underpainting, overpainting and glazes, this is the work's unique quality of depth. Depth is a key element in the pieces, as Kasonik plays with pictorial depth in the visual field of each painting. Her paintings offer the familiar landscape, but present it as confounding and quixotic, such that the viewer may never clearly define the narrative. Kasonik’s "terrains are devoid of life. Man made objects may be present, a railroad track or fence posts, but nothing animate moves; nothing grows." Her body of work "emphasizes the infinity of space and engenders a sense of contemplative peace."

Kasonik's paintings are inspired by water and science; her "over-sized paintings feature layers of acrylic paint on canvas in evocative shades of blues and grays." "Drawn to aquariums, Abby's work is heavily influenced by water and dimension. From the abstract to distinct, each painting utilizes calming contemplative colors to create dreamlike vignettes. Her process, which entails various and repetitive coats of acrylic paint and water, is incredibly laborious." Kasonik continues to create and show her art throughout the country.
