= Ana Ines Barragan King =

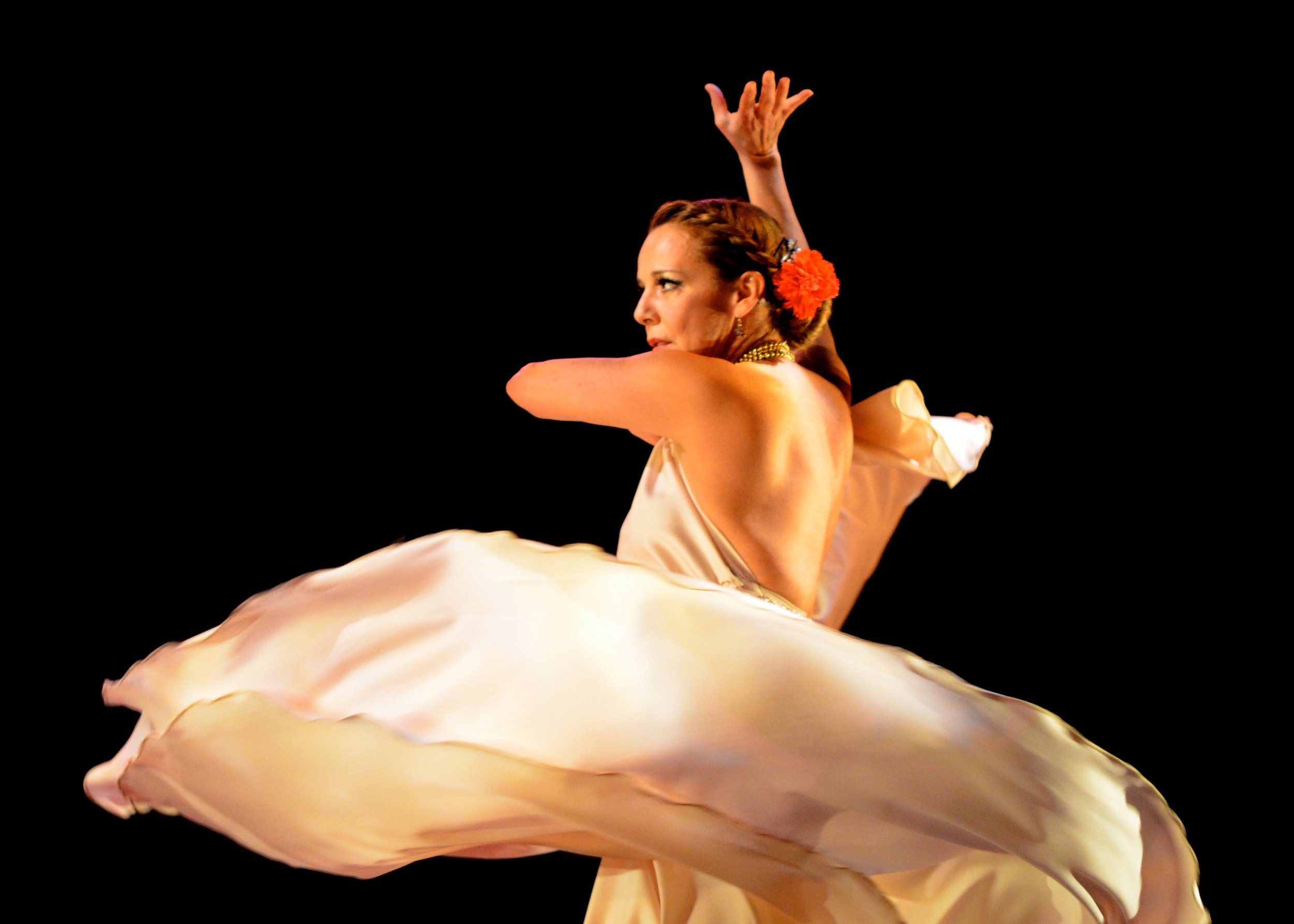
Ana Ines King in El Pintor

Ana Ines Barragan King (born 1957 in Bucaramanga, Colombia) is the founder of the Latin Ballet of Virginia. She is a professional dancer and choreographer. King was a 2016 honoree of Virginia Women in History.

== Education ==
Ana Ines Barragan King attended the Instituto Departmental de Bellas Artes of Colombia, where she earned a BFA in dance and choreography. After moving to Richmond, she studied dance at Virginia Commonwealth University, later joining the faculty in VCU School of the Arts.

== Dance career and formation of dance company ==
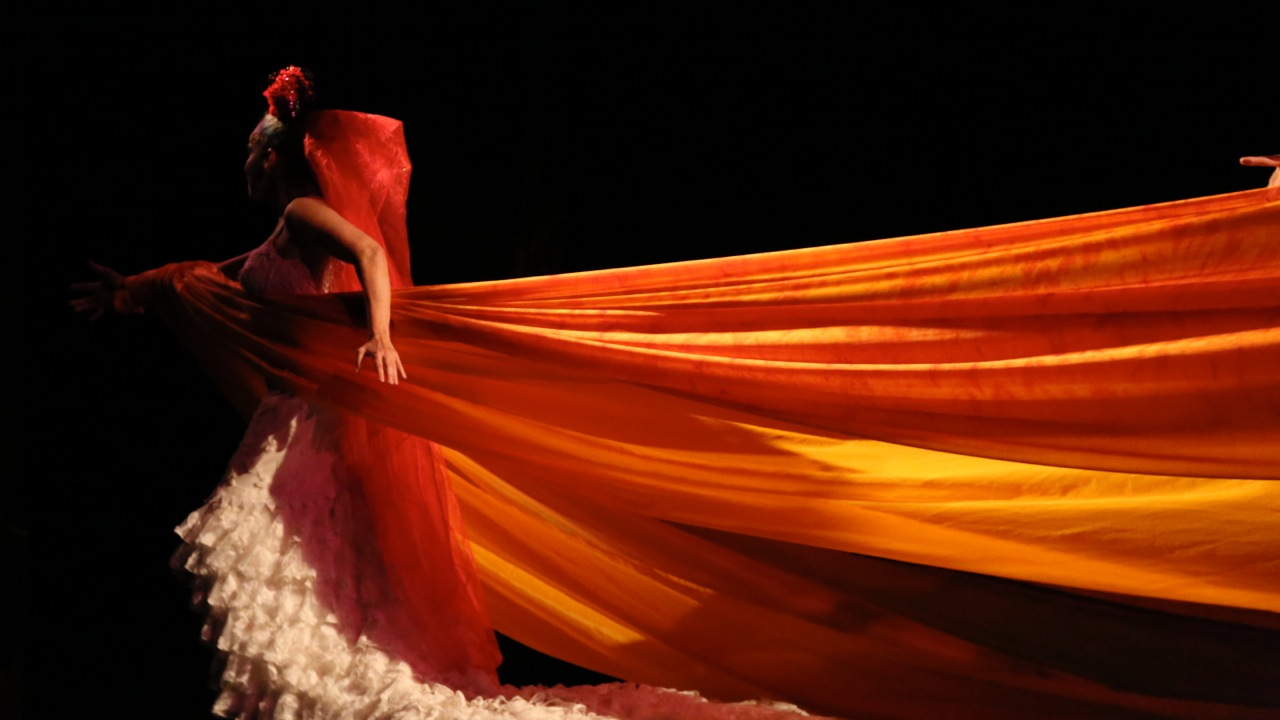
Ana Ines King in El Beso de la Abeja

In Colombia, King founded and was Artistic Director of the Santander Ballet from 1985 to 1995. She was a faculty member at Virginia Commonwealth University department of Dance and Choreography and at the Center for the Arts of Henrico County for seven years. She coordinates and directs the Latin Ballet in collaboration with Dominion Arts Center educational programs.

In addition to directing the Latin Ballet professional company, she is full-time choreographer/producer for the Latin Ballet of Virginia programs and productions.

== Honors and awards ==
In 2015, King received an Outstanding Woman of the Year Award presented by the YWCA. In 2016, she was honored as a Virginia Woman in History by the Library of Virginia. In 2017, King was named "Person of the Year" by the Richmond Times-Dispatch for her work as founder of the Latin Ballet of Virginia. Also in 2017, she was recognized by Style Weekly Women in the Arts for her contributions.

== Teaching ==
King was formerly a member of the faculty of Virginia Commonwealth University's School of the Arts. She teaches and choreographs award-winning dance pieces, including the annual Legend of the Poinsettia, which in 2016 featured among its dancers Frances Wessells. Included in the classes taught by Ana King are master classes in dance taught by invitation at Virginia arts councils, cultural organizations, and colleges.

The Latin Ballet Company of Virginia's educational programs taught by King include subjects such as "Spanish through Dance" about Hispanic language/culture, "Dance as Therapy" for special-needs children, "ELL (ESL) through Dance" with a goal of assimilating international children/families, and "EveryBody Reads!" which is a literacy program. CultureWorks of Richmond teamed with the Richmond Better Housing Coalition to identify three culturally underserved communities that could benefit from an arts and culture experience. One of the results was a Fiesta Del Sol event featuring King's Latin Ballet of Virginia at Winchester Green in North Chesterfield County in Virginia.
