= Whitney Lynn =

American artist

- Born: Maricopa County, Arizona, U.S.

Academic background
- Education: Virginia Commonwealth University (BFA); San Francisco Art Institute (MFA)

Academic work
- Discipline: Art
- Sub-discipline: Visual art Sculpture; Performance art
- Institutions: University of Washington

Whitney Lynn is an American contemporary artist and academic. Much of her work is sculptural and performance-based, incorporating found objects and materials from various cultural and historical sources. Her work deals with topics of boundaries and containment, issues of power and control, concepts of perception and value, and relationships of art history and vernacular forms.

== Early life and education ==
Lynn was born on Williams Air Force Base in Maricopa County, Arizona. She earned a Bachelor of Fine Arts from the VCU School of the Arts in 2004 and Master of Fine Arts from the San Francisco Art Institute.

== Career ==
She has taught at Stanford University and is currently an Associate Professor in New Genres at the University of Washington.

Lynn created the roadside attraction Atomic Open House, produced by Black Cube Nomadic Art Museum, and has produced exhibitions, installations, performances, and artist-led participatory projects for the de Young Museum, The Neon Museum, San Diego International Airport, and the Internet Archive.
