= Caitlin Cherry =

American painter

- Born: 1987 (age 38–39); Chicago, Illinois, U.S.
- Education: School of the Art Institute of Chicago, Columbia University
- Known for: Painting Sculpture

Caitlin Cherry (born 1987) is an African-American painter, sculptor, and educator.

== Early life and education ==
Caitlin Cherry was born in 1987 in Chicago, Illinois. Cherry received her MFA degree from Columbia University School of the Arts in 2012; and her BFA degree from the School of the Art Institute of Chicago in 2010. She also participated in the Yale University Summer School of Art in Norfolk, Connecticut in 2009. Caitlin is the younger sibling of Academy Award winning film director, writer, producer, and former NFL player, Matthew A. Cherry.

Caitlin Cherry: Sapiosexual Leviathan, 2018, oil on canvas, 72½ inches square

== Art and career ==
As of 2025, Cherry serves as Assistant Professor of Painting and Drawing at School of the Art Institute of Chicago. Formerly, Cherry served as Assistant Professor at Virginia Commonwealth University's Department of Painting and Printmaking since 2020. In 2021, Cherry formed a virtual, alternative arts education program entitled Dark Study, along with artist Nicole Maloof. The program seeks to offset the hierarchical structure in universities while addressing racial and economic inequities.

Cherry's work explores different topics, including the representation and visibility of black women as they relate to institutional power structures and security. She uses mixed techniques to do her work, combining sculpture, installation, and painting.

== Exhibitions ==
Cherry has presented in various group and solo exhibitions. Her 2019 exhibition, Thread Ripper at Luis De Jesus gallery in Los Angeles received positive reviews in Art in America and Artillery Magazine. Other notable exhibitions include, Monster Energy at the University of Massachusetts, Amherst in 2017, and Hero Safe at the Brooklyn Museum in 2013, which consisted of three painting-installations for the Raw/Cooked project. Raw/Cooked was a series of projects by Brooklyn artists who have been invited by the Museum to show their first major museum exhibitions. She was the ninth solo artist in the series. She was inspired to build large-scale wooden weapons, based on drawings of Leonardo da Vinci, that act as supports for her paintings, such as Dual Capable Catapult Artcraft "Your Last Supper, Sucker," 2013.

Her work has also been the subject of solo exhibitions at Providence College Galleries, Providence, RI (2018); Anderson Gallery at Virginia Commonwealth University, Richmond, VA (2018); University Museum of Contemporary Art at University of Massachusetts, Amherst, MA (2017); and at The Brooklyn Museum as part of the Raw/Cooked series curated by Eugenie Tsai (2013).

Group exhibitions include Opulence at The Bemis Center for Contemporary Arts, Omaha, NE (2022); Black Femme: Sovereign of WAP and the Virtual Realm at Canada Gallery, NYC (2021); A Wild Ass Beyond: ApocalypseRN (2018) at Performance Space, New York; Punch (2018) curated by Nina Chanel Abney at Jeffrey Deitch, New York; Touchstone (2018) at American Medium, New York; The Sun is Gone but We Have the Light (2018) at Unclebrother/Gavin Brown's Enterprise, Hancock, NY; Soul Recordings at Luis De Jesus Los Angeles; Object[ed]: Shaping Sculpture in Contemporary Art (2016) at UMOCA, Salt Lake City, UT; Banksy's Dismaland Bemusement Park (2015) in Weston-super-Mare, UK; This is What Sculpture Looks Like (2014) at Postmasters Gallery, New York; and Fore (2012) at the Studio Museum in Harlem, New York.

She was included in the 2019 traveling exhibition Young, Gifted, and Black: The Lumpkin-Boccuzzi Family Collection of Contemporary Art.

In July and August 2020, Los Angeles' Luis De Jesus gallery presented Corps Sonore, an online/virtual exhibition of Cherry's paintings and digital collages.

== Awards and fellowships ==
- Robert Rauschenberg Foundation Fellowship Residency (2016).
- Leonore Annenberg Fellowship (2015).
- Lotos Foundation Fellowship (2012).
- Ellen Battel Stoeckel Fellowship, Yale University (2009).
