= Richard Carlyon =

American artist (1930–2006)

- Born: October 1, 1930; Dunkirk, New York, U.S.
- Died: January 20, 2006 (aged 75)
- Education: Richmond Professional Institute (BFA, MFA)
- Spouse: Eleanor Rufty
- Awards: VCU Presidential Medal

Richard Carlyon (October 1, 1930 – January 20, 2006) was an American artist who lived in Richmond, Virginia and taught at Virginia Commonwealth University's School of the Arts, where he became a professor emeritus.

Carlyon gained national recognition for his teaching at VCU. He received the 1993 Distinguished Teaching of Art Award from The College Art Association of America; two professional fellowships from the Virginia Museum of Fine Arts; the 28th Annual Theresa Pollak multimedia prize by Richmond Magazine; and the 2005 VCU Presidential Medal of Honor.

== Biography ==
Richard Carlyon was born on October 1, 1930, in Dunkirk, New York. He graduated with a Bachelor of Fine Arts in 1953 and a Master of Fine Arts in 1963 from the Richmond Professional Institute.

Carylon taught at Virginia Commonwealth University's School of the Arts and at Richmond Professional Institute. He received three fellowships from the Virginia Museum of Fine Arts in painting, drawing, and video. He received a fellowship from the Virginia Commission for the Arts in drawing.

Carlyon married artist Eleanor Rufty, who taught at the Virginia Museum of Fine Arts Studio School. The couple were said to have "influenced a generation of artists studying in Virginia." A YouTube video of Carlyon, Rufty, and gallery owner Beverly Reynolds shows Carlyon receiving the VCU Presidential Medal. He had a son Jason Anderson. He died of cancer on January 20, 2006.

== Exhibitions ==
Carlyon was given posthumous retrospective exhibitions at Anderson Gallery, VCU, Reynolds Gallery, Visual Arts Center of Richmond, and 1708 Gallery.

Carlyon's art is represented in the Jack Blanton Collection at Longwood Center for the Visual Arts.

The Virginia Museum of Fine Arts includes in its collection “A Screwing,” 1995, by Richard Carlyon. This work is made of wood, hinges and screws, is approximately 4-1/2 by 8 feet in size, and was a gift of Jean and Robert Hobbs of Richmond, Virginia. In 2010 his art was shown at Washington and Lee University in Lexington, Virginia.

Carlyon was one of the artists whose book art was displayed in the exhibition BookArt@Artspace curated by Michael Pierce at Artspace in Richmond, Virginia. His work has been shown in solo and group exhibitions regionally and nationally, at venues including 1708 Gallery in Richmond, The Anderson Gallery at Virginia Commonwealth University, The Studio Gallery in Washington, D.C., and the Nexus Gallery in Philadelphia. In New York City, his art has been exhibited at the Fleischmann Gallery, the March Gallery, and the Siegel Gallery.

Blackbird, an online journal of literature and the arts, posted multiple interviews with Carlyon. In 2002, its editor Mary Flinn chatted with Carlyon in the Blackbird editorial office at Virginia Commonwealth University. They discussed the origin of Flight Song, the influence of John Cage, and "the use of video in art, to the state of art as we move into the twenty-first century." Flinn visited with Richard Carlyon again in 2006 to discuss his retrospective show at the Reynolds Gallery in Richmond, Virginia. In that interview, they discussed the importance of placement of the paintings and drawings in the gallery space, the relationship of dance and painting, and other issues surrounding Carlyon's work and process.

Reviewer Edwin Slipek in his STYLE theatre article, "The Long Goodbye", used the subtitle "The late Richard Carlyon set the bar for artistic exploration, integrity and influence".

In January and February 2018, both Reynolds Gallery and the Virginia Commonwealth University Cabell Library honored Carlyon with retrospective exhibitions and viewings of projected images of his films. A panel discussion on Carlyon's exhibition A Network of Possibilities was moderated by curator Ashley Kistler and featured artist and art critic Paul Ryan, art historian Howard Risatti, and art conservator Scott Nolley.
