= Lester Van Winkle =

American sculptor living in Virginia

Lester Gordon Van Winkle is an American sculptor living in Virginia.

== Education ==
In 1967-09 Van Winkle earned a Master in Arts degree, University of Kentucky, Lexington, Kentucky. In 1964-67 he studied for his Bachelor of Science Degree, East Texas State University, Commerce, Texas, with a major in art and a minor in history following study 1962-64 at Del Mar College, Corpus Christi, Texas.

== Academic appointments ==
Lester Van Winkle served on the faculty of Virginia Commonwealth University's School of the Arts for over 35 years and served as chair of the Sculpture Department in his last year before retiring. He was awarded tenure in 1975, became an associate professor in 1978, and a full professor in 1985.

== Awards ==
Van Winkle received a 1995 commission from Virginia Commonwealth University School of Business to create a sculpture award for Richard Holder, CEO, Reynolds Metals, who was occupant of the Thalhimer Chair in the School of Business at VCU. In 1994 and 1992 he received VCU Faculty Grants-in-Aid and was awarded the Virginia Atelier for summer residency at Cite Internationale des Arts, Paris.

== Exhibitions and collections ==
His sculpture Rocker with Cactus is in the collection of the Smithsonian American Art Museum.

Exhibitions of art by Lester Van Winkle include in 1980 Flat Stuff Paintings, Main Art Gallery, Richmond, Virginia. Titles such as "All My Shirts Are Green" show the humor and idiosyncrasy of his art. In 1984 he presented: The Watermelon Show, a group show at Willard Lee Gallery, Richmond. Solo Exhibition, Siegal Contemporary Art, New York, New York. Solo Exhibition, Reynolds-Minor Gallery, Richmond.

In 1985 he exhibited: Solo Exhibition, Henri Gallery; Still Life, group show, Peninsula Fine Arts Center, Newport News, Virginia; Objects, group show, Reynolds-Minor Gallery; Atypical Still Life, group show, at Second Street Gallery, Charlottesville, Virginia; and Fifteen Contemporary Sculptors, at the Peninsula Fine Arts Center.

In 1986 he participated in Line Drives: The Baseball Art Show, group exhibition, Cooperstown, New York and in the Whitney Biennial.

== Biography ==
Born in Texas in 1944, he lives in Deltaville, Virginia with his wife Donna Van Winkle. His sculpture is in many public and private collections, including the Virginia Museum of Fine Arts and the Smithsonian American Art Museum in Washington, D.C..
