= Reni Gower =

American artist and curator

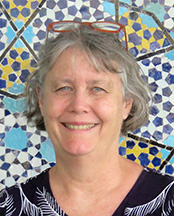
- Born: United States
- Known for: Painting
- Website: renigower.com

Reni Gower is an American artist and curator working in the media of painting, installation, printmaking, papermaking, collage, and papercutting.

== Recognition ==
Gower's art has been exhibited and collected internationally at venues including VCU's Qatar Gallery, and the International Museum of Art & Science.

She received a College Art Association Distinguished Teaching Award in 2014. and a Pollock-Krasner Foundation grant in 2020.
