= Ayanah Moor =

American conceptual artist

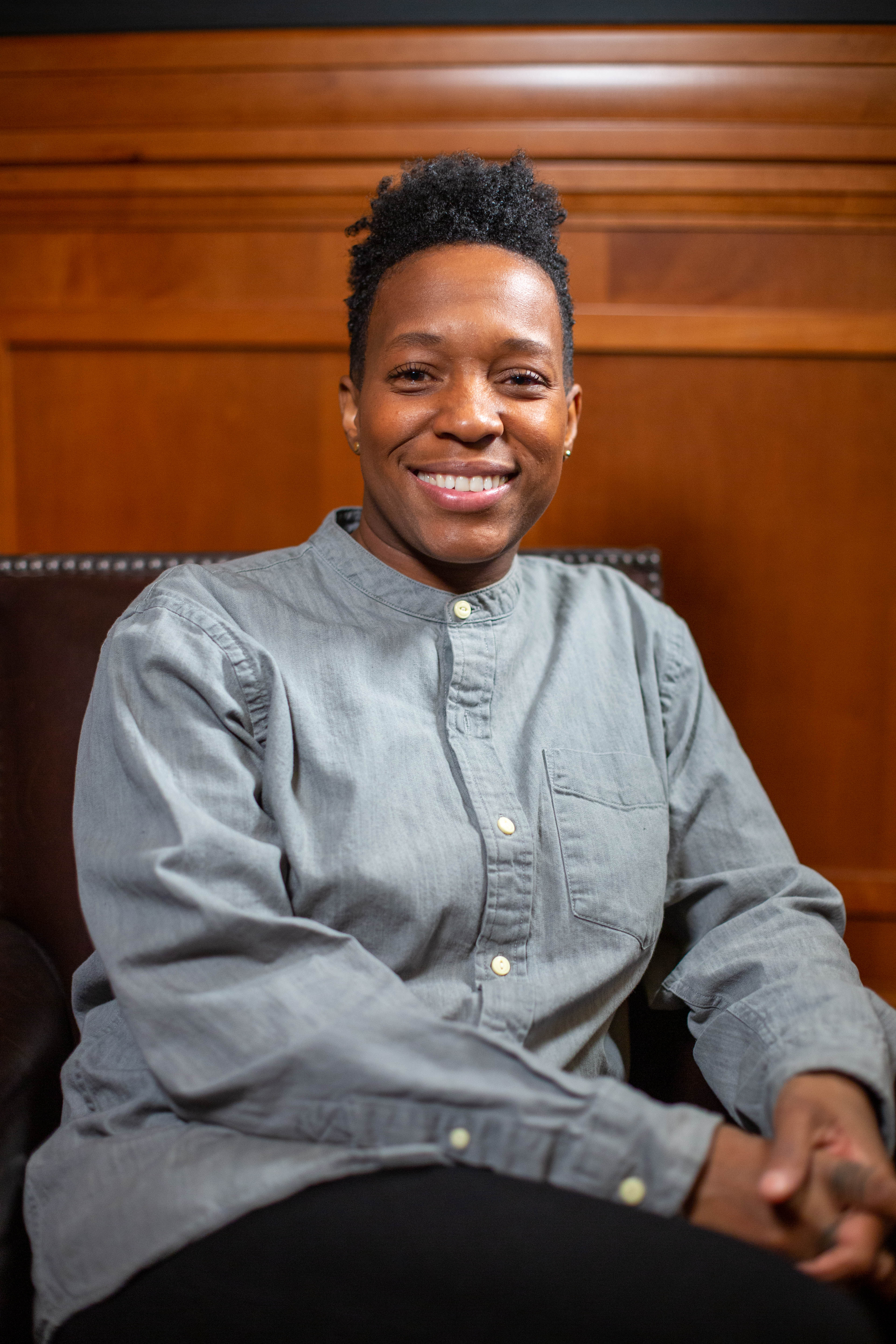
- Born: 1973 (age 52–53); Norfolk, Virginia, U.S.
- Education: Virginia Commonwealth University (BA), Tyler School of Art and Architecture (MFA)
- Occupations: Conceptual artist, professor

Ayanah Moor (born 1973, Norfolk, Virginia, United States) is an American conceptual artist and educator. She works in printmaking, video art, mixed media art, and performance art. Her work addresses contemporary popular culture by interrogating identity and vernacular aesthetics. Much of her works center on hip-hop culture, American politics, black vernacular and gender performance.

== Education and teaching ==
Moor received an MFA degree in printmaking from Tyler School of Art and Architecture at Temple University in Philadelphia in 1998, and a BFA degree in painting and printmaking from Virginia Commonwealth University, Richmond, Virginia in 1995.

Moor is an associate professor in the Department of Printmedia, at School of the Art Institute of Chicago, Chicago, Illinois. Her prior appointment was at Carnegie Mellon University in Pittsburgh.

== Artworks ==
Moor has described her work as examining how popular culture reflects social identities and power structures. She has noted that she aims to appropriate and revise existing material to invert and expand meaning.

== Selected projects ==
She exhibited her work alongside Krista Franklin at the Produce Mode Gallery in Chicago in 2017, in a show entitled Quiet Storm. In 2015, Moor's collaboration with Jasmine Hearn was included in Flow at the Studio Museum in Harlem. Flow was the fourth in the F-Series exhibitions at the Studio Museum. The piece is a performance artwork that translates drawing into sound and sound into movement. Flow is a response to the 1982 collaboration of Bill T. Jones and Keith Haring, Long Distance. Thanks For The Race [2014]: Thanks For The Race (with various participants), performance work incorporating wood, mats, rocks; ACRE Residency, Steuben, WI Queer & Brown in Steeltown [2013-12]: (collaboration with Raquel Rodriguez) podcast & blog project The Pittsburgh Passion Project, Independent Women's Football League [2009]: Pittsburgh, PA Still [2006]: "Still" is a series of photographs that address how women are represented in contemporary rap music videos

== Awards ==
In 2015, Moor received a Hyde Park Art Center Jackman Goldwasser Residency, Chicago, IL. In 2014, she received The Pittsburgh Foundation, Advancing Black Arts in Pittsburgh Award ($7,500). In 2011, she was awarded a STUDIO for Creative Inquiry fellowship at Carnegie Mellon University. In 2011, The Pittsburgh Foundation awarded Moor an Advancing Black Arts in Pittsburgh Award. In 2003, she received a Mid Atlantic Arts Foundation—Creative Fellowship Award and The Pittsburgh Foundation, Artist Award, Pittsburgh, PA. In 2002, Moor was awarded a Berkman Faculty Development Fund Grant, Carnegie Mellon University.

== Permanent collections ==
Moor released works the following collections: Soho House Art Collection, 76 Dean Street, London, UK, Milton and Nancy Washington, Pittsburgh, PA, Proyecto ‘ace, Buenos Aires, Argentina, Agency of Unrealized Projects, e-flux and Serpentine Gallery, London, UK, Bernard A. Zuckerman Museum of Art, Kennesaw, GA, The Block Museum of Art, Northwestern University, Evanston, IL, Mid Atlantic Arts Foundation, Baltimore, MD, Erie Art Museum, Erie, PA, David L. Lawrence Convention Center, Pittsburgh, PA, Foreland Street Studio Archives, Pittsburgh, PA, EGRESS Press and Research Archives, Edinboro, PA, Blue Mountain Center, Blue Mountain Lake, NY Brandywine Workshop, Philadelphia, PA, Tyler School of Art, Philadelphia, PA

== Solo exhibitions ==
- 2013 Ayanah Moor, Welch Galleries, Georgia State University, Atlanta, Georgia
- 2012 New Drawings, Braddock Carnegie Library, Braddock, Pennsylvania
- 2011 Shift: Cambio, Poliglota Room, Proyecto ‘ace, Buenos Aires, Argentina
- 2011 Good News, 707 Penn Gallery, Pittsburgh, Pennsylvania
- 2009 Souljah Sotomayor, Urban Institute for Contemporary Arts, Grand Rapids, Michigan
- 2007 (W)RAPPER, Kipp Gallery, Indiana University of Pennsylvania, Indiana, Pennsylvania
- 2007 Our Radio is Bigger than Yours, Rice Gallery, McDaniel College, Westminster, Maryland
- 2006 Still, Jewett Arts Center, Wellesley College, Wellesley, Massachusetts
- 2006 Still, John Hope Franklin Center, Duke University, Durham, North Carolina
- 2005 Ayanah Moor, A+D 11th Street Gallery, Columbia College, Chicago, Illinois
- 2003 A to Z Like Me, Anchor Graphics, Chicago, Illinois
- 2003 Recent Work, Women's Studio Workshop Gallery, Rosendale, New York
