= Hannah Altman =

American photographer (born 1995)

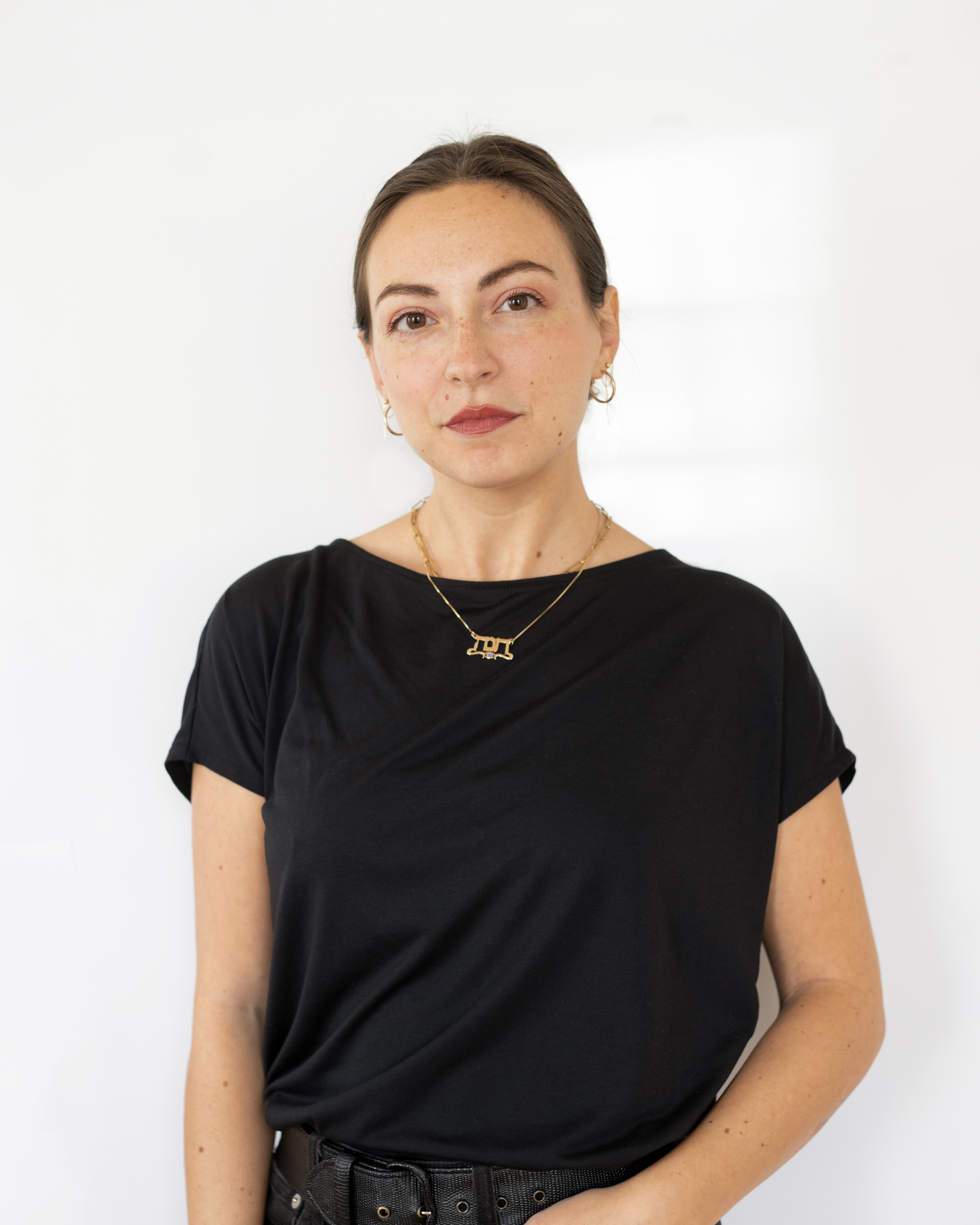
- Altman in 2022
- Born: May 1, 1995 (age 31)
- Education: Hunterdon Central Regional High School; Point Park University (BFA); Virginia Commonwealth University (MFA)
- Occupation: Photographer

Hannah Altman (born May 1, 1995) is an American photographer from New Jersey. Her artwork explores lineage, memory, ritual, and storytelling. She is known for her use of natural light and incorporating aspects of Jewish culture into her work.

== Life ==
A graduate of Hunterdon Central Regional High School, Altman grew up in the Ringoes section of East Amwell Township, New Jersey, United States. She is Jewish of Ashkenazi descent. She started photographing as a child in response to her severe nearsightedness. She graduated from with a BFA degree in photography from Point Park University in Pittsburgh, Pennsylvania, in 2017 and an MFA in Photography and Film from Virginia Commonwealth University in Richmond, Virginia, in 2020. As of 2023, she is based in Boston, Massachusetts.

== Career ==
Since 2015, Altman has made the project Indoor Voices, a series of portraits made with her mother.

In 2015, when Altman was a 19-year-old student at Point Park University, she posted the photo series And Everything Nice to her Tumblr page featuring bodily fluids replaced with glitter as a critique of female beauty standards. The project garnered significant media attention, with features including Buzzfeed, Huffington Post, Vanity Fair, and Cosmopolitan. She had her first solo show in 2016 at The Lantern Gallery in Pittsburgh, Pennsylvania, which explored themes of feminism and community.

In 2018, as an MFA student at Virginia Commonwealth University, she began working on Kavana, a photography project that explores Jewish memory, narrative heirlooms, and image making. Kris Graves Projects published a photobook of this work in 2020, which has been collected by several libraries, including the MoMa, the Metropolitan Museum of Art, and Harvard University. Curator Francesca Cesari described her work in 2022 as:

"The powerful aesthetic and the profound, symbolic message her works conveys are a fresh, unexpected narrative that immediately leads to a tale of tradition and contemporary. Her poetic language tells us about the Yiddish diaspora through staged portraits, rituals and symbols that re-elaborate old experiences, deeply rooted in the past yet extremely present. There is a kind of silence that flutters through the pictures, we tend to feel the same respect we have in front of a sacred image and at the same time we recognize the tangible sensuality of bodies, with a focus on the female figures. The wonderful use of light and the simple but effective scenes reveal how the experience of exile contain both grief and resilience, a strong identity with a special code that is still relevant today."

Themes of Jewish ritual and storytelling were further demonstrated with solo exhibitions at Blue Sky Gallery in Portland, Oregon in 2020, Filter Photo Chicago, IL in 2021, and Gallery 263 in Cambridge, Massachusetts, in 2022. In 2023, she became the inaugural Blanksteen Artist in Residence at the Slifka Center for Jewish Life at Yale. She was also named an Aperture Portfolio Prize finalist in 2023. In March 2025, she released her second photography book We Will Return to You, published by Saint Lucy Books. The book explores motifs within Jewish folklore, in particular diasporic Yiddish literature, and how those themes can be translated into photographs. The book has been collected by institutions including the Getty Library, the Cleveland Museum of Art, and Princeton University Library. Cultured Magazine included Altman on their Young Photographer's List in 2025.

In 2026, Altman opened the exhibition Ground Glass, a series of photographs creating a speculative history of lens-maker and Holocaust victim Lore Sternfeld (1915-1943). Sternfeld worked for the optical company Astro-Berlin before her deportation to and murder in Auschwitz. The photographs were made using refurbished Pan-Tachar camera lens models, similar to those Sternfeld worked on before her death. Altman imagined Sternfeld's "emotional landscape" during final months of her life. The project spanned her hometown of Berlin, the train route to Auschwitz, and the inside of the former home of Auschwitz commandant Rudolf Höss. The photographs were then installed alongside the vintage lenses in Höss’s former home, which is now owned by the non-profit organization Auschwitz Research Center for Hate, Extremism and Radicalization (ARCHER) at House 88. In Lenscratch, Altman stated that "the project acknowledges the impossibility of filling the gaps, instead focusing on the opportunity to build upon her unknown inner world with empathy and expansiveness.”

== Solo exhibitions ==
- 2016: Intimate Threat, with Josh Escoto. Curated by Krista Wright. Trust Arts Education Center. Pittsburgh, PA.
- 2016: Luminous / Weightless. Lantern Gallery. Pittsburgh, PA.
- 2017: Construct of Viewpoint. Junior High Gallery. Los Angeles, CA.
- 2017: Humanism. The Temple Judea Museum. Elkins Park, PA.
- 2018: Construct of Viewpoint. Union Hall Gallery. Pittsburgh, PA.
- 2020: Kavana. Blue Sky Gallery. Portland, OR.
- 2021: A Permanent Home in the Mouth of the Sun. AAP Exhibition Space. Pittsburgh, PA.
- 2021: A Permanent Home in the Mouth of the Sun. Filter Space. Chicago, IL.
- 2022: With Rifts and Collapses. Gallery 263. Cambridge, MA.
- 2023: We Will Return to You. Abakus Projects. Boston, MA.
- 2025: As It Were, Suspended in Midair, Kniznick Gallery. Brandeis University. Waltham, MA.
- 2025: Hannah Altman | Elinor Carucci, with Elinor Carucci. Koffler Arts. Toronto, ON.
- 2025: We Will Return to You. Candela Gallery. Richmond, VA.
- 2026: Ground Glass. Auschwitz Research Center for Hate, Extremism and Radicalization (ARCHER) at House 88. Oświęcim, PL.
