= Joseph H. Seipel =

American sculptor and conceptual artist

Joseph H. Seipel (died June 12, 2024) was an American sculptor and conceptual artist who was formerly the Dean of the VCU School of the Arts. He was a member of the VCU faculty for over 40 years. As Dean of VCU arts, he also had oversight of the VCU School of the Arts branch in Doha, Qatar. He administered VCU exchange programs with art and design schools in Finland, India, Israel and Korea. He retired in 2016.

== Education ==
Seipel received his B.S. from the University of Wisconsin–Madison in 1970, and his M.F.A. from the Maryland Institute College of Art, Rinehart School of Sculpture in 1973. In an interview by Glenn Harper in Sculpture Magazine, before talking about sculpture and sculpture education, Seipel spoke about his own early education and how it affected his concept of the importance of scale and use of varied materials.

== Teaching and administrative positions ==
When Seipel became chair of the sculpture department at VCU in 1985, succeeding Dean Richard Toscan, the program had been strong for many years, with about 100 VCU-trained sculptors graduating each year. All BFA graduates of the Virginia Commonwealth University's School of the Arts—even though not necessarily sculpture majors—were required to have at least one rigorous class in the sculpture department. Seipel strove to transfer that multi-disciplinary success to the graduate program and to put additional focus on incorporating new technological equipment and training into the education of artists. "All of a sudden the sculpture students were using the same language as engineering students," Seipel said. Named Administrative Dean at the Savannah College of Art and Design in 2011, Seipel returned to Richmond as Dean of the School of the Arts at Virginia Commonwealth University's School of the Arts, a position from which he retired in 2016 and was followed by interim dean, Professor James Frazier. In 2017 Seipel served as the Interim Dean of the School of Art and Design at the Fashion Institute of Technology in New York City. He also served as the Interim Director of the VCU Institute for Contemporary Art.

== Sculpture and exhibitions ==
In 1999 Joe Seipel's biographical installation piece 18,621 Days at 1708 gallery in Richmond received a Critic's Choice award for public art. His exhibition history at 1708 includes 25 x 25 in 2003, 18621 Days (a 1999 solo installation), the Founders’ Exhibition in 1998, and numerous invitational group shows in Richmond, Milan, Italy, New York City, Washington, DC and Norfolk, VA. He participated in the Richmond citywide project 21 Billboards by 21 Artists.

Additional photos and commentary by Seipel are included in a 2016 published history of Virginia Commonwealth University's School of the Arts' Anderson Gallery edited by Ashley Kistler. Seipel's sculpture is conceptual, monumental in scale, and frequently robotic. After retiring in 2016 from his administrative duties at VCU, Seipel was working again in his studio in the Fan district of Richmond, Virginia.

== Gallery and museum affiliations ==
Seipel was a founding board member and first president of 1708 Gallery in Richmond's Shockoe Bottom, now located on West Broad Street, in Richmond's Arts and Cultural District. While working in Savannah, he was the juror for Richmond's 1708 Gallery's 13th Annual SECAC (Southeastern College Art Conference) and MACAA (Mid-Atlantic College Art Association) Juried Exhibition. In 2012 VCU announced plans for a new ICA (Institute for Contemporary Art, Richmond), to be a privately funded signature building for the VCU School of the Arts located at the corner of Broad Street and Belvidere, a busy thoroughfare in the city's art district. In 2014 Seipel and architect Steven Holl participated in the ceremonial groundbreaking for the new Institute of Contemporary Art in Richmond.

== Professional activity and awards ==
Seipel was named top sculpture educator at the 2009 International Sculpture Conference in Philadelphia. Seipel received recognition for lifetime achievement in the 2012 Theresa Pollak Prizes for Excellence in the Arts. In 2016, he was honored by Richmond Magazine as "Richmonder of the Month." He served as an honored member of the International Society of Fine Arts Deans. As Dean of the VCU School of the Arts, in 2014 Seipel oversaw the purchase and transformation of a former Richmond West Broad Street trolley station into a building called The Depot, an art lecture hall, classroom, exhibition, and studio space for students and faculty. He participated as a speaker at the VCU Brandcenter. He was appointed by Virginia Governor Douglas Wilder to the Task Force for Promotion of the Arts and by Governor George Allen to the Virginia Art and Architecture Review Board. The VCU Brand Center produced five Vimeo video interviews with Joseph Seipel, each addressing a different question posed to him. The questions were: 1) What's your process when you start a sculpture? 2) Do you see advertising as an art or a science? 3) Do you think creativity can be learned or are you born with it? 4) How do you know when a piece is finished? and 5) Who do you feel is the most important artist of the past 25 years? Seipel was frequently quoted and interviewed regarding contemporary sculptors and sculpture and about the new Institute for Contemporary Art, Richmond. Following the retirement of the ICA's inaugural director Lisa Frieman from her position at the museum, Seipel was named interim director of the new museum. In December 2018, Seipel was named a Richmond Times Dispatch person of the year for his service to the arts community.

== Personal life ==
Seipel married Suzanne. They had a daughter Chloe. He died of pancreatic cancer on June 12, 2024.
