= Lily Cox-Richard =

American sculptor

- Citizenship: United States Of America
- Education: Virginia Commonwealth University (MFA, 2008); California College of the Arts (BFA, 2001)
- Website: lilycoxrichard.com

Lily Cox-Richard is an American sculptor. Her work engages with the histories of labor, natural resources, the politics of viewership, and paths of resistance. She is an assistant professor of Sculpture and Extended Media at Virginia Commonwealth University.

== Education ==
Cox-Richard received her BFA in Jewelry/Metal Arts from California College of the Arts in 2001 and an MFA in Sculpture and Extended Media from Virginia Commonwealth University in 2008. In the summer of 2009, she attended the Salzburg International Summer Academy of Fine Arts where she studied stone carving and worked at a nearby quarry.

== Work ==
Lily Cox-Richard uses materials and forms to examine cultural histories, questions of value, labor, and stewardship. She often works with industrial and construction materials like concrete, plaster, and metal, alongside organic materials and discarded objects.

From 2010 to 2014 she created a series of work titled, The Stand (Possessing Powers) in which she carved replicas of the support structures found in Hiram Powers's marble figure sculptures. Cox-Richard's sculptures were made with plaster, historically known to be a provisional material used in the study and process of sculpture. In this work, Cox-Richard examined how myths and allegories promoted the sculptural work made in America during the 19th century.

In 2016, Cox-Richard exhibited a work titled Salv. at Artpace in San Antonio, TX. The work was made in response to a trip she took to Big Bend Ranch State Park, TX, where she spotted an asphalt truck that had veered off the road and lodged itself into the landscape. Salv. featured three 1-ton copper bales and a work titled "Thunder Egg" resembling the form of a cracked-open geode, but made from the cast interiors of baskets. The work addressed topics of entropy, stewardship, history, sustainability, and the value placed on landscape.

Cox-Richard’s 2019 exhibition at the Blanton Museum of Art (Austin, TX) titled She Wolf + Lower Figs, was reviewed in ARTnews, Artforum, Hyperallergic and Artnet News. Interested in The Blanton's William J. Battle Collection of Plaster Casts, she integrated the casts into her exhibition to question "their role in perpetuating notions of physical “perfection” and “whiteness” as [an] ideal, " as noted by the Austin Monthly. The casts were draped in synthetic tulle netting and paired with sculptures made by Cox-Richard, such as a multicolored scagliola She-Wolf and a 30 ft-long concrete sidewalk, titled Ramp. Hyperallergic stated, "Lily Cox-Richard: She-Wolf + Lower Figs. questions a long-held association between the aesthetic qualities of classical sculptures with physical whiteness."

Also in 2019, Cox-Richard collaborated with artist Michael Jevon Demps for a show titled, walking with: Library of Radical Returns, exhibited at the Visual Arts Center of Richmond, VA. The project website states that the Library of Radical Returns (LoRR) "is rooted in explorations of shared energy, of lending without concern of eventual return, and the belief that the energy sent out into the world compounds and creates returns greater than any actual object being brought back." Central to LoRR and their collaboration, is a philosophy of “shar[ing] what you have, and tak[ing] what you need.” Their exhibition was made in response to taking walks in Richmond and featured materials collected from the sites they visited along the James River. The exhibition featured rock tumblers, collected stones, river water, clay sourced from the area, photographs, videos, and audio recordings.

In 2022, Cox-Richard opened a monumental solo-exhibition of new work titled, Weep Holes at Mass MoCA (North Adams, MA). While in residence at the Recycled Artists in Residency Program (RAIR) in Philadelphia, PA, she was inspired by a giant bale of tinsel she found among the objects slated for landfill, and how the material transformed from its use in celebrations to trash. The bale and its accompanying short film become the underlying center of the exhibition, all of which reflect her continued interest in materiality, reuse, symbols of care, and how we value the objects around us. The title, Weep Holes, comes from a masonry term that relates to the alleviation of pressure points in brick to allow for water to pass through without rupture. As an expansive series of works, Weep Holes addresses ideas of “stewardship, beauty and threat, collective action, and building and dismantling.”

== Residencies ==
Cox-Richard has attended residencies at Yvonne (a ten-year residency in Guatemala city), Artpace, RAIR in Philadelphia, PA, Millay Colony for the Arts in Austerlitz, NY, MacDowell Colony in Petersborough, NH, The Core Program through the Museum of Fine Arts, Houston, and the John Michael Kohler Arts Center in Sheboygan, WI.

== Awards ==
- 2012 Smithsonian Artist Research Fellowship
- 2015 Houston Artadia Award
- 2019-2020 Virginia Museum of Fine Arts Fellowship

== Exhibitions ==
=== Selected solo exhibitions ===
- 2022 Soft Fists Insist, Hirschl & Adler Modern, New York, NY
- 2021-23 Weep Holes, MASS MoCA, North Adams, MA
- 2019 She-Wolf + Lower Figs., Blanton Museum of Art, Austin, TX
- 2018 Berm, Diverseworks, Houston, TX
- 2018 Sculptures the Size of Hailstones, Old Jail Art Center, Albany, TX
- 2017 If not an hongo // Si no es un mushroom, Yvonne, Guatemala City, Guatemala
- 2016 Salv., Artpace, San Antonio, TX
- 2016 Stringer Lode, She Works Flexible, Houston, TX
- 2014 The Stand (Possessing Powers), Hudson River Museum, Yonkers, NY
- 2014 The Stand (Possessing Powers), Hirschl & Adler Modern, New York, NY
- 2013 Thicket, Institute for the Humanities, University of Michigan, Ann Arbor, MI
- 2013 The Stand (Possessing Powers), Vox Populi, Philadelphia, PA
- 2011 Fruiting Bodies, The Poor Farm, Waupaca County, WI

=== Selected group exhibitions ===
- 2021 Ocean Body, Wasserman Projects, Detroit, MI
- 2021 Our Secret Fire, Hirschl & Adler Modern, New York, NY
- 2021 Active-Intermission-Composite-Artifact (AICA), 1708 Gallery, Richmond, VA
- 2019 walking with: Library of Radical Returns, Visual Arts Center, Richmond, VA
- 2018 Our Going On, Moonmist, Houston, TX
