= Myron Helfgott =

American sculptor

- Born: 1936; Chicago, Illinois, U.S.
- Died: September 25, 2020 (aged 83–84)
- Citizenship: American
- Education: Southern Illinois University
- Known for: Sculpture
- Awards: Theresa Pollak Prize

Myron Helfgott (1936 – September 25, 2020) was an American sculptor and educator known for multimedia works combining sculpture, audio, kinetics, photography, and assemblage. He taught in the Sculpture and Extended Media Department at Virginia Commonwealth University (VCU) from 1968 until his retirement in 2003, serving as the department's acting chair from 2001 to 2003.

== Life and education ==
Helfgott was born in 1936 in Chicago, Illinois. He studied architecture at the University of Illinois from 1954 to 1957, then earned a B.A. in design (1957–60) and an M.F.A. in art (1962–64) from Southern Illinois University. He undertook special studies with the inventor and designer R. Buckminster Fuller in 1957–59 and again in 1962.

Before joining VCU, Helfgott taught at Northern Illinois University (1964–67) and Edinboro State College (1967–68). In 1968 he joined the faculty of the Richmond Professional Institute just as it merged with the Medical College of Virginia to become Virginia Commonwealth University; he taught there until 2003, serving as acting chair of the sculpture department from 2001 to 2003, and became professor emeritus in 2003.

He died on September 25, 2020, survived by his daughter Megan Helfgott.

== Work ==
Helfgott's sculpture incorporated audio, kinetic elements, photography, and assemblage. Critics noted his interest in language and conversation, a sort of skepticism toward the way words misrepresent and digress, producing effects that could be "poetic, ironic, or humorous." In his kinetic and audio works, he sought to introduce time as a variable within visual art: "I was always kind of upset that in the visual arts, the component of time was not part of it. So I started doing kinetic work... I wanted to make time as a variable and a factor within the work."

The art historian and critic Howard Risatti wrote that Helfgott's work explored "the relationship between the solid, tangible reality of the world and abstract, intellectual thought," and that his indifference to art-world trends stemmed from "his attempt to understand the self in relation to a wider world."

Works include Detail (1986), Being Looked After by Ida, Jeri, and Megan (1981–82), Science Fiction/My Anxieties (2006), Buddha Wisdom/What Women Have Told Me (2005–06), Tyranny of the Theoretical (2008), and The Feel of the Thing, Not the Think of It (2008).

== Exhibitions and recognition ==
In 1973 Helfgott's work was included in "Extraordinary Realities," an exhibition organized by the Whitney Museum of American Art that traveled to the Everson Museum of Art and the Contemporary Arts Center. He exhibited internationally in Tokyo, Lima, and Glasgow, and at the Usdan Gallery at Bennington College, the Philadelphia Art Alliance, and the Peninsula Fine Arts Center in Norfolk, Virginia. In 1988 he participated in "Un/Common Ground: Virginia Artists" at the Virginia Museum of Fine Arts.

In 2015, the Anderson Gallery at VCU mounted a retrospective, "Myron Helfgott: An Inventory of My Thoughts," curated by gallery director Ashley Kistler and spanning more than 45 years of work across all three floors of the gallery. The exhibition was reviewed in Sculpture magazine and accompanied by a fully illustrated catalogue published by the Anderson Gallery. In 2022, 1708 Gallery in Richmond presented the posthumous survey "Myron Helfgott: The Ultimate Show," co-curated by his longtime dealer Al Calderaro.

His work is held in the collections of the Chrysler Museum of Art and the Virginia Museum of Fine Arts, among others. He received the Theresa Pollak Prize for Excellence in the Arts from Richmond Magazine (2006), grants from the Virginia Commission for the Arts (1985, 1992), a Virginia Museum of Fine Arts Professional Fellowship (1989), and residencies from the Cité Internationale des Arts in Paris and the Virginia Center for the Creative Arts.
