= Theresa Pollak =

American painter (1899–2002)

- Born: August 13, 1899; Richmond, Virginia, U.S.
- Died: September 18, 2002 (aged 103)
- Alma mater: University of Richmond
- Movement: VCU School of the Arts

Theresa Pollak (August 13, 1899 – September 18, 2002) was an American artist and art educator born in Richmond, Virginia. She was a nationally known painter, and she is largely credited with the founding of Virginia Commonwealth University's School of the Arts. She was a teacher at VCU's School of the Arts between 1928 and 1969. Her art has been exhibited in the Whitney Museum of American Art in New York, the Boston Museum of Fine Art, and the Corcoran Gallery in Washington, D.C. She died at the age of 103 on September 18, 2002 and was given a memorial exhibition at Anderson Gallery of Virginia Commonwealth University.

Theresa Pollak's mature work features a synthesis of figurative and abstract traditions. The subjects of her work include still lifes, landscapes, portraits, and figure studies that are explorations of form, color, and space. According to the artist, “Art is not an imitation of nature, but an artist's reaction to life.” She was most influenced by French post-Impressionists such as Henri Matisse whose work she first encountered at a private gallery exhibition in New York in the 1940s. "That my painting shall be moving in form, vibrantly alive, expressive of myself and of the age in which I live," was the objective of her works. She was a tireless advocate of modern art and the power of artistic expression, writing an article in defense of the exhibition of contemporary American art at the Virginia Museum in 1958.

== Early education ==
After graduating from John Marshall High School, Pollak accepted a scholarship to attend Westhampton College at the University of Richmond, where she earned a B.S. in chemistry in 1921. She was a Phi Beta Kappa graduate, and her alma mater University of Richmond presented Pollak an Honorary Doctorate of Fine Arts on May 13, 1973. Virginia Commonwealth University awarded Pollak with an Honorary Doctorate in the Humanities in 1978.

== Professional study ==
From 1912 to 1917, Theresa Pollak studied at the Richmond Art Club under Adele Clark and Nora Houston. She then received a scholarship to study at the Art Students League of New York from 1921 to 1926 with artists such as modernist Max Weber and in the late 1950s with abstract expressionist Hans Hoffmann in Provincetown, Massachusetts. In 1932, she was awarded a fellowship to the Tiffany Foundation in Oyster Bay, Long Island. In 1933 she was awarded a Carnegie Fellowship at Fogg Museum, Harvard University. In the summer of 1937 she studied at the Steiger Paint Group in Edgartown, Massachusetts. She also studied at the Hans Hoffman School of Painting in Provincetown, Massachusetts in the summer of 1958.

== Founding of the School of Arts ==
In 1928, under Theresa Pollak's leadership, the Art Department at the School of Social Work and Public Health opened, later to become the Richmond Division of the College of William and Mary and later still the Richmond Professional Institute. The first location of the School of Arts was the loft of the Saunders-Willard house stable. From 1928 to 1930 Pollack began teaching children's classes at Richmond Professional Institute as well as classes at the University of Richmond. Student enrollment increased and in 1935, Pollak became a full-time Professor of Art at Richmond Professional Institute (now VCU). By 1948, the School of the Arts included 18 instructors and 500 students with departments of Commercial Art, Fashion Design, and Crafts, Dramatic Art, Interior Decorating, and Fine Arts. In 1969, RPI became Virginia Commonwealth University and Pollak was VCU's first instructor of art. By 1970, the school had expanded into the School of the Arts at Virginia Commonwealth University, today nicknamed VCUarts.

== Educator and artist ==
Theresa Pollack was an influential teacher. Drawing from her experiences studying at the Art Students League in New York, Pollack introduced nude models to her art classes, drawing the ire of "middle class morality." But she believed that study of the nude form was essential to artistic study. As the School of the Arts grew in the number of faculty, departments, and students, Pollack strove to unify VCUarts. She pioneered what is now the Art Foundation Program, which freshman art students are required to complete before entering their specialized department.

Theresa Pollack was represented by the Scott-McKennis Fine Art gallery in Carytown and later at the Reynolds Gallery on East Franklin Street, where over 100 Pollack paintings and drawing were sold.

== Vice-President of the Richmond Artists Association ==
Theresa Pollak was an early member and Vice President of the Richmond Artists Association (RAA) (also known as RAA) from 1958-1959. In 1978, she became a lifetime Honorary Member and was a frequent exhibitor with RAA as long as that organization existed.

== Exhibitions and honors ==
Pollak participated in numerous exhibitions including the Whitney Museum of American Art's First Biennial of Contemporary Painting in 1932 and group exhibitions at Rockefeller Center in New York City in 1936. Annually she participated in the Virginia Museum of Fine Arts' American Painting Biennial and Exhibition of Virginia Artists and The Richmond Scene exhibition at the Valentine Museum. In 1939, she received first prize at the Virginia Museum of Fine Arts' Virginia Artists Biennial. In the 1970s Pollak's art was exhibited at Scott-McKennis Fine Art, a gallery owned by her former student Gail McKennis, and she maintained an upstairs art studio on Thompson Street, between Cary Street and Floyd Avenue. Her art was shown in Richmond Artist Association and Virginia Museum of Fine Arts juried shows, as well as in invitational and curated shows at local venues Reynolds/Minor Gallery, Artspace 1306, Artspace, and Art6 Gallery.

She was the first Richmond artist honored by the Virginia chapter of the Women's Caucus for Art as an "Artist of the Year." In 1951 Mary Baldwin College honored Pollak with a solo show and the Anderson Gallery at Virginia Commonwealth University honored her with a retrospective in 1969. Richmond Magazine named its annual awards for excellence in the arts "Pollak Awards" in her honor. In 1975, she was a participant in Virginia Commonwealth University's Oral History Program.

In 1971, The Pollak Building at the Virginia Commonwealth University's School of the Arts was named for her.

On her 100th birthday, in 1999, Richmond Mayor Tim Kaine issued a letter of proclamation honoring her accomplishments and a commemorative poster, issued by Virginia Commonwealth University, was distributed at more than 20 galleries throughout Richmond. The poster is a reproduction of Pollak's 1930 painting "Maxine".

On May 12, 2015 the Richmond Times Dispatch announced that Virginia Commonwealth University's Anderson Gallery was closed and that the Anderson Gallery Collections, including its holdings of art by Theresa Pollak, would be moved to VCU's James Branch Cabell Library.

The Theresa Pollak Prizes for Excellence in the Arts, so named in her honor, has been awarded by Richmond Magazine to artists associated with the Richmond region since 1998. Honorees have included: Bosnian-born artist Tanja Softić, Professor of Art at the University of Richmond (2012); television writer, producer, and director Vince Gilligan; visual artist Sonya Clark (2014); theater set designer Terrie Moore; and in 2017, painter Thomas Van Auken.

In 2018 the Virginia Capitol Foundation announced that Pollak's name would be included on the Virginia Women's Monument's glass Wall of Honor.

Pollak's works are in the permanent collections of The Virginia Museum of Fine Arts, The Chrysler Museum, the Valentine, Virginia Commonwealth University, and the University of Richmond among others.
