= List of Virginia Commonwealth University alumni =

This article lists notable alumni and students of the Virginia Commonwealth University in Richmond, Virginia.

== Art ==
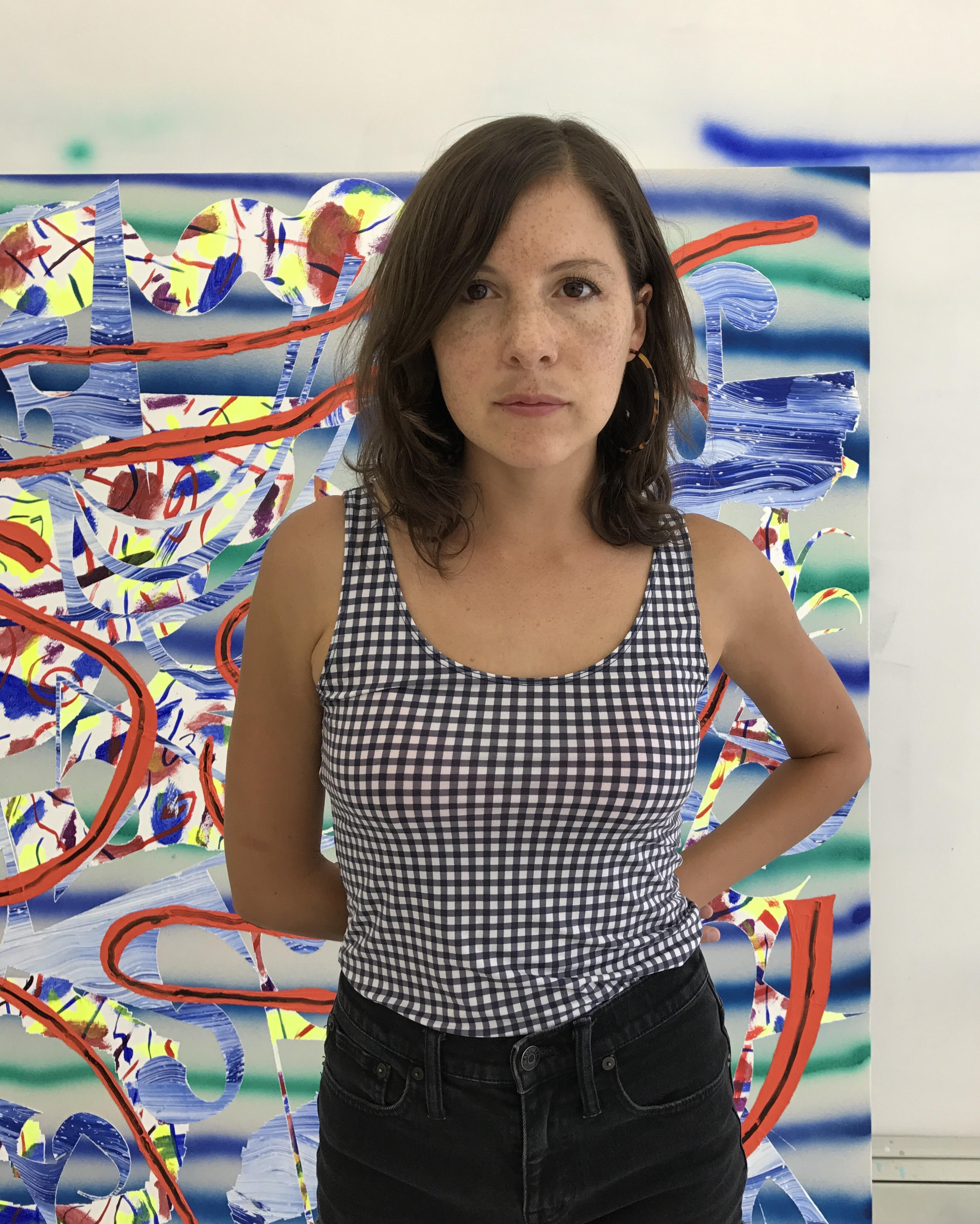
Trudy Benson, abstract painter

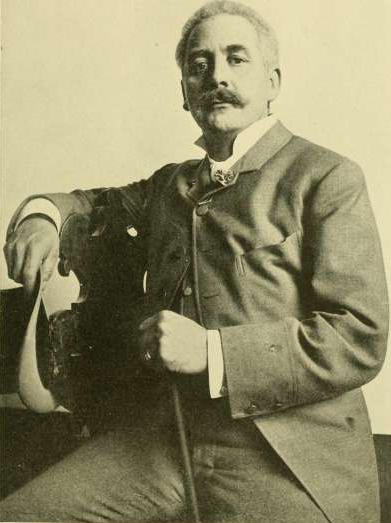
Moses Jacob Ezekiel, sculptor

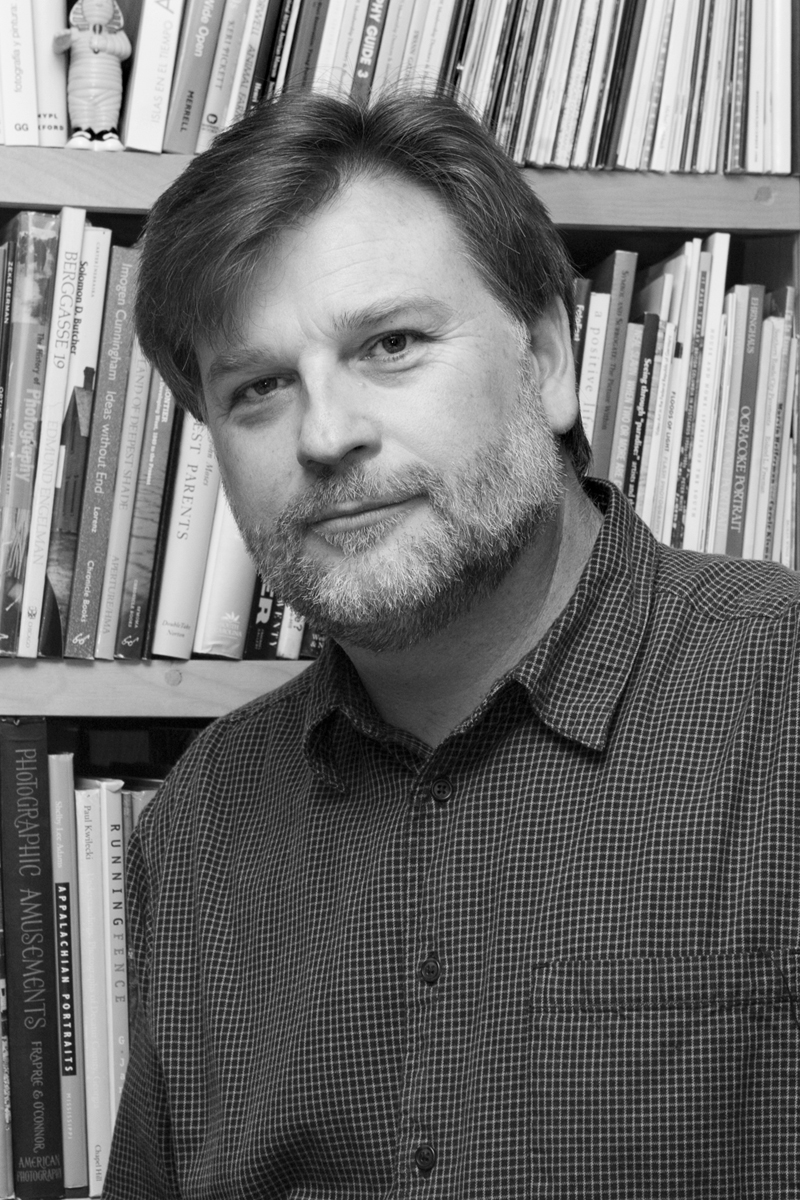
Mark Sloan, curator, author and painter

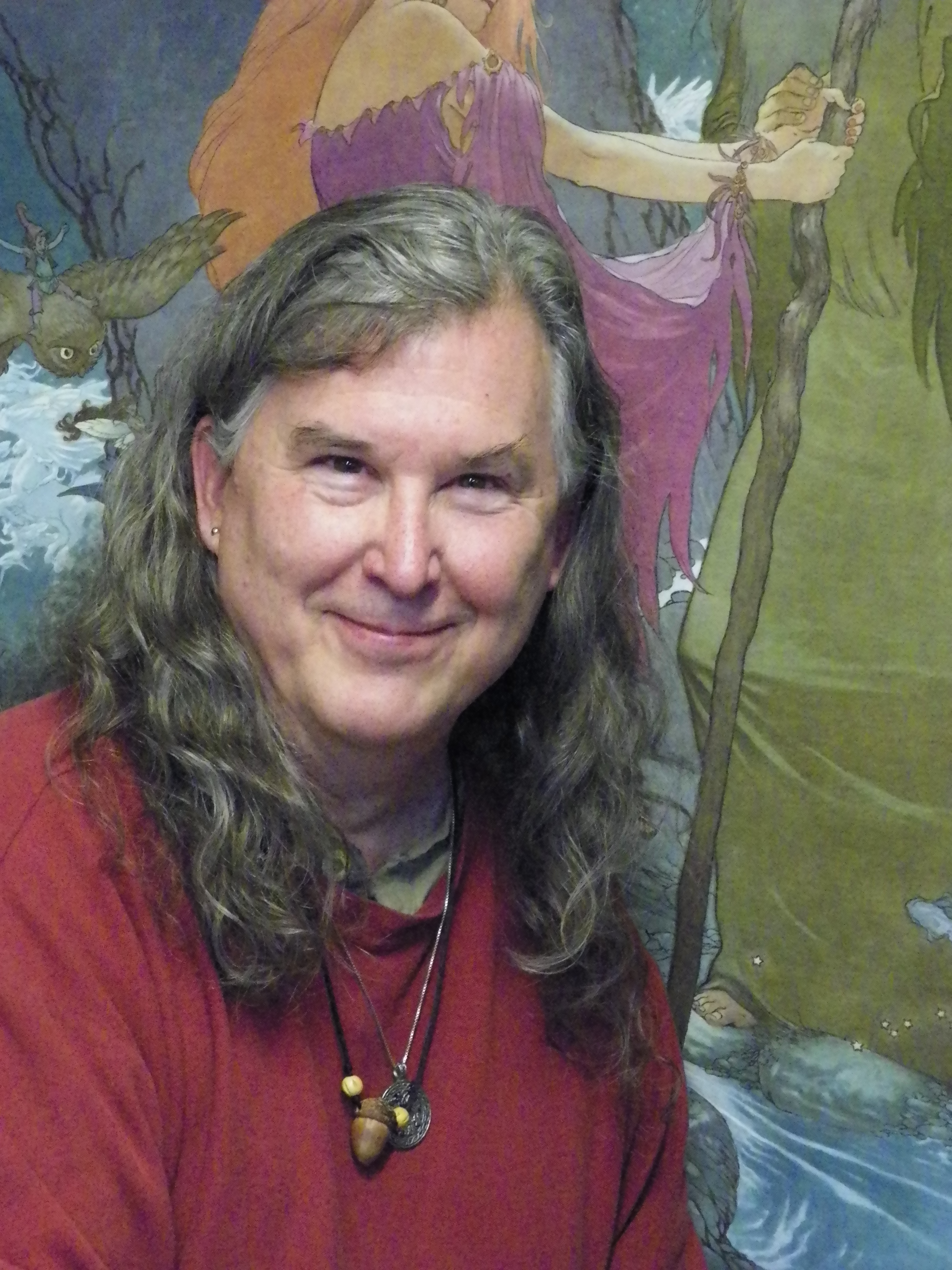
Charles Vess, fantasy and comic book artist

- Diana al-Hadid – sculptor and installation artist (MFA 2005)
- Hannah Altman – photographer (MFA 2020)
- Chino Amobi – contemporary artist, musician and painter
- Fahmida Azim – Pulitzer Prize-winning illustrator
- Sam Bass – motorsports artist
- Trudy Benson – abstract artist (BFA 2007)
- Nell Blaine – landscape painter
- Noah Bradley – fantasy artist known for Dungeons & Dragons
- Loryn Brazier – painter, known for her portraits of Virginia politicians
- James Bumgardner – painter, multimedia artist, RPI, VCU art faculty (BFA 1955)
- Lauren Clay – sculptor known for her large fantasy inspired installations
- Daryl Cobb – children's book illustrator
- Tony Cokes – visual artist and educator (MFA 1985)
- Bonnie Collura – artist known for figurative multi-media sculptures, textiles and installations
- Rose Datoc Dall – painter (BFA 1990)
- Assil Diab – Sudanese graphic designer
- Paul DiPasquale – sculptor known for designing several public sculptures in Virginia, including the Arthur Ashe Monument on Richmond's Monument Avenue and King Neptune on Virginia Beach's boardwalk
- Tara Donovan – sculptor (MFA 1999)
- Rama Duwaji – animator, illustrator and ceramist, First Lady of New York City (BFA 2019)
- Torkwase Dyson – painter (BFA 1999)
- Joseph Craig English – printmaker (BFA 1970)
- Moses Jacob Ezekiel – sculptor (1866–68)
- Tarfia Faizullah – poet
- Colette Fu – photographer, book artist and paper engineer, known for her pop-up books
- Judith Godwin – abstract painter
- Emmet Gowin – photographer and portraitist
- Donwan Harrell – fashion designer, founder of Prps and Akademiks (BFA 1989)
- Sylvia Harris – graphic designer known for designing the U.S. Census and as a pioneer in social impact design
- Sally Heller – artist known for her large installations
- Lisa Hoke – sculptor and installation artist (BFA 1978)
- Brian Hubble – illustrator
- Katie Hudnall – artist known for woodworking
- Sterling Hundley – illustrator and painter (BFA 1998)
- Anna Journey – poet
- Michael Kaluta – comic book artist
- Abby Kasonik – painter (BFA 1998)
- Dawn Kasper – interdisciplinary artist
- Matt Kenyon – new media artist
- Ana Ines Barragan King – founder of the Latin Ballet of Virginia
- Mia LaBerge – oil painter
- Abigail Larson – fantasy artist
- Nate Lewis – cut paper sculptor (BS 2009)
- Whitney Lynn – sculptor and performance artist (BFA 2004)
- Philip B. Meggs – graphic designer and historian of design (BFA 1964, MFA 1971)
- Wiley Miller – cartoonist
- Eric Millikin – conceptual, internet, video and performance artist (MFA 2021)
- Ayanah Moor – conceptual artist
- Lois Morrison – book artist
- Charlotte Moss – interior designer, author and philanthropist
- Mel Odom – book cover artist
- G. Byron Peck – mural artist
- Jon Pineda – poet
- Kevin Powers – poet
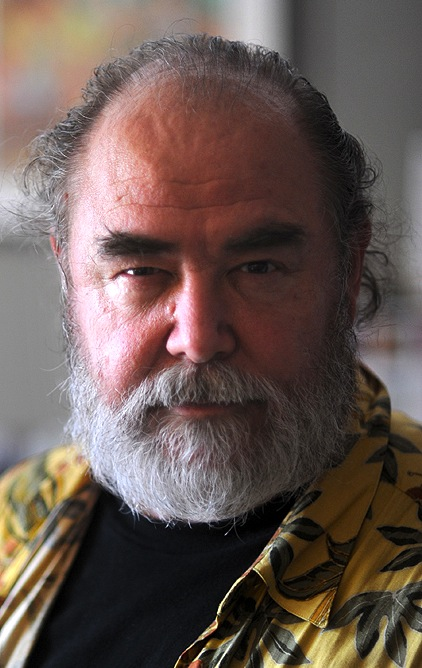
- Michael Kaluta, writer and artist
  Alston Purvis – graphic designer and author
- Beatrice Riese – artist and art collector
- Rob G. – comic book artist
- Anne Savedge – photographic artist
- Steve Segal – Pixar animator
- Mark Sloan – museum curator
- Janice Smith – furniture maker (BFA 1976)
- Ron Smith – poet
- Carol Sutton – painter and sculptor (BFA 1967)
- Alice Tangerini – botanical illustrator
- Kevin Tinsley – comic book illustrator
- Allison Titus – poet
- Alessandra Torres – performance and installation artist (MFA 2006)
- Phil Trumbo – art director and graphic designer
- Betony Vernon – jewelry designer
- Charles Vess – fantasy and comics illustrator (BFA 1974)

== Business ==
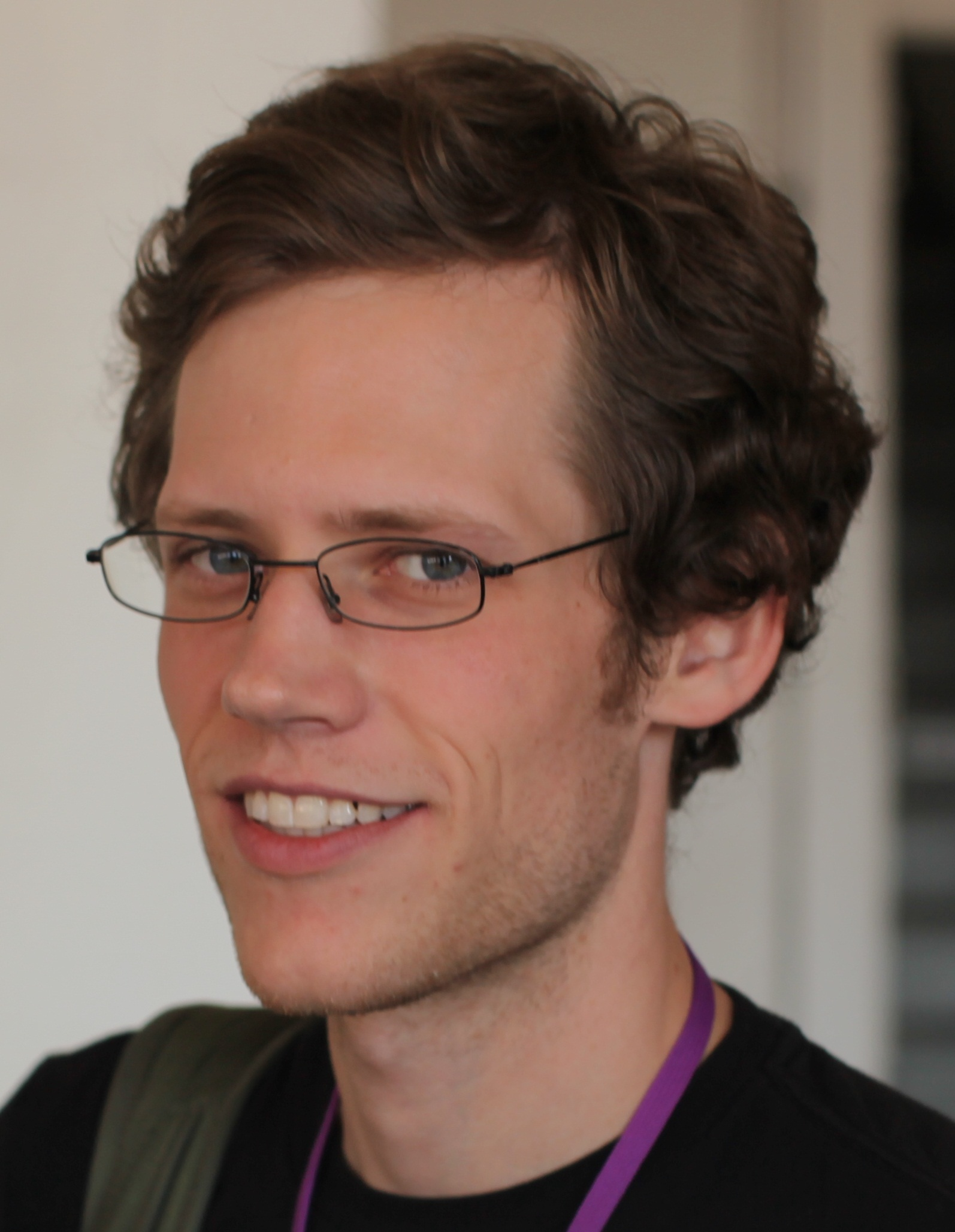
4chan founder Christopher Poole

- Richard M. Bracken – chairman and chief executive officer (CEO) of the Hospital Corporation of America
- Jeff Ray Clark – economist specializing in public choice theory
- Edward N. Coffman – accounting scholar who specialized in its history
- Jerry Dipoto – Seattle Mariners baseball executive
- Catherine C. Eckel – behavioral economist
- Robert Graboyes – economist and musician
- John Graham – economist and professor at Duke University's Fuqua School of Business
- Donwan Harrell – creator of luxury denim line PRPS and designer at Nike
- Jenny Hollowell – music industry executive
- Mildred Callahan Jones – known as the "Flag Lady," she pioneered the decorative flag industry
- Carole Ann Klonarides – art consultant
- Angela Patton – CEO of Girls for a Change
- Christopher Poole – founder of 4chan
- Norman Sisisky – founder of Petersburg Bottling Company, which became Pepsi (BBA)
- Kenneth Sullivan – CEO of Smithfield Foods

== Government ==
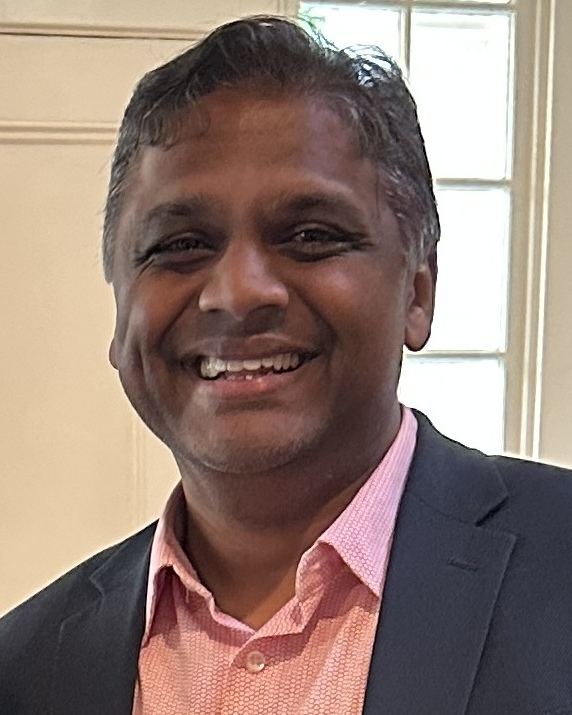
Danny Avula, mayor of Richmond, Virginia and leader of Virginia's vaccine efforts during COVID-19

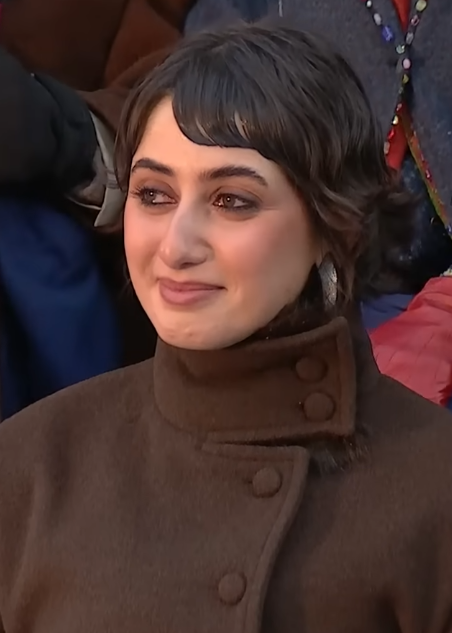
Rama Duwaji, First Lady of New York City

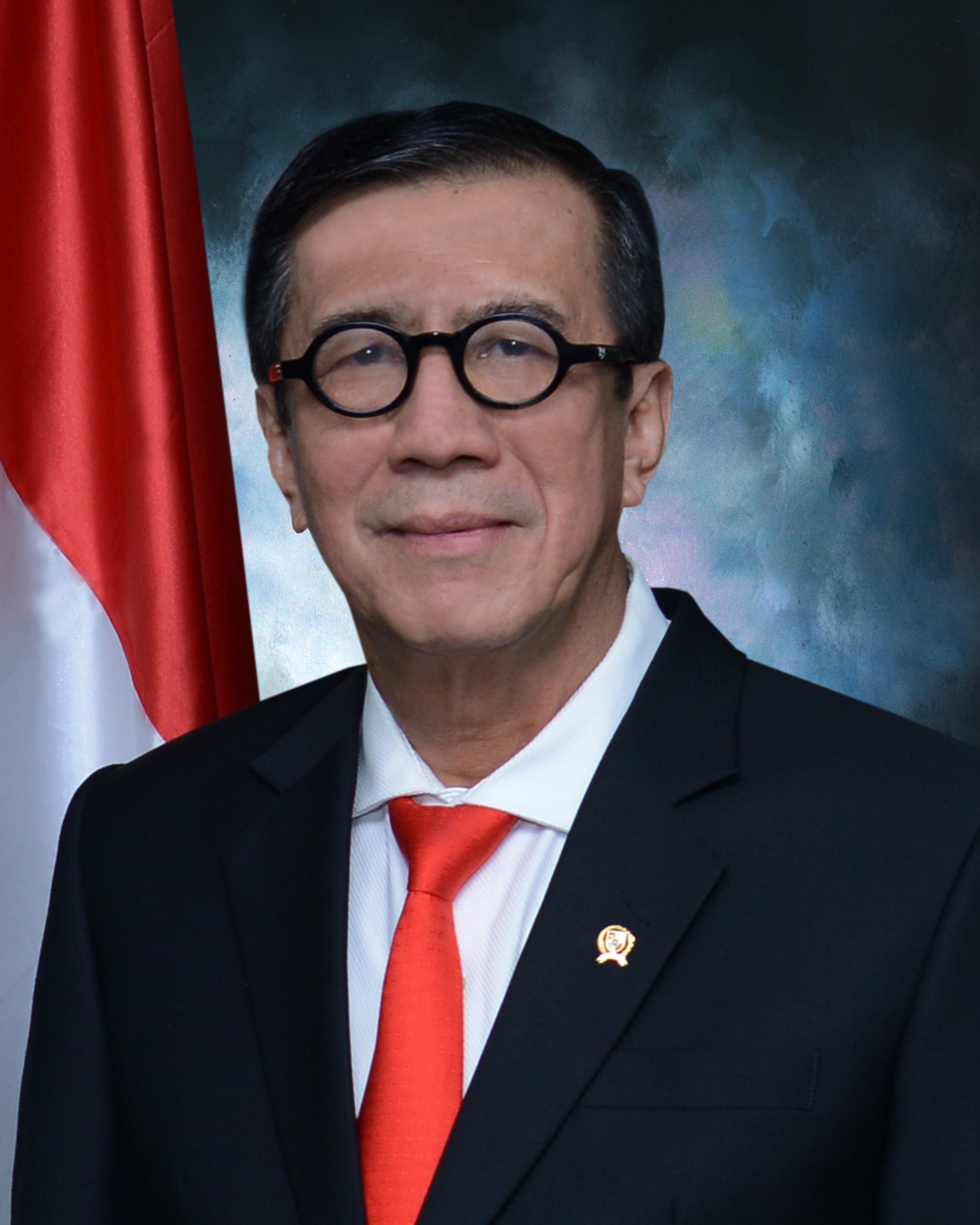
Yasonna Laoly, Minister of Law and Human Rights for Indonesia

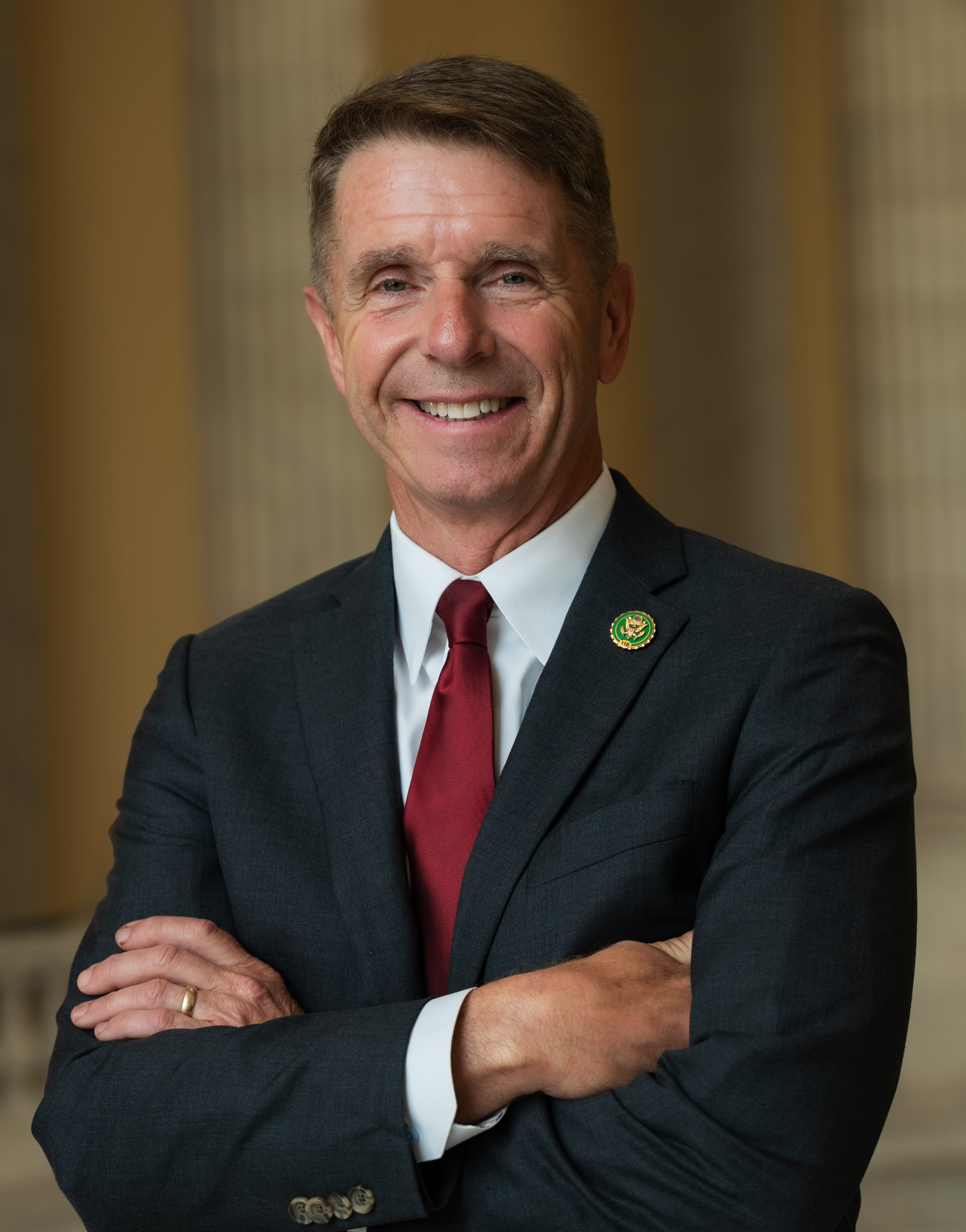
U.S. Representative Rob Wittman

- Watkins Abbitt, Jr. – member of the Virginia House of Delegates
- Lashrecse Aird – member of the Virginia State Senate
- Clay Athey – politician and jurist
- Danny Avula – mayor of Richmond, Virginia
- Lamont Bagby – member of the Virginia State Senate
- Carl E. Bain – pharmacist and politician who served in the Virginia House of Delegates
- Cynthia Ball – state politician from North Carolina
- Peter A. Blake – Virginia secretary of Education
- John Fulmer Bright – mayor of Richmond, Virginia
- Walter C. Caudill – member of the Virginia General Assembly
- Michael Chapman – director of Homeland Security for Missouri
- Keyanna Conner – Virginia secretary of Administration
- Virgil J. Cox – member of the Virginia House of Delegates
- Rosalyn Dance – former member of the Virginia State Senate
- Bob Deuell – member of the Texas Senate
- Rama Duwaji – First Lady of New York
- Natalie Edwards – former senior official at the United States Department of the Treasury
- Cerina Fairfax – Second Lady of Virginia
- Debra Gardner – member of the Virginia House of Delegates
- Conley E. Greear – politician and dentist
- Alan Gross – U.S. government contractor arrested in Cuba
- Todd Haymore – Virginia Secretary of Commerce (MBA)
- Megan Healy – Virginia secretary of Labor
- Cynthia Eppes Hudson – deputy attorney general for Virginia
- Anita Josey-Herring – chief judge of the Superior Court of Washington D.C.
- Chris LaCivita – senior advisor to Donald Trump's 2024 campaign
- Yasonna Laoly – Minister of Law and Human Rights of Indonesia (2014–present)
- John W. Marshall – secretary of Public Safety for Virginia
- Adele McClure – member of the Virginia House of Delegates
- Nancy McFarlane – former mayor of Raleigh, North Carolina (2011–2019)
- Delores McQuinn – member of the Virginia House of Delegates
- Jackson Miller – director of the Department of Criminal Justice Services of Virginia
- Kim E. Petersen – security and counter-terrorism expert
- Todd Pillion – member of the Virginia State Senate
- Will Sessoms – mayor of Virginia Beach, Virginia (2008–2018)
- Javaid Siddiqi – Virginia secretary of Education
- Marilyn Tavenner – administrator of the Centers for Medicare and Medicaid Services, an agency of the United States Department of Health and Human Services
- Kim Taylor – member of Virginia House of Delegates
- Ronald L. Tillett – Virginia secretary of Finance
- Dietra Trent – Virginia secretary of Education
- Schuyler VanValkenburg – member of Virginia House of Delegates
- Nikuyah Walker – mayor of Charlottesville, Virginia
- Justin Wilson – mayor of Alexandria, Virginia
- Rob Wittman – Republican member of the United States House of Representatives, representing Virginia's 1st congressional district

== Media ==
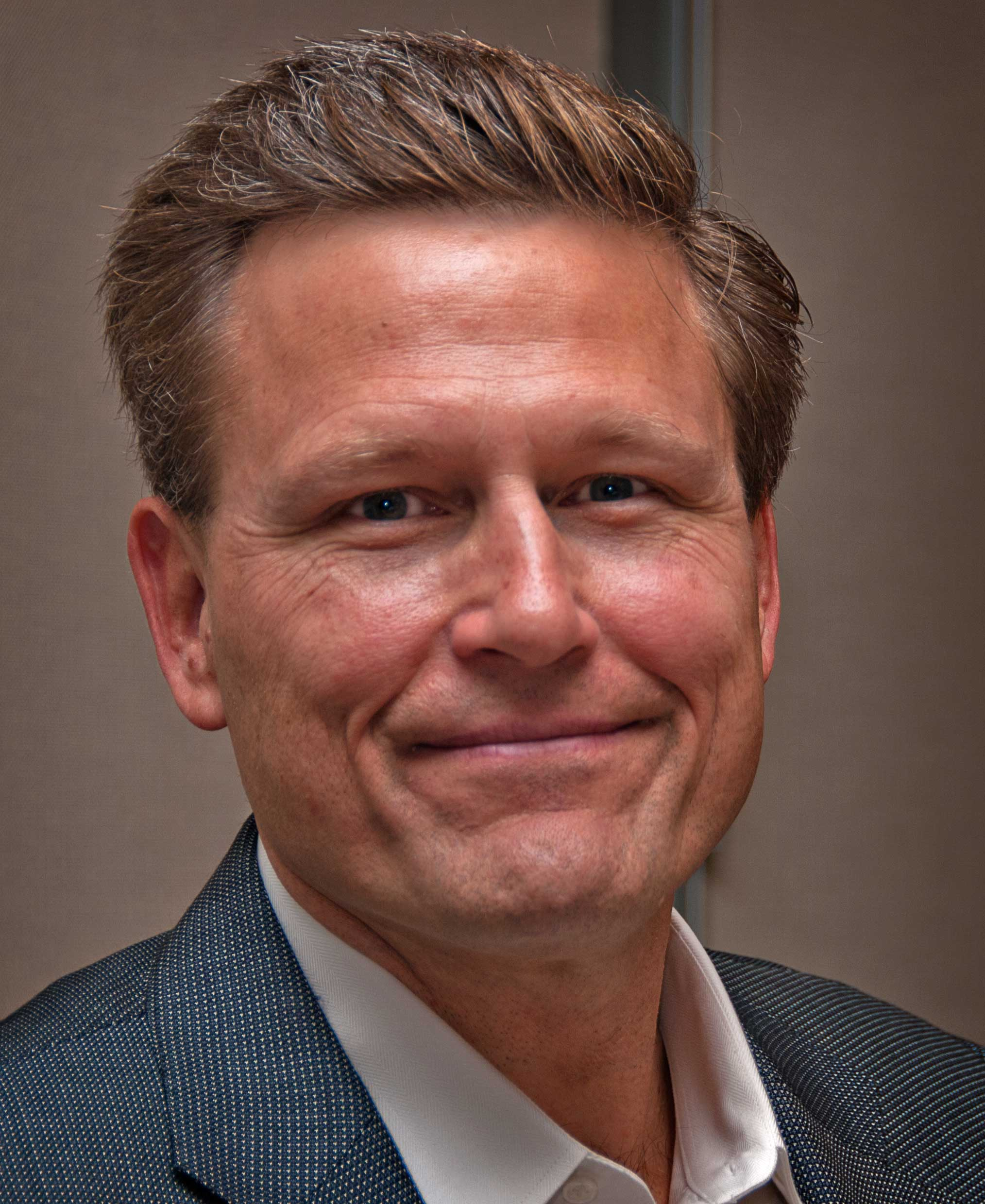
Author David Baldacci

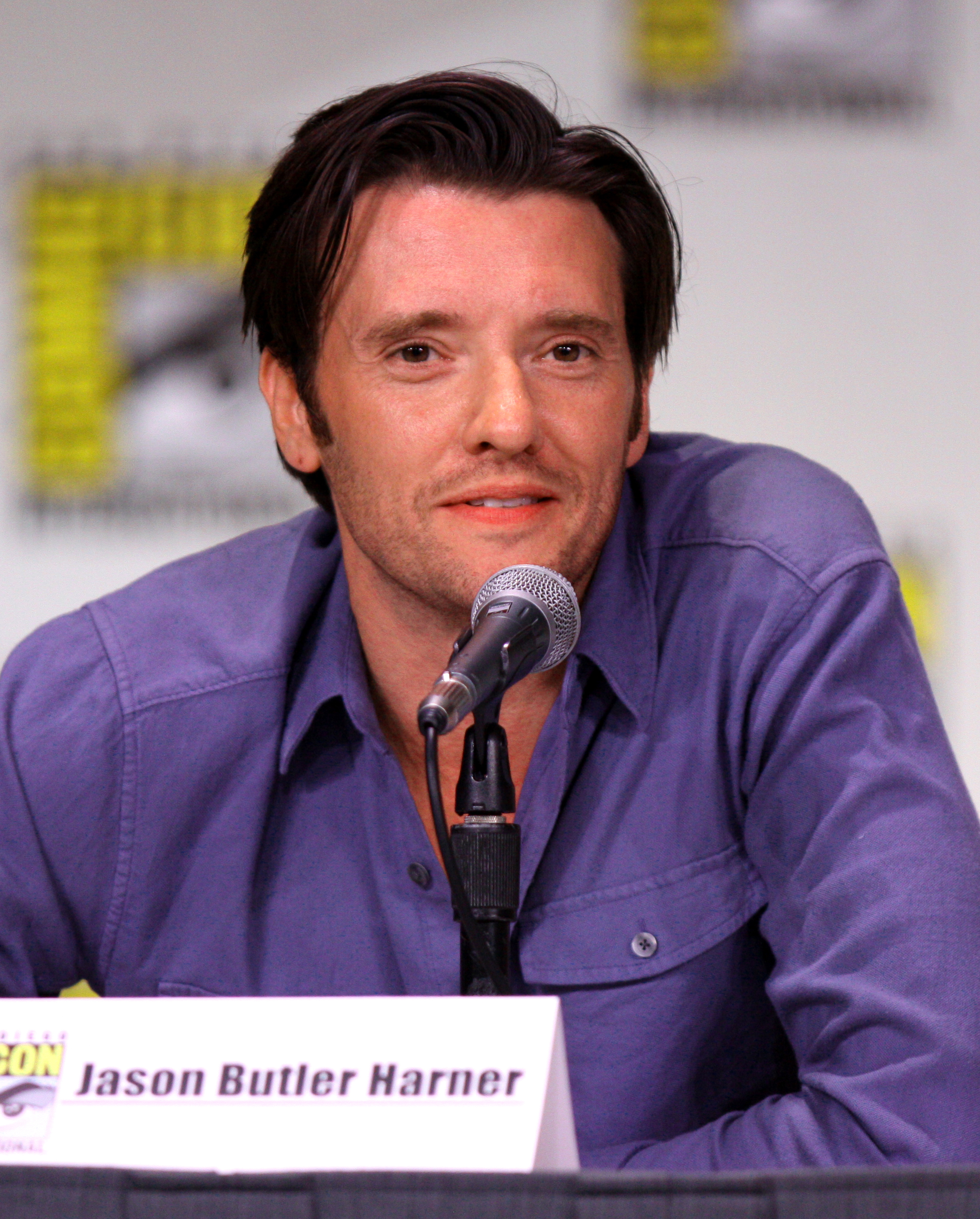
Actor Jason Butler Harner

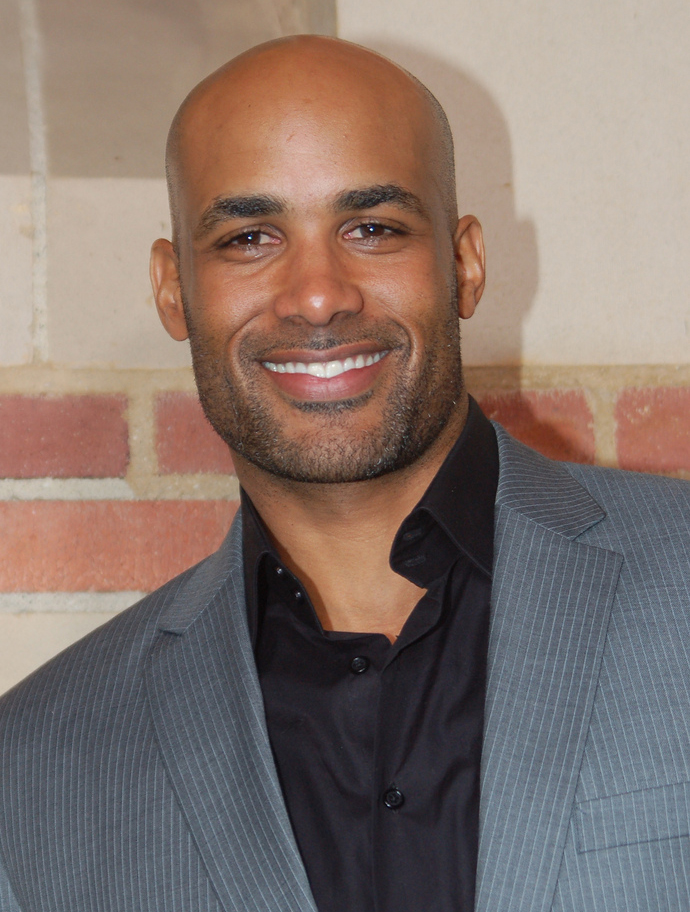
Actor Boris Kodjoe

- Mamé Adjei – runner-up of America's Next Top Model cycle 22
- David Baldacci – author, best known for his novel Absolute Power (1996)
- Greg Barrett – journalist and public speaker
- Macon Blair – actor and Sundance Grand Jury Prize-winning filmmaker, known for his collaborations with Jeremy Saulnier
- Cocoa Brown – actress
- Reilly Brown – comic book illustrator and writer, known for his work on Cable & Deadpool
- Caressa Cameron – 2010 Miss America
- Paris Campbell Grace – TikToker, singer, and comedian
- Daryl Cobb – author, national children's educational presenter
- Chad L. Coleman – actor
- Andrea Detwiler – 2006 Daytime Emmy winner
- Stephen Furst – actor and director, known as "Flounder" in the National Lampoon classic Animal House (1978) as well as TV series St. Elsewhere and Babylon 5
- Jason Butler Harner – Broadway, television, and film actor; performed in original production of Coast of Utopia; was in Clint Eastwood's Oscar-nominated film Changeling
- Jennifer A. Johnson – chief editor of the journal Sexualization, Media, and Society
- Bilal Khan – Pakistani singer and actor
- Zachary Knighton – actor, ABC series Happy Endings
- Boris Kodjoe – actor, model
- Robert Lanham – author, best known for his book The Hipster Handbook (2003)
- Valerie LaPointe – director and storyboard artist for Pixar Animation Studios
- Debbie Matenopoulos – TV host, known for co-hosting ABC's The View, The Daily 10, and TV Guide Channel's The Screening Room
- Rebekah McKendry – film director
- Wiley Miller – cartoonist and author of the comic strip Non Sequitur
- Caelynn Miller-Keyes – runner-up Miss USA 2018, Bachelor and Bachelor in Paradise contestant
- Trevor Moore – comedian and founding member of The Whitest Kids U' Know
- Howard Owen – journalist, author of crime fiction and the novel Littlejohn
- Jay Pharoah – comedian and Saturday Night Live cast member
- Jon Pineda – award-winning poet and novelist
- Christopher Poole, aka moot – founder of 4chan
- Amita Rao - actress, comedian, known for Deli Boys (2025) and Adults (2025–)
- Kevin Powers – novelist and poet, known for The Yellow Birds (2013), a finalist for the National Book Award
- Tom Robbins – author, best known for his novel Even Cowgirls Get the Blues (1976)
- Steve Segal – comic artist, animation director
- Ronnie Sidney, II – graphic novelist
- Robb Spewak – producer and radio personality for The Don and Mike Show and The Mike O'Meara Show
- Steve Rasnic Tem – horror fiction writer, winner of the World Fantasy, British Fantasy and Bram Stoker Awards
- Phil Trumbo – film animator, artist
- Brandon Wardell – comedian and Twitter personality
- Mike Wieringo – comic book artist for Marvel and DC comics; co-creator of Image Comics series Tellos

== Music ==
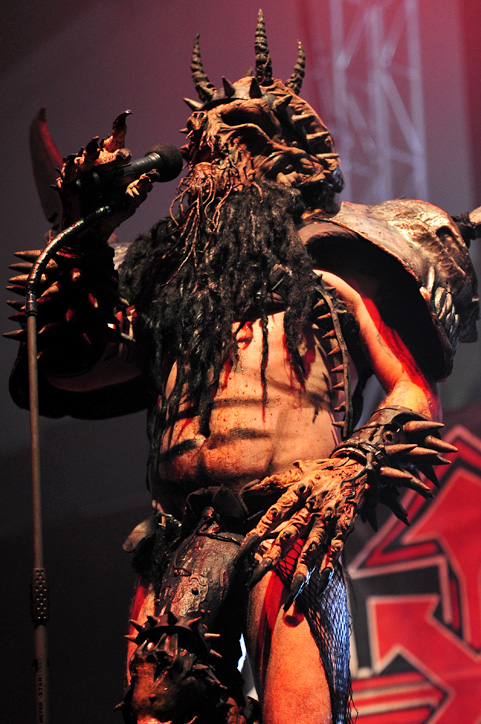
Several founding members of Gwar attended VCU; pictured is Dave Brockie.

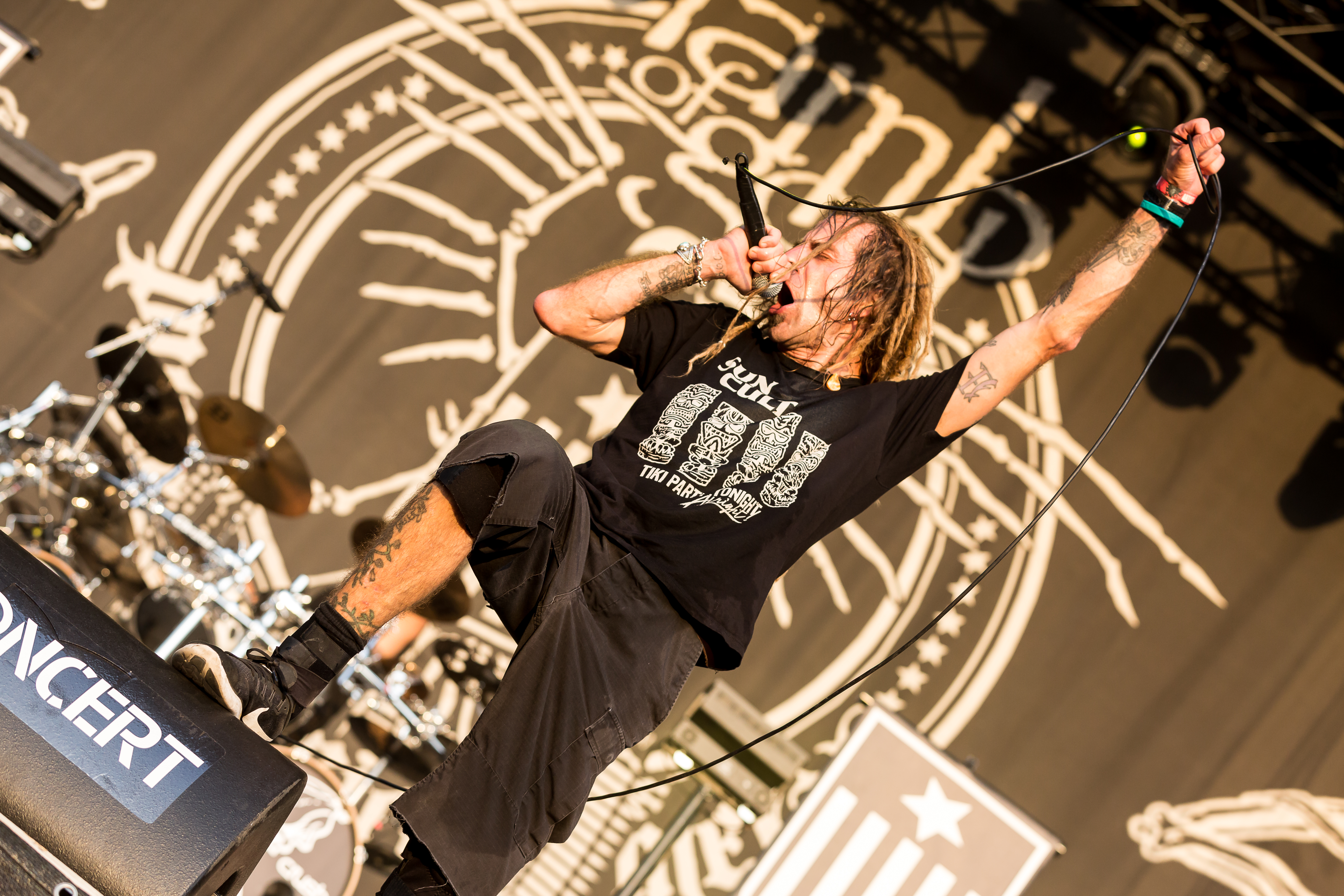
Lamb of God

- Chris Adler – drummer for Lamb of God
- Chino Amobi – experimental electronic musician
- Anthony Anderson – operatic baritone singer
- Anhayla – singer-songwriter, guitarist
- Sam Beam – singer/songwriter known as Iron & Wine
- Bruce Bouton – country music guitarist
- Lucy Dacus – singer-songwriter
- McKinley Dixon – rapper and singer
- Nickelus F – rapper, producer, videographer
- Gwar – several founding members of the band, including Dave Brockie
- Gordy Haab – composer of the Star Wars video games music and multiple award winner in that genre
- Loston Harris – jazz pianist
- Darius Jones – saxophonist
- Emre Kartari – Turkish jazz percussionist
- Lamb of God – several founding members of the band
- Stefan Lessard – bassist for Dave Matthews Band
- Matthew Ramsey – songwriter, lead singer for Old Dominion
- Nate Smith – drummer, songwriter, producer, and three-time Grammy nominee
- Eric Stanley – violinist, composer
- Robbin Thompson – singer-songwriter
- Steve West – drummer of the indie rock band Pavement and front man for Marble Valley

== Science ==
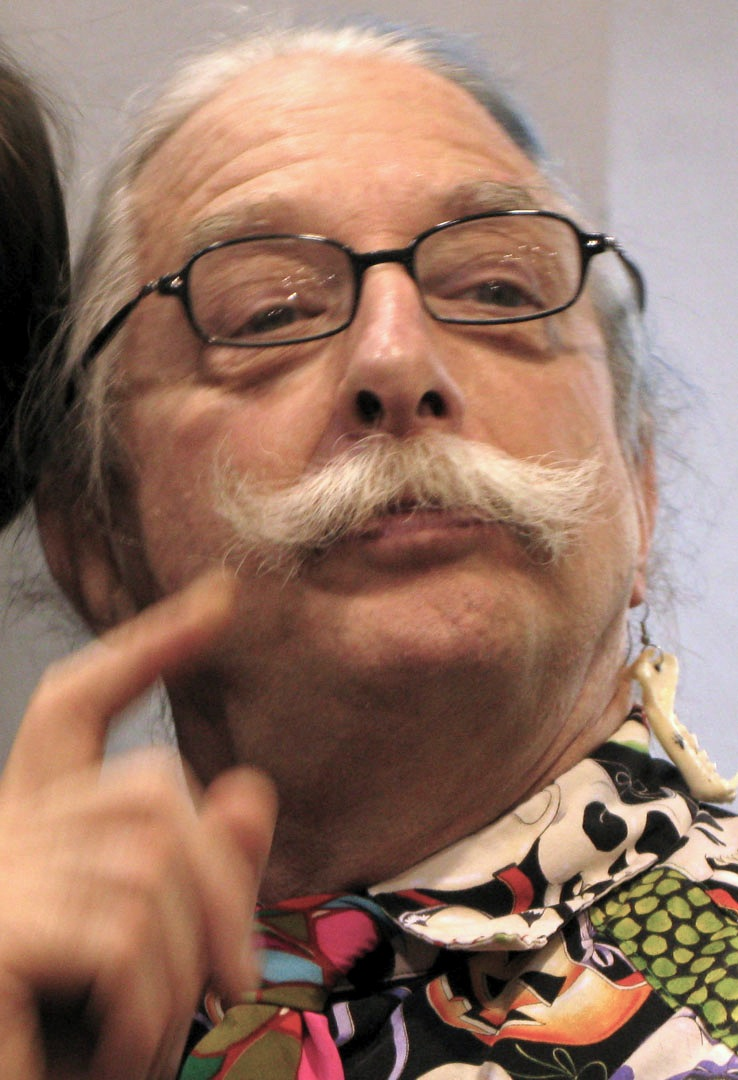
Physician, actor, activist, author and clown Patch Adams

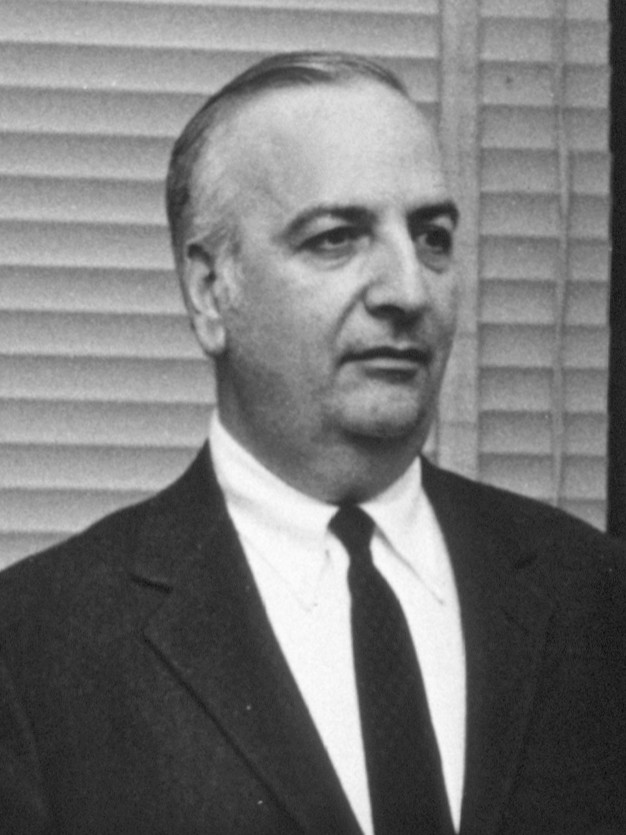
Nobel Prize winner Baruj Benacerraf

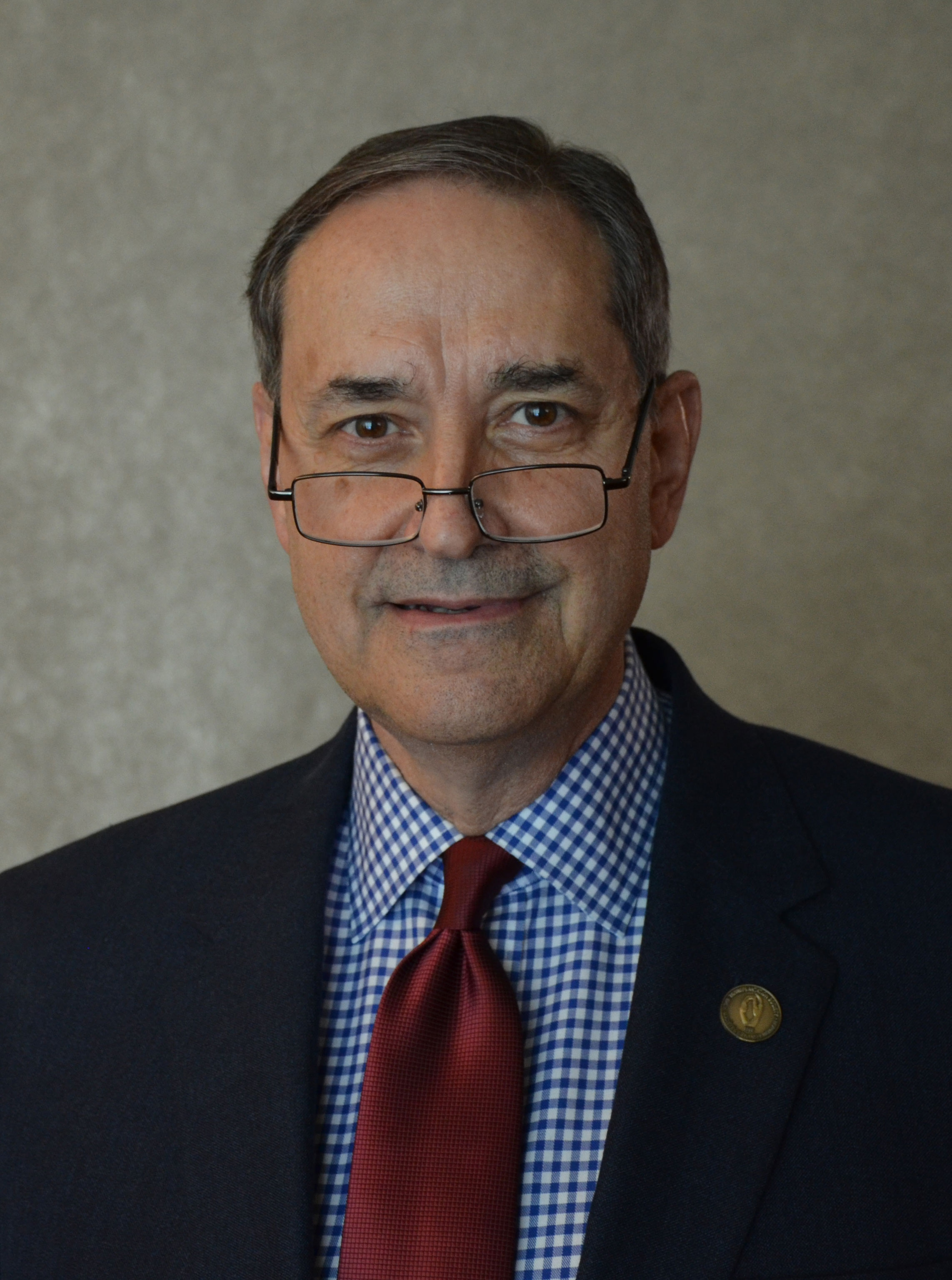
Francis L. Delmonico, health expert in the field of transplantation and professor of surgery at Harvard Medical School

- Hunter "Patch" Adams – founder of the Gesundheit! Institute and subject of the movie Patch Adams
- Arpana Agrawal – psychiatric geneticist and professor of psychiatry, 2018 Theodore Reich Young Investigator Award
- Beatriz Amendola – Uruguayan-American radiation oncologist
- Meike Bartels – behavioral geneticist, known for research on the genetics of happiness
- Mary Baughman – physician, medical school professor, and clubwoman
- Baruj Benacerraf – winner of the 1980 Nobel Prize in Medicine, class of 1945
- Frederick Bieber – Canadian-American geneticist currently serving as senior medical geneticist at Brigham and Women's Hospital, member of the Faculty of Medicine at Harvard University
- William Chivous Bostic Sr., class of 1905
- Kathleen T. Brady – psychiatrist
- Lorna Breen – physician
- Caroline Orr Bueno (PhD) – social and behavioral sciences researcher specializing in disinformation networks
- Georgia Chenevix-Trench – cancer researcher who investigates genetic predispositions to cancer
- Anne L. Coleman – chair of the Department of Ophthalmology and Director of the Stein Eye Institute at University of California, Los Angeles
- Joseph DeJarnette – director of Western State Hospital, physician and eugenicist
- Francis L. Delmonico – surgeon, clinical professor and health expert in the field of transplantation
- Brian D'Onofrio – psychologist who researches the causes of psychopathology in children and adolescents
- Dorothy Espelage – psychologist and expert in teen violence
- Mary Cynthia Farach-Carson – biochemist, known for her work in extracellular matrix, perlecan, tissue engineering and bone metastasis
- Ann S. Fulcher – abdominal radiologist and chair of the department of radiology at Virginia Commonwealth University/Medical College of Medicine
- Isabel Garcia – dentist and academic administrator
- Nassir Ghaemi – psychiatrist, author, and professor of Psychiatry at Tufts University School of Medicine
- Philip C. Kendall – psychologist who produced the Coping Cat program
- Saul Krugman – medical researcher who discovered a vaccine against hepatitis B
- Feng Liu – material physicist
- Michael L. Madigan – biomedical engineer
- Benjamin Neale – statistical geneticist with a specialty in psychiatric genetics
- Eduardo D. Rodriguez – Cuban-American plastic and reconstructive surgeon, and reconstructive transplant surgeon, who is known for his contribution to the field of facial transplantation and vascularized composite allotransplantation
- Gladys Smithwick – physician and Presbyterian medical missionary in China and the Belgian Congo
- Sudhir Srivastava – chief of the Cancer Biomarkers Research Group of the Division of Cancer Prevention at the United States NCI
- Jeffery Taubenberger, M.D. – virologist
- Arpad Vass – research scientist, forensic anthropologist and professor

== Sports ==
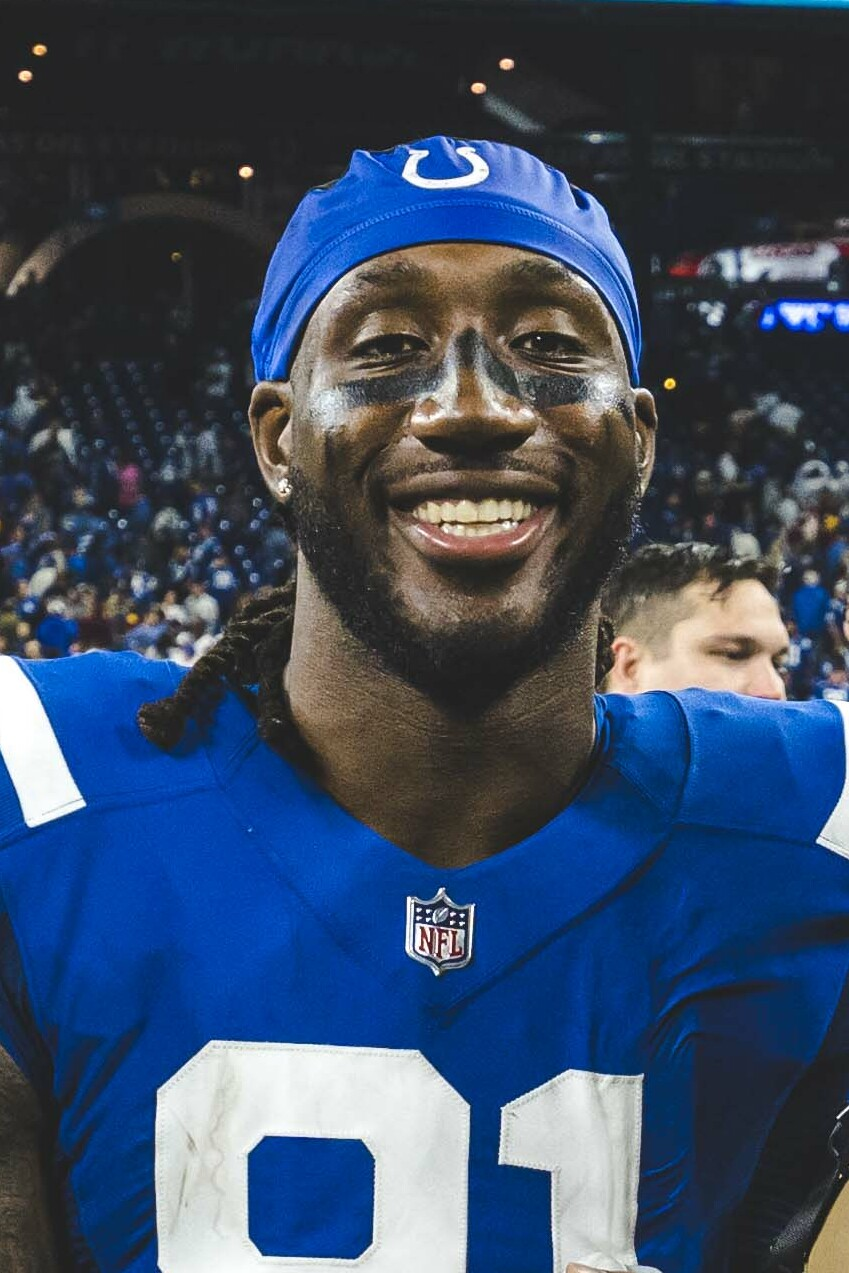
Basketball and football player Mo Alie-Cox

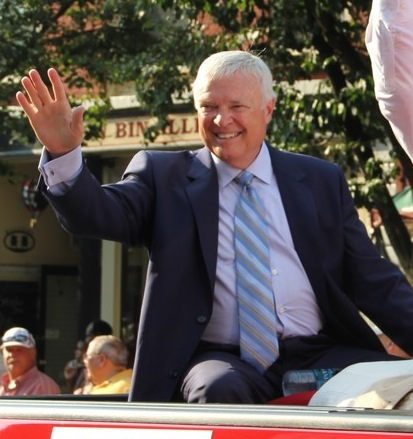
Dave Van Horne, broadcaster honored at the Baseball Hall of Fame

- Mo Alie-Cox – current tight end for the Indianapolis Colts
- Yann Bonato – former European professional basketball player; former France National Team member; member of France's silver medal-winning men's basketball team at the 2000 Sydney Olympics; played one season (1990–91) at VCU
- Troy Daniels – current shooting guard for Olimpia Milano
- Andrew Dykstra – MLS goalkeeper for D.C. United; also played with the Chicago Fire in MLS
- Treveon Graham – current forward in the G League
- Lanto Griffin – current professional golfer on the PGA Tour
- Sherman Hamilton – former member of Canadian National Men's Basketball Team; participated in 2000 Olympics in Sydney, Australia
- Gerald Henderson – played for the Boston Celtics, Detroit Pistons, Seattle SuperSonics, and San Antonio Spurs, winning four NBA championships
- Quanitra Hollingsworth – center for the Washington Mystics of the WNBA; member of Turkey's 2012 Olympic women's basketball team
- Bones Hyland – guard for the Minnesota Timberwolves
- Brandon Inge – MLB infielder, formerly with the Pittsburgh Pirates, Oakland Athletics and Detroit Tigers
- Sean Marshall – relief pitcher for the Cincinnati Reds
- Eric Maynor – played for the Washington Wizards and Philadelphia 76ers
- Cla Meredith – former MLB relief pitcher; played for the Boston Red Sox, San Diego Padres and Baltimore Orioles
- Hayley Moorwood – member of New Zealand women's Olympic Soccer Team in Beijing in 2008 and London in 2012
- Dominic Oduro – current forward for the Columbus Crew in MLS
- Juvonte Reddic (born 1992) – basketball player in the Israeli Basketball Premier League
- John Rollins – professional golfer and PGA pro
- Larry Sanders – drafted #15 overall by the Milwaukee Bucks in the 2010 NBA Draft
- Gonzalo Segares – former defender for Apollon Limassol in Cyprus; former defender for the Chicago Fire in MLS
- Scott Sizemore – infielder for the Oakland Athletics
- Justin Tillman (born 1996) – basketball player for Hapoel Tel Aviv in the Israeli Basketball Premier League
- Dave Van Horne – broadcaster honored at the Baseball Hall of Fame
- Brianté Weber (born 1992) – basketball player in the Israeli Basketball Premier League

== Other ==
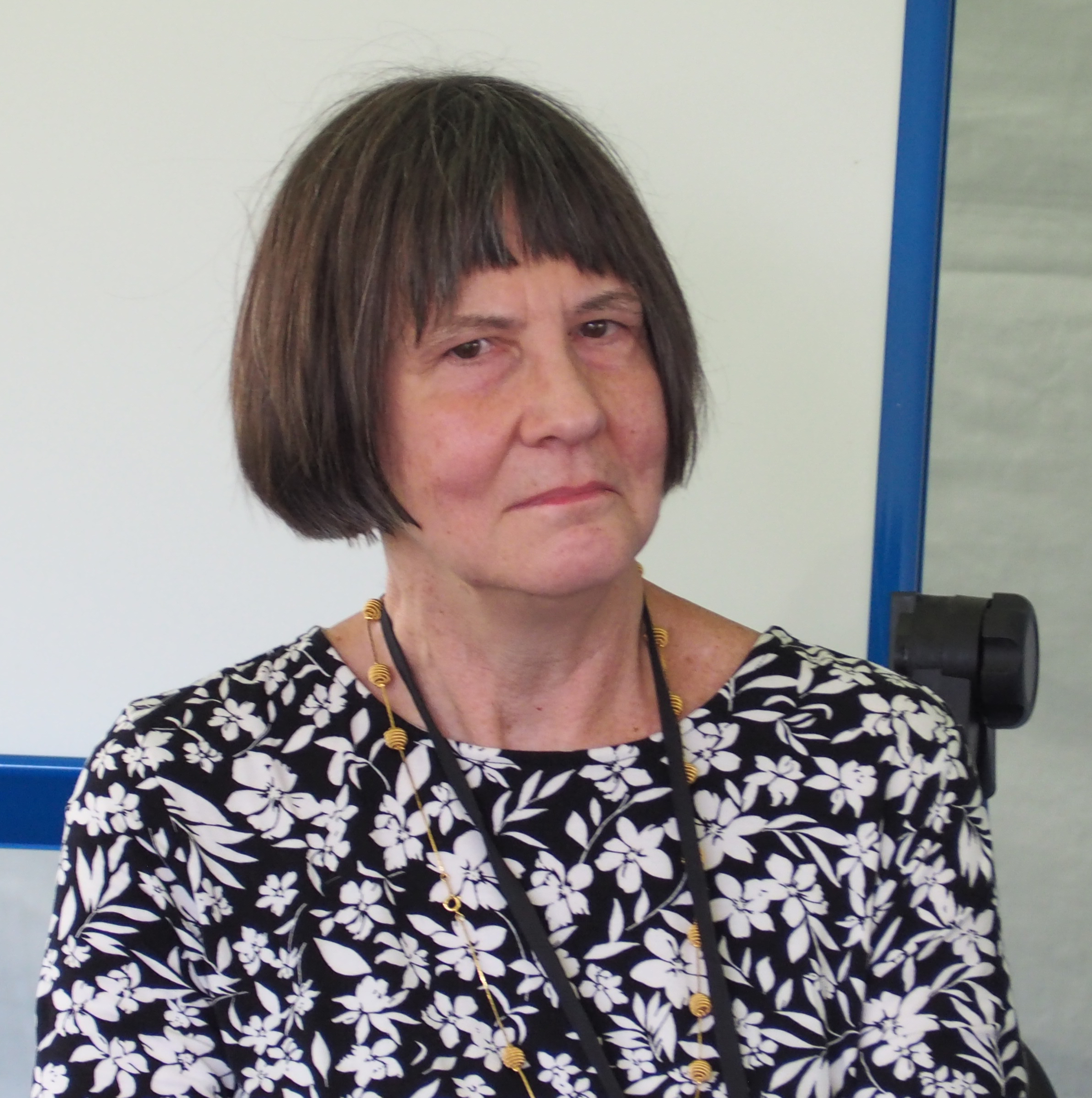
Susan Higginbotham, historical fiction novelist and attorney

- Leona S. Aiken – psychology professor
- William M. Anderson Jr. (BA) – president of the University of Mary Washington
- Nancy Wright Beasley – author
- Errett Callahan – archeologist
- Caressa Cameron – Miss Virginia
- Eric H. du Plessis – author, translator and educator
- Frank E. Grizzard Jr. – American historian
- Grace E. Harris – academic administrator and social worker
- Susan Higginbotham – historical fiction author and attorney
- Jack Hranicky – archeologist
- Hendrée E. Jones – researcher on women's substance abuse
- Eileen A. Joy – Old English literary specialist
- Mirta Martin (Ph.D. 1996) – ninth president of Fort Hays State University
- Sesha Joi Moon – chief diversity officer of the Commonwealth of Virginia; former chief diversity officer of the U.S. House of Representatives (B.A. 2005, M.S. 2008)
- Margaret Ann Neale – Adams Distinguished Professor of Management, emerita, at the Stanford Graduate School of Business
- Howard Owen – author and winner of the Hammett Prize
- Sheri Reynolds – author of contemporary Southern fiction
