= Anthony Anderson (disambiguation) =

Anthony Anderson (born 1970) is an American comedian and actor.

Anthony or Tony Anderson/sen may also refer to:

- Anthony Anderson (running back) (born 1956), American football running back
- Anthony Anderson (defensive back) (born 1964), American football defensive back
- Anthony Anderson (baritone) (born c. 1998), American opera singer
- Anthony Anderson (basketball) (born 1981), American basketball player
- Anthony Anderson (murderer), British murderer committing his crimes in mid-1980s
- Anthony Anderson (politician) (1767–1847), Scottish-born merchant and political figure in Lower Canada
- Anthony Anderson (producer), Australian film producer
- Anthony Anderson (theologian) (died 1593), English theological writer and preacher
- C. Anthony Anderson (born 1940), American philosopher
- Tony Anderson (Australian rules footballer) (1942–2020)
- Tony Anderson (rugby league) (born 1961), Australian rugby league footballer and coach
- Ian Button (born 1962), English guitarist who produced some work under the pseudonym Anthony Anderson
- Anthony Andersen, Inuk politician
- Antony Bertram Anderson (born 1963), Jamaican military officer and diplomat

== See also ==
- Antonio Anderson (born 1985), American basketball player
- Antonio Anderson (American football) (born 1973), American football defensive lineman
