= Hendrée E. Jones =

- Occupations: Professor of Obstetrics; Executive Director of the UNC Horizons Program
- Spouse: Erik Lensch
- Awards: 2019 Marian W. Fischman Lectureship Award; 2012 Betty Ford Award; 2005 APA Early Distinguished Scientific Awards for Early Career Contributions to Psychology

Academic background
- Education: Virginia Commonwealth University

Hendrée E. Jones is a researcher on women's substance abuse disorders and its impact on children. She is a professor in the Department of Obstetrics and Gynecology at the University of North Carolina School of Medicine, and adjunct professor in the University of North Carolina College of Arts & Sciences Department of Psychology and Neuroscience. Jones is the executive director of the UNC Horizons Program, which is a comprehensive drug treatment program for mothers and their drug-exposed children. She is a consultant for the Substance Abuse and Mental Health Services Administration, the United Nations, and the World Health Organization.

Jones was awarded the 2019 Marian W. Fischman Lectureship Award, in honor of the late Marian W. Fischman, a pioneer in drug abuse research. She received the 2015 Award of Excellence in International Collaborative Research (with Gabriele Fischer) from the NIDA International Program for their multi-site clinical trial of "Maternal Opioid Treatment: Human Experimental Research" (MOTHER project) which suggests that buprenorphine is a safe and effective treatment for opioid dependence during pregnancy when compared to methadone. In 2012, she received Betty Ford Award from Association for Medical Education and Research in Substance Abuse, because of her contribution to the advancement of women's addiction treatment. She was also awarded the 2005 Early Distinguished Scientific Awards for Early Career Contributions to Psychology by the American Psychological Association. Jones' research has been funded by the United States National Institutes of Health.

== Biography ==
Jones was born in Richmond, Virginia. She received a Bachelors of Science in psychology from Virginia Commonwealth University and a Doctorate in Psychology from Johns Hopkins School of Medicine. She is married to Erik Lensch, with whom she has two children. They moved to North Carolina in 2006. In 2010, Jones served as the President of the American Psychological Association Division of Psychopharmacology and Substance Abuse (Division 28).

In an interview, Jones explained that she became interested in being a researcher after volunteering in a special needs classroom that her mother taught. During the volunteer experience, she saw children who had disabilities because of violence and toxins, and wanted to understand how to help mothers have healthier pregnancies and help children reach their full potential.

Jones co-authored Treating Women with Substance Use Disorders During Pregnancy: A Comprehensive Approach to Caring for Mother and Child (2013) with Karol Kaltenbach and provided an overview of treatments for pregnant women with substance use disorders. Jones co-authored Reinforcement-Based Treatment for Substance Use Disorders: A Comprehensive Behavioral Approach (2012) with L. Michelle Tuten, Cindy Schaeffer, and Maxine L. Stitzer, which serves as a manual for implementing Reinforcement-Based Treatment to treat substance use disorders in community settings.

== Research ==
Jones' research focuses on the development and examination of behavioral and pharmacological treatments for pregnant women and children in risky life situations, including substance use disorders.

One of the projects on which she worked investigated drug-use of women in the Republic of Georgia, by examining their psycho-social characteristics, drug use patterns, drug treatment barriers, and HIV/hepatitis C virus risk behaviors. The findings suggest that women were not seeking treatment because they did not have sufficient knowledge about the negative effects of addiction, and feared that their confidentiality would be compromised. The study emphasized the need to provide culturally relevant information on addiction, and the benefits of women-specific drug treatments to engage more drug-using women to participate in treatment.

Another project which Jones worked on relates to the clinical management of expecting mothers who are opioid dependent during pregnancy and after delivering their child. The findings from the MOTHER project were used to guide clinicians in the treatment of pregnant women who are addicted to opioids.

== Representative Publications ==
- Jones, H. E., Kaltenbach, K., Heil, S. H., Stine, S. M., Coyle, M. G., Arria, A. M., ... & Fischer, G. (2010). Neonatal abstinence syndrome after methadone or buprenorphine exposure. New England Journal of Medicine, 363(24), 2320–2331.
- Johnson, R. E., Jones, H. E., & Fischer, G. (2003). Use of buprenorphine in pregnancy: patient management and effects on the neonate. Drug and Alcohol Dependence, 70(2), S87-S101.
- Jones, H. E., O'Grady, K. E., Malfi, D., & Tuten, M. (2008). Methadone maintenance vs. methadone taper during pregnancy: maternal and neonatal outcomes. The American Journal on Addictions, 17(5), 372–386.
