= Sudhir Srivastava =

- Occupation: Scientist

Sudhir Srivastava is chief of the Cancer Biomarkers Research Group of the Division of Cancer Prevention at the United States NCI. Srivastava has held this position since 2000. He is a co-author of the Bethesda Guidelines for the diagnosis of Hereditary non-polyposis colorectal cancer (HNPCC).

Srivastava is an elected member of the American Joint Committee on Cancer (AJCC), responsible for developing cancer staging criteria, and serves on the AJCC Executive Committee and the All Ireland-NCI Consortium. Srivastava is a founding member of HUPO, participated in the Plasma Proteome and the Liver Proteome Projects, and supported several HUPO-supported initiatives.
