= Francis L. Delmonico =

American transplant surgeon

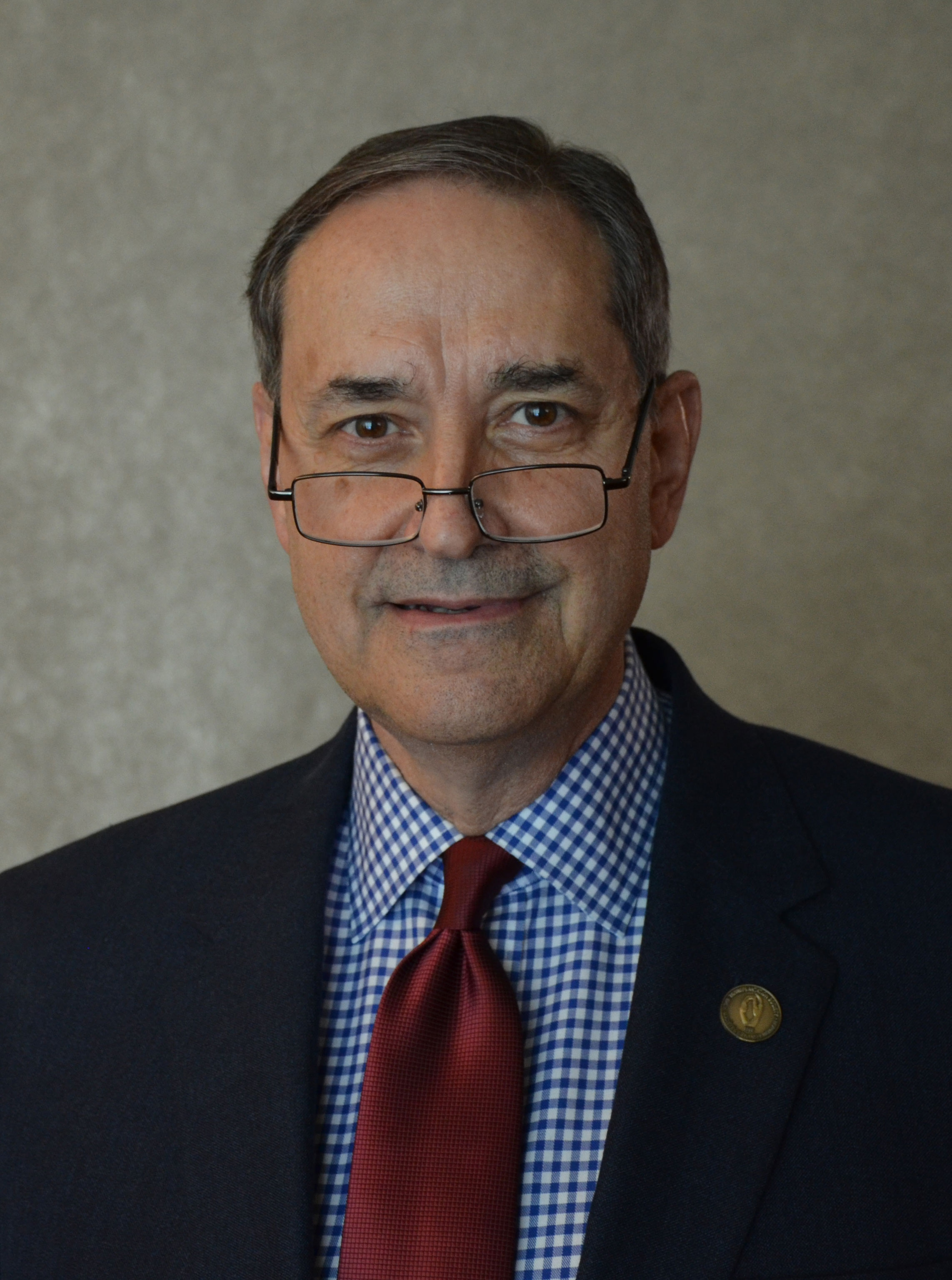
- Born: 1945 (age 80–81); Queens, New York
- Citizenship: United States of America
- Education: George Washington University; Virginia Commonwealth University
- Known for: Organ Transplant Surgery
- Awards: NKF Hume Lifetime Achievement Award; AST Senior Achievement Award in Clinical Transplantation; AOPO The President's Award; TTS Medawar Prize
- Scientific career
- Workplaces: Massachusetts General Hospital New England Donor Services

Francis Leo Delmonico (born in New York in 1945) is a retired American surgeon, clinical professor and health expert in the field of transplantation. He served on numerous national and international committees regarding donation and transplant and is affiliated with various leading organizations and institutions. In addition to his work as a transplant surgeon, he served as chief medical officer of the New England Donor Services (NEDS) and Professor of Surgery, Part-Time at Harvard Medical School in Boston, Massachusetts, where he is emeritus director of renal transplantation. He is the author or co-author on over 300 academic papers.

He served as president of The Transplantation Society (TTS) from 2012 to 2014, an international non-profit organization based in Montreal, Canada that works with international transplantation physicians and researchers. He also served as the president of the United Network of Organ Sharing (UNOS) in 2005 which overseas the practice of organ donation and transplantation in the United States. He was appointed and still serves as an advisor to the World Health Organization in matters of organ donation and transplantation. He was appointed by Pope Francis to the Pontifical Academy of Sciences in 2016.

== Education ==
Delmonico received a Bachelor of Science degree in biology at Mount Saint Mary's College in 1966 and a Doctor of Medicine degree from George Washington University in 1971. His initial general surgical training was under the direction of pioneer transplant surgeon Dr. David Hume at the Medical College of Virginia. In 1974, Delmonico interrupted his general surgical training to complete a two-year Clinical and Research Fellowship in Transplantation at the Massachusetts General Hospital. He then returned to the Medical College of Virginia to continue his general surgical residency training, which he completed in 1978 as chief resident in surgery.

== Career ==
After serving for two years in the United States Navy as a staff surgeon at Walter Reed Medical Center, an assistant professor of surgery at the Uniformed Services University School of Medicine, and as ship's surgeon on the USS Independence, Delmonico was recruited to the Massachusetts General Hospital in 1980 as a member of the transplantation unit of the department of surgery. He was promoted to visiting surgeon in 1997 and to professor of surgery at the Harvard Medical School in 2000. From 1990 until 2004 he was the director of the Renal Transplantation Service at the Massachusetts General Hospital. Throughout his time at Mass General, he has devoted much of his research efforts to clinical investigation. In the early part of his career, he focused upon the management of recipient immunosuppression and more recently upon the clinical parameters that define the suitable organ donor.

In 1995, Delmonico was appointed medical director of the New England Organ Bank, now New England Donor Services. Under his direction, NEDS has undertaken several research projects, most notably an outcome study of organs transplanted from deceased donors who were bacteremic at the time of their death. This study removed a heretofore absolute contraindication to organ donation, thereby expanding the organ donor pool for selected allograft recipients. Another focus of Delmonico's organ donor interest has been the concept of death. He has been responsible for the development of the Donation after Cardiac Death initiative in transplant centers within the NEDS service area. He was awarded a Department of Health and Human Services Grant as the principal investigator of a project to study the acceptance of kidneys recovered from deceased expanded criteria donors and has served as the medical advisor to the Association of Organ Procurement Organizations.

Delmonico has served on the board of trustees and numerous committees of the United Network for Organ Sharing (UNOS) and as its President. UNOS is the contractor for the Organ Procurement and Transplant Network (OPTN), the federally designated organization that oversees the practice of transplantation in the United States.

His contributions to The Transplantation Society (TTS) have been long-standing. As chairman of TTS's ethics committee, he convened an international forum on the live kidney donor in Amsterdam, Netherlands, in April 2004, and on the lung, liver, intestine and pancreas donor in Vancouver, Canada, in September 2005, with participation of over 100 physicians and surgeons from 44 countries around the world. Furthermore, he served as TTS's director of medical affairs from 2006 to 2010 and president from 2012 to 2014. In 2020, he received the Society's highest distinction in being awarded the Medawar Prize for his lifetime contribution to the field of transplantation.

He works closely with the World Health Organization who made him a WHO consultant on matter of human organ donation and transplantation. In 2008, he was responsible for convening the Istanbul Summit from which the Declaration of Istanbul on Organ Trafficking and Transplant Tourism was derived. He became executive director the Declaration of Istanbul Custodian Group in 2015.

== Writings ==
He has authored or co-authored more than 300 publications, either as original articles, reviews, commentaries or book chapters. His original writings have been published in the New England Journal of Medicine, the Journal of the American Medical Association and The New York Times. He has appeared on numerous television and radio programs, including PBS, Nightline, Good Morning America, CBS Sunday Morning and NPR news. Other educational achievements include his work as associate editor of the American Journal of Transplantation and his reviews for many medical journals such as the Journal of the American Medical Association, the Journal of the American Association of Nephrology, and Surgery. He was a member of the editorial board of Transplantation, Kidney International and Clinical Transplantation.

== Awards and recognition ==
- 2020: Medawar Prize, The Transplantation Society

== Selected publications ==
- Delmonico, Francis L.; Snydman, David R. (March 1998). "ORGAN DONOR SCREENING FOR INFECTIOUS DISEASES: Review of Practice and Implications for Transplantation". Transplantation. 65 (5): 603–610. doi:10.1097/00007890-199803150-00001. ISSN 0041-1337. PMID 9521191.
- Delmonico, Francis L.; Harmon, William E.; Lorber, Marc I.; Goguen, Jane; Mah, Helen; Himmelfarb, Jonathan; Lipkowitz, George; Valliere, Shauneen; Bow, Laurine; Milford, Edgar L.; Rohrer, Richard J. (January 1999). "A New Allocation Plan for Renal Transplantation". Transplantation. 67 (2): 303–309. doi:10.1097/00007890-199901270-00021. ISSN 0041-1337. PMID 10075599.
- Delmonico, Francis L.; Arnold, Robert; Scheper-Hughes, Nancy; Siminoff, Laura A.; Kahn, Jeffrey; Youngner, Stuart J. (2002-06-20). "Ethical Incentives — Not Payment — For Organ Donation". New England Journal of Medicine. 346 (25): 2002–2005. doi:10.1056/NEJMsb013216. ISSN 0028-4793. PMID 12075064.
- Rosengard, Bruce R.; Feng, Sandy; Alfrey, Edward J.; Zaroff, Jonathan G.; Emond, Jean C.; Henry, Mitchell L.; Garrity, Edward R.; Roberts, John P.; Wynn, James J.; Metzger, Robert A.; Freeman, Richard B.; Port, Friedrich K.; Merion, Robert M.; Love, Robert B.; Busuttil, Ronald W. (September 2002). "Report of the Crystal City Meeting to Maximize the Use of Organs Recovered from the Cadaver Donor". American Journal of Transplantation. 2 (8): 701–711. doi:10.1034/j.1600-6143.2002.20804.x. PMID 12243491.
- Metzger, Robert A.; Delmonico, Francis L.; Feng, Sandy; Port, Friedrich K.; Wynn, James J.; Merion, Robert M. (2003). "Expanded criteria donors for kidney transplantation". American Journal of Transplantation. 3: 114–125. doi:10.1034/j.1600-6143.3.s4.11.x. PMID 12694055.
- Delmonico, Francis L.; Morrissey, Paul E.; Lipkowitz, George S.; Stoff, Jeffrey S.; Himmelfarb, Jonathan; Harmon, William; Pavlakis, Martha; Mah, Helen; Goguen, Jane; Luskin, Richard; Milford, Edgar; Basadonna, Giacomo; Chobanian, Michael; Bouthot, Beth; Lorber, Marc (October 2004). "Donor Kidney Exchanges". American Journal of Transplantation. 4 (10): 1628–1634. doi:10.1111/j.1600-6143.2004.00572.x. PMID 15367217.
- Delmonico, Francis L. (2004-04-29). "Exchanging Kidneys — Advances in Living-Donor Transplantation". New England Journal of Medicine. 350 (18): 1812–1814. doi:10.1056/NEJMp038228. ISSN 0028-4793. PMID 15115826.
- Delmonico, Francis; Council of the Transplantation Society (2005-03-27). "A Report of the Amsterdam Forum On the Care of the Live Kidney Donor: Data and Medical Guidelines". Transplantation. 79 (6 Suppl): S53–66. doi:10.1097/01.TP.0000157343.27949.9F. ISSN 0041-1337. PMID 15785361.
- Bernat, J.L.; D'Alessandro, A.M.; Port, F.K.; Bleck, T.P.; Heard, S.O.; Medina, J.; Rosenbaum, S.H.; DeVita, M.A.; Gaston, R.S.; Merion, R.M.; Barr, M.L.; Marks, W.H.; Nathan, H.; O'Connor, K.; Rudow, D.L. (2006). "Report of a National Conference on Donation after Cardiac Death". American Journal of Transplantation. 6 (2): 281–291. doi:10.1111/j.1600-6143.2005.01194.x. PMID 16426312.
- Delmonico, F.-L.; Dew, M.-A. (2007). "Living donor kidney transplantation in a global environment". Kidney International. 71 (7): 608–614. doi:10.1038/sj.ki.5002125. PMID 17290291.
- Dew, M.A.; Jacobs, C.L.; Jowsey, S.G.; Hanto, R.; Miller, C.; Delmonico, F.L. (2007). "Guidelines for the Psychosocial Evaluation of Living Unrelated Kidney Donors in the United States". American Journal of Transplantation. 7 (5): 1047–1054. doi:10.1111/j.1600-6143.2007.01751.x. PMID 17359510.
- DuBois, James M.; Delmonico, Francis L.; D'Alessandro, Anthony M. (2007). "When organ donors are still patients: is premortem use of heparin ethically acceptable?". American Journal of Critical Care. 16 (4): 396–400. doi:10.4037/ajcc2007.16.4.396. ISSN 1062-3264. PMID 17595373.
- Saidi, R. F.; Elias, N.; Kawai, T.; Hertl, M.; Farrell, M.-L.; Goes, N.; Wong, W.; Hartono, C.; Fishman, J. A.; Kotton, C. N.; Tolkoff-Rubin, N.; Delmonico, F. L.; Cosimi, A. B.; Ko, D. S. C. (2007). "Outcome of kidney transplantation using expanded criteria donors and donation after cardiac death kidneys: realities and costs". American Journal of Transplantation. 7 (12): 2769–2774. doi:10.1111/j.1600-6143.2007.01993.x. ISSN 1600-6135. PMID 17927805.
- Sung, R. S.; Christensen, L. L.; Leichtman, A. B.; Greenstein, S. M.; Distant, D. A.; Wynn, J. J.; Stegall, M. D.; Delmonico, F. L.; Port, F. K. (2008). "Determinants of discard of expanded criteria donor kidneys: impact of biopsy and machine perfusion". American Journal of Transplantation. 8 (4): 783–792. doi:10.1111/j.1600-6143.2008.02157.x. hdl:2027.42/73820. ISSN 1600-6143. PMID 18294347.
- Delmonico, Francis L. (2008). "The development of the Declaration of Istanbul on Organ Trafficking and Transplant Tourism". Nephrology, Dialysis, Transplantation. 23 (11): 3381–3382. doi:10.1093/ndt/gfn552. ISSN 1460-2385. PMID 18922862.
- Delmonico, Francis L.; McBride, Maureen A. (2008-12-27). "Analysis of the wait list and deaths among candidates waiting for a kidney transplant". Transplantation. 86 (12): 1678–1683. doi:10.1097/TP.0b013e31818fe694. ISSN 1534-6080. PMID 19104404.
- Hanto, Ruthanne L.; Reitsma, William; Delmonico, Francis L. (2008-12-27). "The development of a successful multiregional kidney paired donation program". Transplantation. 86 (12): 1744–1748. doi:10.1097/TP.0b013e3181909035. ISSN 1534-6080. PMID 19104415.
- Tilney, Nicholas; Murray, Joseph; Thistlethwaite, Richard; Norman, Doug; Delmonico, Francis; Hanto, Douglas; Leichtman, Alan; Danovitch, Gabriel; Sayegh, Mohamed; Shapiro, Ron; Harmon, William; Salvatierra, Oscar; Brennan, Dan; McDiarmid, Sue; Stock, Peter (2009-09-27). "Promotion of Altruistic Donation". Transplantation. 88 (6): 847. doi:10.1097/TP.0b013e3181b6bd65. ISSN 0041-1337. PMID 19920786.
- Delmonico, Francis L. (2013-07-15). "A Welcomed New National Policy in China". Transplantation. 96 (1): 3–4. doi:10.1097/TP.0b013e31829949fb. ISSN 0041-1337. PMID 23743729.
- Capron, Alexander M.; Danovitch, Gabriel M.; Delmonico, Francis L. (2014-10-03). "Organ Markets: Problems Beyond Harms to Vendors". The American Journal of Bioethics. 14 (10): 23–25. doi:10.1080/15265161.2014.947048. ISSN 1526-5161. PMID 25229575.
- Alkuwari, Hanan; Fadhil, Riadh; Almaslamani, Yousef; Alansari, Abdalla; Almalki, Hassan; Khalaf, Hatem; Ali, Omar (2014-01-15). "The Doha Donation Accord Aligned With the Declaration of Istanbul: Implementations to Develop Deceased Organ Donation and Combat Commercialism". Transplantation. 97 (1): 3–4. doi:10.1097/01.TP.0000437564.15965.2e. ISSN 0041-1337. PMID 24378648.
