= Benjamin Neale =

Statistical geneticist

- Education: University of Chicago; Virginia Commonwealth University (B.Sc., 2006); King's College London (Ph.D., 2009)
- Known for: Psychiatric genetics
- Awards: Leena Peltonen Prize for Excellence in Human Genetics (2016)
- Scientific career
- Fields: Human genetics Statistical genetics
- Institutions: Broad Institute; Harvard Medical School; Massachusetts General Hospital
- Website: www.nealelab.is

Benjamin Michael Neale is a statistical geneticist with a specialty in psychiatric genetics. He is an institute member at the Broad Institute as well as an associate professor at both Harvard Medical School and the Analytic and Translational Genetics Unit at Massachusetts General Hospital. Neale specializes in genome-wide association studies (GWAS). He was responsible for the data analysis of the first GWAS on attention-deficit/hyperactivity-disorder, and he developed new analysis software such as PLINK, which allows for whole-genome data to be analyzed for specific gene markers. Related to his work on GWAS, Neale is the lead of the ADHD psychiatric genetics and also a member of the Psychiatric GWAS Consortium analysis committee.

== Education ==
Neale's academic background includes a Genetics Bachelor's of Science degree from the University of Chicago and a Ph.D. in human genetics from King's College. His postdoctoral project was done in the laboratory of Mark Daly at Massachusetts General Hospital. Neale was recently awarded the 2020 Early-Career Award by the American Society of Human Genetics for his emphasis on using statistical methodology in his research analyses.

== Research ==
Neale has published work on autism and genetic contributions to disease. In 2010, Neale wrote about the function of the hepatic lipase gene, LIPC. The experiment found an association between advanced age-related macular degeneration (AMD), which is the main culprit of late onset blindness, and genetic variants in LIPC of the high-density lipoprotein cholesterol (HDL) pathway. The strongest association was found for rs10468017, which correlated with a protective, HDL-increasing effect of the T allele involved in AMD. Weaker associations were found for other LIPC loci ABCA1 and FADS1-3. The impact of this research lies in its examination of previously unthought-of pathways involved in the development of AMD.

In 2014, Neale contributed to a paper on the design of scientific disease studies focusing on uncommon genetic variants. The article included the operationalization of variables, advice on sample size, discussion of alleles and their frequencies, and information on noncoding and regions of the genome.

That same year, he contributed on a paper examining the gene variant that allows for the experience of euphoria when taking d-amphetamine and connecting it to decreased risk for developing schizophrenia and ADHD. In particular, the research found increased expression, or enrichment, of certain alleles associated with increased sensitivity to amphetamine-induced euphoria and decreased sensitivity to developing schizophrenia and ADHD. This work opens new possibilities to use the alleles that demonstrated changes in expression in order to analyze risk for developing neurological disorders that involve dopamine. Dopamine is the chemical in d-amphetamine that is responsible for its euphoric effects, and some disorders such as schizophrenia involve abnormal dopamine levels, though other factors are involved.

Neale has also researched influences on behaviors indicative of autism, namely that of de novo and familial factors. The purpose of the study was to analyze IQ scores, assessments of behavior and language, spontaneous loss of function mutations, and familial history of mental illness. The study found a negative association between IQ scores and spontaneous loss of function mutation rates, and a positive association between IQ scores and family history of mental illness. This study suggests family history of mental illness could play a more influential role than previously thought in the phenotypic and genetic manifestations of autism.

In 2022, Neale co-published a study which linked potential genetic variants with bipolar disorder, saying "the long-term hope is that the genetic discoveries can form the basis of better understanding of the underlying biological processes that are involved in bipolar disorder".

== Awards ==
In 2016, Neale received the second Leena Peltonen Prize for Excellence in Human Genetics from the Paulo Foundation in Finland. Neale was given the award in recognition of his work in the fields of statistical and psychiatric genetics. This has included research on the genetics of psychiatric disorders such as schizophrenia, major depression, and autism.

== Personal life ==
Neale is openly gay.
