= Grace E. Harris =

American university administrator

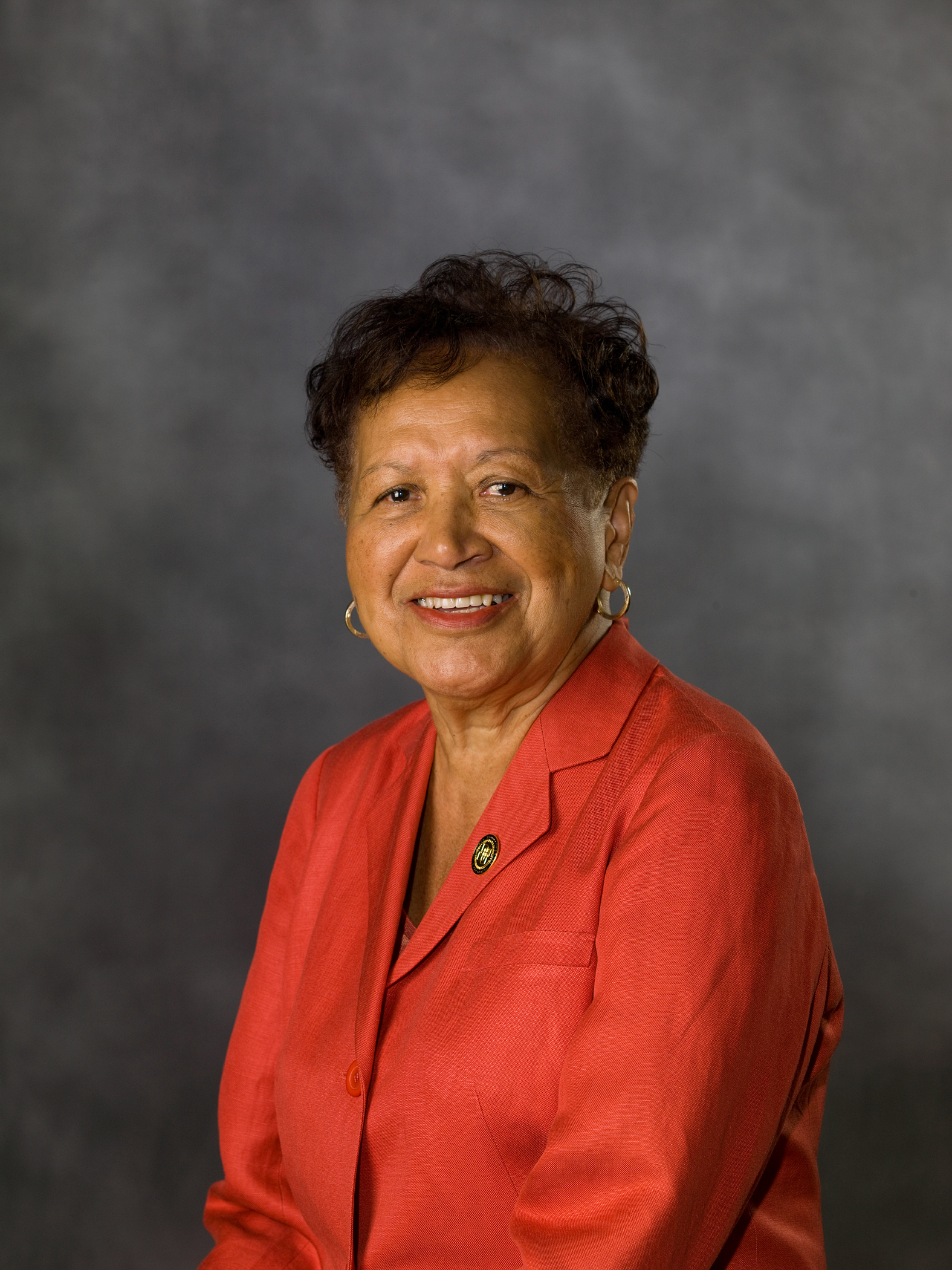
Grace E. Harris in 2008

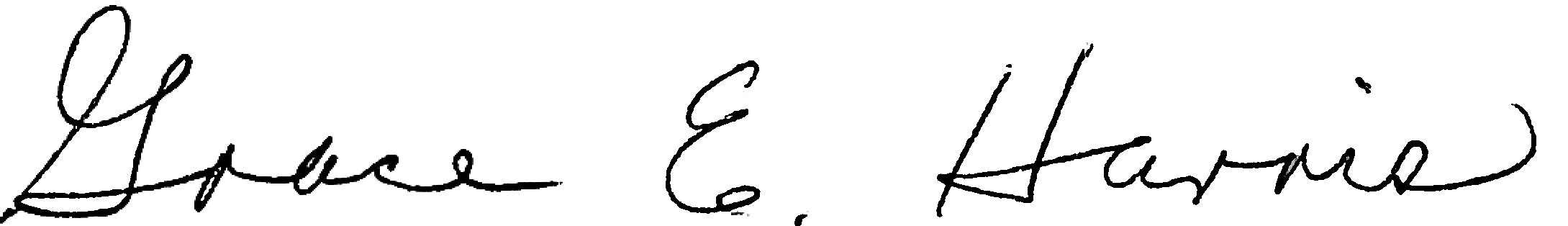
Grace Harris Signature

Grace E. Harris. (July 1, 1933 – February 12, 2018), was an administrator at Virginia Commonwealth University.

Harris was one of the first African American faculty members hired by Virginia Commonwealth University in 1967, which initially rejected her admission on the basis of race, when it was known as Richmond Professional Institute (RPI), when she was a graduate student in 1954. She would later rise through the ranks at the university to become Dean, Provost, and Acting President on two occasions, becoming the highest-ranking African American and highest-ranking woman in VCU's history.

Harris had formerly been employed as a social worker, supervisor, and executive director in public and nonprofit social service agencies in Hampton and Richmond, VA. Active in community organizations in the Richmond area, Harris has served on numerous boards, task forces, and commissions. She served on the advisory board of the Virginia Health Care Foundation and the Virginia Commission on Higher Education Appointments, of which she has been a member since its establishment by former Gov. Mark Warner in 2002. She also was vice chair of Warner's transition team — Put Virginia First.

== Early life and education ==
Born Grace Victoria Edmondson, Grace was named after her maternal aunt, Grace Ewell Harris, who had also eventually married a Harris. Growing up, Harris' parents and grandparents were teachers and preachers. Grace's father, Elisha Edmondson, was a science teacher at the high school in Halifax, which was, until 1969, a segregated school. The name Edmondson is allegedly derived from Edmonds, the name of a white family in the Halifax area who were once slave owners of Harris' ancestors. Grace's father held graduate degrees, as well, in science. Her mother, Elizabeth (Ewell) Edmondson, was an elementary school teacher. Her maternal grandmother was an elementary school teacher, and her grandfather was a minister. Her great-grandfather was the founder of The Piney Grove Baptist Church in Halifax County, Virginia. Grace was the third child amongst six siblings. She has five sisters, the late Sue E. Wilder, a data analyst at NASA for 35 years and one of the agency's Hidden Figures, Marian Brazziel, Elizabeth Soares, Mamye BaCote, a former member of the Virginia House of Delegates, and Lola Sadler, as well as one brother, William Edmondson.

Grace graduated high school from Halifax Training School in 1950, where she was class valedictorian. Halifax Training School, located in South Boston, a town in Halifax County, Virginia, was once a school created solely for African American students when schools were segregated in the county.

Harris spent a semester at Grinnell College in 1952 as an exchange student from Hampton Institute, a historically black college in Virginia. She was involved in a program designed to promote interracial understanding at both schools. She was one of five African Americans at the school at that time. Harris received her Bachelor of Science degree in sociology from Hampton Institute, now Hampton University, graduating with highest honors. Harris was originally denied admission to Richmond Professional Institute in 1954 on the basis of race. Due to race relations in the state at this time, African American graduate students were offered assistance to attend public institutions out of state as part of an arrangement made by the state of Virginia. Harris went on to attend Boston University from 1954 to 1955, where Martin Luther King Jr. was among her classmates. She would later attend Richmond Professional Institute, now known as Virginia Commonwealth University, to complete her Master of Social Work degree in 1960. She received Master of Arts and Doctor of Philosophy degrees in sociology from the University of Virginia in 1974 and 1975, respectively.

== Career ==
=== Academic Appointments and other Significant Work Experiences ===
Beginning her career in 1955, Harris worked as a caseworker in Hampton, Virginia in the Department of Public Welfare until 1957, and eventually a caseworker and Supervisor in the Department of Welfare and Institutions in Richmond, Virginia, until 1963. In 1963, Harris went on to become executive director of the Friends' Association for Children, Richmond, Virginia, a position she held for three years. In the year following, she was Director of the Richmond Community Action Program.

From 1967 to 1976, Harris served as assistant professor in the School of Social Work at Virginia Commonwealth University, the university that initially rejected her admission in 1954. During her last year as assistant professor, Harris was Director of Student Affairs in the School of Social Work. In 1976, Harris became associate professor in the School of Social Work. Two years later, while associate professor, Grace was named Associate Dean of the School of Social Work at Virginia Commonwealth University, a role she maintained for two years, until 1980. In the year following, she was named Fellow in Academic Administration for the American Council on Education, which was an Internship with President and Vice President for Academic Affairs at Virginia Commonwealth University. In 1981, Harris became Professor and Associate Dean in the School of Social Work, a position she held for a year, until 1982. For eight years following, she was Dean and Professor in the School of Social Work at Virginia Commonwealth University. In 1990, she was named Vice Provost for Continuing Studies & Public Service. In 1993, she moved on to become Provost and Vice President for Academic Affairs. During the summer of 1995, she was named acting President of Virginia Commonwealth University, and then once again in 1998.

Following her retirement from her position as Provost and Vice President for Academic Affairs in 1999, Dr. Grace E. Harris was named Director of the Grace E. Harris Leadership Institute. Additionally, she served as a distinguished professor at the institute, before stepping down in 2015.

==== Personal life ====
Harris met her husband, James W. "Dick" Harris in College at Hampton Institute, and married in the summer after graduation, in July 1954. She has two children.

==== Awards and recognition ====
- 1952 Exchange Student, Grinnell College, Grinnell, Iowa
- 1954 Alpha Kappa Mu Honor Society Who's Who in American Colleges and Universities
- 1954-1955 United Negro College Fund Fellowship, Boston University
- 1959-1960 Virginia Department of Public Welfare Graduate Scholarship
- 1972-1974 Phelps Stokes Fellow, University of Virginia Ford Foundation Fellow, University of Virginia
- 1975 Lychnos Honorary Society, University of Virginia
- 1980-1981 American Council on Education Fellow in Academic Administration
- 1984 Outstanding Woman in Ed., Greater Richmond Metropolitan Area
- 1989 Alumna of the Year Award, School of Social Work, VCU
- 1990 Educator of the Year Award, National Coalition of 100 Black Women, Richmond Chapter
- 1991 Recipient of Knee/Whitman Award, National Assoc. of Social Workers
- 1992 VCU Women's Network- Women's Hall of Fame Award
- 1994 Delta Upsilon chapter of the Phi Beta Sigma fraternity, Woman of the Year Award for Outstanding Service to the Virginia Commonwealth University Community
- 1995 Honorary Doctor of Humane Letters degree, Virginia Union University
- 1995 Flame Bearer of Education Award, United Negro College Fund
- 1997 Virginia Power "Strong Men and Women: Excellence in Leadership Award
- 1998 The Council of the Virginia Museum of Fine Arts "Virginia Women of Style and Substance "Award
- 1999 Presidential Award for Community Multicultural Enrichment and the Riese-Melton Award, VCU
- 1999 Honorary Doctor of Social Service degree, University of Richmond
- 1999 Presidential Medallion Award, Virginia Commonwealth University
- 2010 Alumni Award, Grinnell College
- 2015 Honorary Doctorate Degree, College of William & Mary
- 2016 Richmond Times-Dispatch's Person of the Year Hall of Fame inductee
- 2018 VCU L. Douglas Wilder School of Government and Public Affairs Excellence in Virginia Government Awards, Lifetime Achievement [awarded posthumously]

==== Legacy ====
The VCU Board of Visitors established The Grace E. Harris Leadership Institute in May 1999 to honor her 32 years of exemplary service to the university and her retirement as Provost and Vice President of Academic Affairs.

In December 2007, the former Virginia Commonwealth University School of Business building at 1015 Floyd Ave. was named Grace E. Harris Hall in her honor.
