= Michael L. Madigan =

American biomedical engineer

Michael L. Madigan is an American biomedical engineer.

Madigan earned bachelor's and master's degrees in bioengineering from Texas A&M University in 1994 and 1996, respectively, followed by a doctorate in the subject at Virginia Commonwealth University in 2001. Maidgan began his teaching career at Virginia Tech upon completing his Ph.D. Between 2014 and 2017, he was a professor at Texas A&M University. He returned to Virginia Tech in 2017, and became editor of the Journal of Applied Biomechanics that year.
