= Howard Owen =

American author (born 1949)

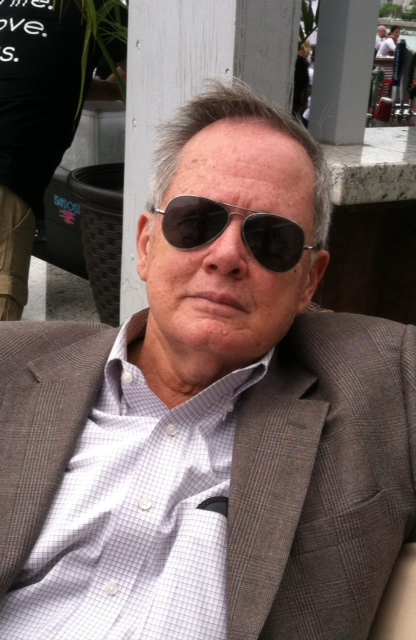
- Owen in 2017
- Born: March 1, 1949 (age 77); Fayetteville, North Carolina, U.S.
- Education: University of North Carolina at Chapel Hill; Virginia Commonwealth University (MA)
- Occupations: Author; sports editor
- Years active: 1971–present
- Spouse: Karen Van Neste (m. 1973)
- Writing career
- Genres: Mystery and thriller fiction
- Notable awards: Theresa Pollak Award for Words; Hammett Prize

Howard Owen (born March 1, 1949) is an American author. He is a writer of literary fiction, mystery, and thrillers. He was the winner of the 2012 Hammett Prize awarded annually by the International Association of Crime Writers.

== Books by Howard Owen and their reception ==
Littlejohn (1992) was the first novel by Owen, and he was 40 years old when it was first published by Permanent Press in 1989. It was followed by Fat Lightning in 1994 and Answers to Lucky (1996).

His fourth novel, The Measured Man, was published in hardcover by HarperCollins in 1997. It was praised in The New York Times, the Los Angeles Times, Publishers Weekly, Kirkus Reviews, the Raleigh News & Observer, the Orlando Sentinel, and the Fort Lauderdale Sun-Sentinel. Chosen as one of the Los Angeles Times Book Reviews' "Recommended Titles" for 1997, it was also included in The Best Novels of the Nineties: A Reader's Guide.

His fifth novel, Harry and Ruth, was published by The Permanent Press in September 2000 to critical acclaim from Kirkus Reviews, Publishers Weekly and various weekly publications.

His sixth novel, The Rail, was published in April 2002. It is about (among other things) baseball and the parable of the talents. His seventh novel, Turn Signal, came out in 2004 and was a Booksense selection for July 2004. His eighth novel, Rock of Ages, is a sequel to his first novel, Littlejohn. It was a Booksense pick for July 2006. His ninth novel, The Reckoning,' about ghosts of the '60s, came out in late 2010 and received very positive reviews from, among others, Publishers Weekly and the New York Journal of Books.

An Owen short story, "The Thirteenth Floor," part of Richmond Noir, a mystery and crime anthology edited by Tom De Haven and Brian Castleberry with a foreword by Tom Robbins, came out in early 2010. The protagonist of "The Thirteenth Floor," Willie Black, is also at the center of Owen's 10th novel, Oregon Hill,' which was published in July 2012 to positive reviews in The New York Times, Publishers Weekly, and Kirkus Reviews. Oregon Hill has also been released as an audio book. Willie became a central character in future Owen novels: The Philadelphia Quarry (2013), Parker Field (2014) and The Bottom (2015). The fifth of the Willie Black novels, Grace, was published in 2016. The Devil's Triangle (The sixth novel in the Willie Black series) is scheduled for release in 2017. As the seventh book in the Willie Black Series, it was followed by Scuffletown.

Regarding Oregon Hill, a New York Times critic said Howard Owen is "a writer we can't wait to hear again. . . .Owen knows his setting, his dialogue is spot-on, and his grasp of the down-and-dirty work of the police and news reporters lends authenticity to the narrative. This is Southern literature as expected, with a touch of noir and with a touch of Dennis Lehane's Mystic River." Another writer in The New York Times Sunday Book Review said, "Owen has recruited his sick, sad and creatively crazy characters from a rough neighborhood cut off from the rest of the city when the expressway was built. If anyone is watching out for the forgotten citizens of Oregon Hill, it's Willie, who grew up there and speaks the local language, a crisp and colorful urban idiom we can't wait to hear again."

Littlejohn was nominated for the (American Booksellers Association) Abbey Award and the (Barnes & Noble) Discovery award for best new fiction. Littlejohn has sold more than 50,000 copies and has been printed in Japanese, French and Korean. The book has also been a Doubleday Book Club selection, and audio and large-print editions have been issued. Movie option rights for the book have been sold. All his subsequent books have continued this initial popularity and have garnered additional awards and favorable reviews. Owen's books are available online. Most of his 11 Willie Black mysteries (Oregon Hill, The Philadelphia Quarry, Parker Field, The Bottom, Grace, The Devil’s Triangle, Scuffletown, Evergreen, Belle Isle, Jordan’s Branch andMonument) also are available as audio books. The Willie Black series is being reprinted in Italian by NNeditore. Publishers Weekly, in a starred review, calledMonument “Owen’s exceptional 11thmystery” and added “Owen has outdone himself.”

== Biography ==
Howard Owen was born March 1, 1949, in Fayetteville, North Carolina. He and his wife since 1973, Karen Van Neste Owen (the former publisher of Van Neste Books), live in Richmond, Virginia, a city which is the setting for most of his writing and the residence of one of his favorite fictional characters, Willie Black.

He was a 1971 journalism graduate from the University of North Carolina at Chapel Hill, and he earned a master's degree in English from Virginia Commonwealth University in 1981.

Owen was a sports editor at The Richmond Times-Dispatch and editorial page editor of the Free Lance-Star in Fredericksburg, Virginia. He retired in 2015 after 44 years as a reporter and editor. While a working journalist, he wrote his first novel, Littlejohn, in 1989, when he was 40. Littlejohn was bought by The Permanent Press and published in 1992. Random House bought it from The Permanent Press and reissued it as a Villard (imprint) hardcover in 1993 and a Vintage Contemporary paperback in 1994.

In 2002 Owen won Richmond Magazine's Theresa Pollak Award for Words. He was awarded the Hammett Prize in 2012. He appeared at the Carytown, Richmond, Virginia, book store Chop Suey Books and on a Channel Six CBS "Virginia This Morning" televised interview in 2012. He was a featured guest at the "Festival of the Written Word" in Chesterfield, Virginia in 2015. In 2017 Owen was the honored author at the Virginia Commonwealth University annual Monroe Scholars Book and Author Luncheon, at which he was introduced by fellow novelist Tom De Haven.

A July 12, 2017 cover story, "Richmond Noir: Author Howard Owen's hard-bitten reporter roams our streets for the sixth time" by Jackie Kruszewski, was featured in Style Weekly magazine.
