= Mary Cynthia Farach-Carson =

American biochemist

Mary C. (Cindy) Farach-Carson
- Born: Galveston, Texas, U.S.
- Education: University of South Carolina (BS); Virginia Commonwealth University (PhD)
- Scientific career
- Fields: Biochemistry
- Workplaces: UTHealth Houston School of Dentistry; Rice University; University of Delaware
- Thesis: Molecular aspects of biological modulation of acetylcholine receptor function (1982)
- Doctoral advisor: Marino Martinez-Carrion

Mary Cynthia (Cindy) Farach-Carson is an American biochemist whose research concerns the extracellular matrix, the proteoglycan perlecan, tissue engineering, and bone metastasis. She is a professor of diagnostic and biomedical sciences and associate dean for research at the UTHealth Houston School of Dentistry.

== Early life and education ==
Farach-Carson is a native of Galveston, Texas. She received a Bachelor of Science degree in biology, magna cum laude, from the University of South Carolina in 1978 and a PhD in biochemistry from the Medical College of Virginia at Virginia Commonwealth University in 1982. She was a postdoctoral fellow in biochemistry at the Medical College of Virginia, in physiological chemistry at Johns Hopkins University, and in biochemistry and molecular biology at the University of Texas MD Anderson Cancer Center.

== Career ==
After a year at Baylor College of Medicine, Farach-Carson joined the faculty of the University of Texas Health Science Center at Houston Dental Branch, where she became an associate professor of basic sciences. In 1998 she moved to the University of Delaware as a professor of biological sciences and materials science. There she was founding director of the Center for Translational Cancer Research, an alliance that included the university, the Helen F. Graham Cancer Center at Christiana Care, and the Nemours/Alfred I. duPont Hospital for Children.

She joined Rice University in 2009 as its first associate vice provost for research and a professor of biochemistry and cell biology. In 2011 she became the first scientific director of Rice's BioScience Research Collaborative and was named vice provost for translational bioscience. She became a strategic advisor to the Texas Medical Center in 2014.

In 2016 Farach-Carson returned to the renamed UTHealth School of Dentistry, where she is a professor in the Department of Diagnostic and Biomedical Sciences, director of clinical and translational research, and associate dean for research. She is also an adjunct professor at Rice University.

== Research ==
Farach-Carson's research concerns how extracellular matrix molecules function in healthy bone and how they contribute to diseases such as osteoporosis and cancer metastasis to bone. Her group has studied perlecan, a very large heparan sulfate proteoglycan also known as HSPG2. In a 2014 review, she and her co-authors concluded that the concentration of perlecan at borders between tissues is an ancient function of its core protein.

She also works on tissue engineering of the salivary gland. In 2012 she was principal investigator on a grant to grow replacement salivary glands from patients' own cells, aimed at people whose glands are destroyed by radiation therapy for head and neck cancer and who develop severe dry mouth (xerostomia).

With Felix Bronner, she is series editor of Topics in Bone Biology, a seven-volume series of review volumes published by Springer between 2004 and 2012.

== Awards and honors ==
In 2010 Farach-Carson was elected a fellow of the American Association for the Advancement of Science for contributions to bone physiology and to the promotion of interdisciplinary research. In 2018 she was inducted into the College of Fellows of the American Institute for Medical and Biological Engineering for developing three-dimensional systems that model normal and cancerous microtissues and for promoting interdisciplinary and translational research.

In 2021 she received the Stephen M. Krane Award of the American Society for Bone and Mineral Research, which recognizes research on inflammation or skeletal matrix biology. In 2023 the MD Anderson UTHealth Houston Graduate School of Biomedical Sciences gave her its D. Dudley and Judy White Oldham Faculty Award for service and leadership. In 2026 the International Association for Dental Research named her recipient of its Distinguished Scientist Award in Salivary Research.

== Selected publications ==
- Caffrey, J. M.; Farach-Carson, M. C. (1989). "Vitamin D3 metabolites modulate dihydropyridine-sensitive calcium currents in clonal rat osteosarcoma cells (ROS 17/2.8)". Journal of Biological Chemistry. 264 (34): 20265–20274. doi:10.1016/S0021-9258(19)47057-9. PMID 2479647.
- Gurski, Lisa A.; Jha, Amit K.; Zhang, Cindy; Jia, Xinqiao; Farach-Carson, Mary C. (2009). "Hyaluronic acid-based hydrogels as 3D matrices for in vitro evaluation of chemotherapeutic drugs using poorly adherent prostate cancer cells". Biomaterials. 30 (30): 6076–6085. doi:10.1016/j.biomaterials.2009.07.054. PMC 2758117. PMID 19698987.
- Farach-Carson, Mary C.; Warren, C. R.; Harrington, Daniel A.; Carson, Daniel D. (2014). "Border patrol: insights into the unique role of perlecan/heparan sulfate proteoglycan 2 at cell and tissue borders". Matrix Biology. 34: 64–79. doi:10.1016/j.matbio.2013.08.004. PMC 3938997. PMID 24001398.
- Pradhan-Bhatt, Swati; Harrington, Daniel A.; Duncan, Randall L.; Jia, Xinqiao; Witt, Robert L.; Farach-Carson, Mary C. (2013). "Implantable Three-Dimensional Salivary Spheroid Assemblies Demonstrate Fluid and Protein Secretory Responses to Neurotransmitters". Tissue Engineering Part A. 19 (13–14): 1610–1620. doi:10.1089/ten.tea.2012.0301. PMC 3665323. PMID 23442148.
