= Trudy Benson =

American painter (born 1985)

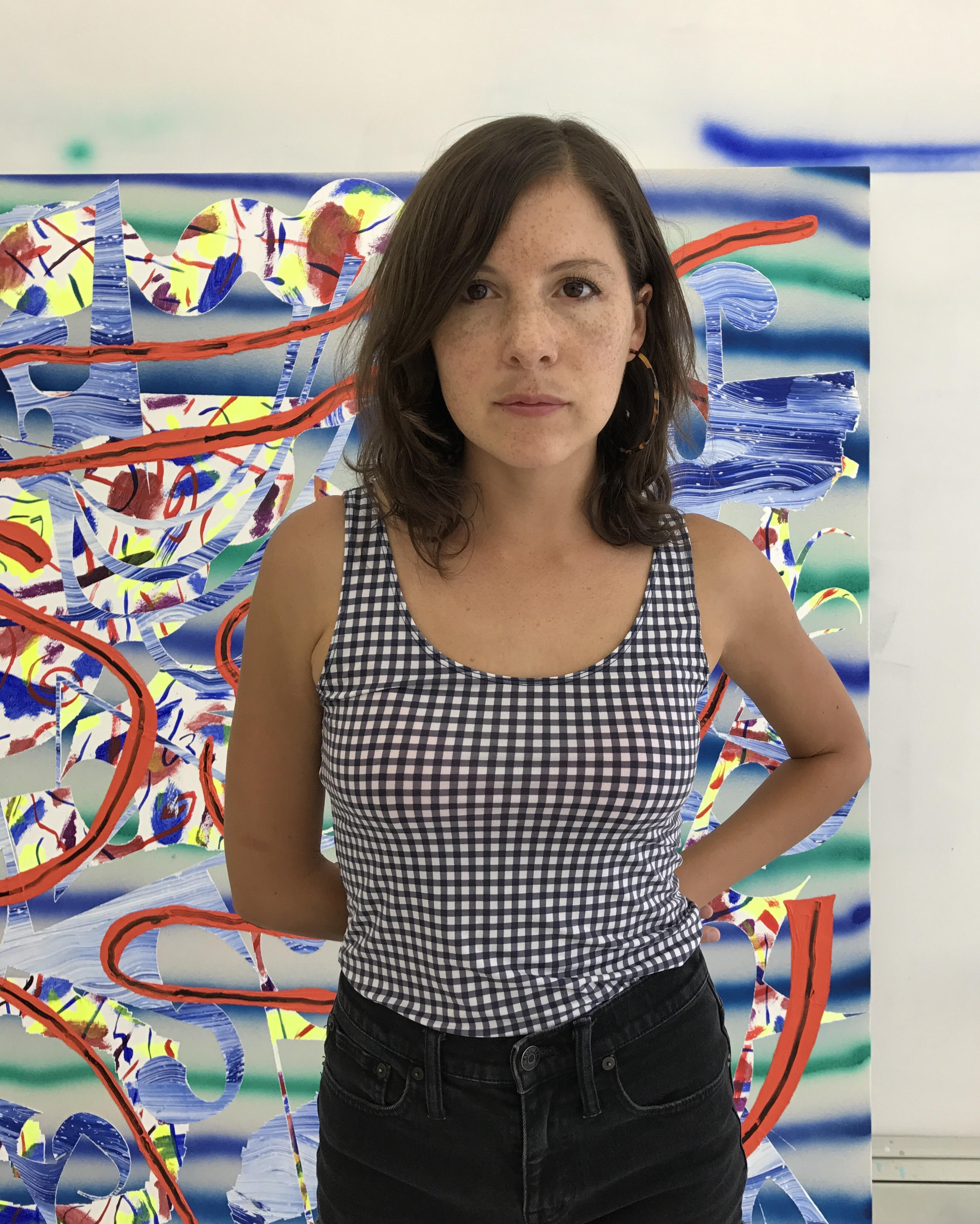
- Benson standing in front of her painting (2017)
- Born: April 3, 1985 (age 41); Richmond, Virginia
- Education: Pratt Institute, Virginia Commonwealth University
- Known for: Painting
- Website: trudybenson.com

Trudy Benson (born 1985) is an American abstract painter who lives and works in Brooklyn, NY.

== Early life and work ==
Trudy Benson was born in Richmond, Virginia, in 1985. She received a BFA from Virginia Commonwealth University in 2007 and an MFA from the Pratt Institute in Brooklyn, New York in 2010.

Benson is known for her large scale abstract paintings that utilize large swaths and globs of paint. Her style was influenced by early computer painting programs, such as MacPaint and Microsoft Paint. Critics have linked Benson's work to artistic movements such as abstract illusionism and Post-War New York Abstraction. Related painters include Hans Hoffman, Jonathan Lasker, Al Held, and Keltie Ferris.

== Critical reception ==
In December 2012, Scott Indrisek wrote for Modern Painters that, "This young Pratt-educated painter is moving away from her previous cartoonishly figurative efforts and toward a maximalist abstraction. The effect is a bit like a 1980s geometry textbook spazzing out and exploding on the wall. Benson works within a deliciously caffeinated language of gestures and shapes-the smear, the dripping line, rainbows, grids, circles-to create compositions that pair smooth, glossy sections with paint applied so thickly it resembles Play-Doh."

In May 2013, New York Times Art Critic Karen Rosenberg wrote that Benson's canvases resemble the proportions of early mac computers, and "mimic the squiggly, uncontrollable lines and seemingly miraculous instant color-fills of 1980s graphics programs like MacPaint." She went on to conclude, "There is a deliberate heaviness to her work, an impasto that no screen can yet evoke."

"Shapes of Things" at Lisa Cooley was described as a move "beyond the jokey use of tropes culled from computer-graphics programs" and a turn to drawing by Stephen Maine in the summer 2015 issue of ARTnews.

While critical of her overall show at Lyles & King in 2018, New York Times Art Critic Martha Schwendener, described an in situ installation made of spray paint and canvas as indicative of her best work. "Ragged and kind of punk, it reminds you of what made Ms. Benson’s art exciting in the first place when, armed with analog paint and digital thinking, she took on the history of painting and won a round."
