= Maxine L. Stitzer =

American research psychologist

- Education: University of Michigan
- Scientific career
- Fields: psychology; pharmacology
- Workplaces: Johns Hopkins School of Medicine
- Doctoral advisor: James H. Woods

Maxine L. Stitzer is an American research psychologist. She is an emeritus professor of the behavioral pharmacology research unit of Johns Hopkins School of Medicine in Baltimore, Maryland. She has been a professor at Johns Hopkins since 1992. Her principal research has been on the treatment of addiction using a contingency management approach.

== Publications ==
- Strain E., Stitzer M. (eds.) Methadone Treatment for Opioid Dependence. (1999). United Kingdom: Johns Hopkins University Press.

== Awards and recognition ==
- Nathan B. Eddy Award from the College on Problems of Drug Dependence (2019)
- The Award for Scientific Translation from the Society for the Advancement of Behavior Analysis (2013)
