= Beatrice Riese =

American abstract artist and collector (1917–2004)

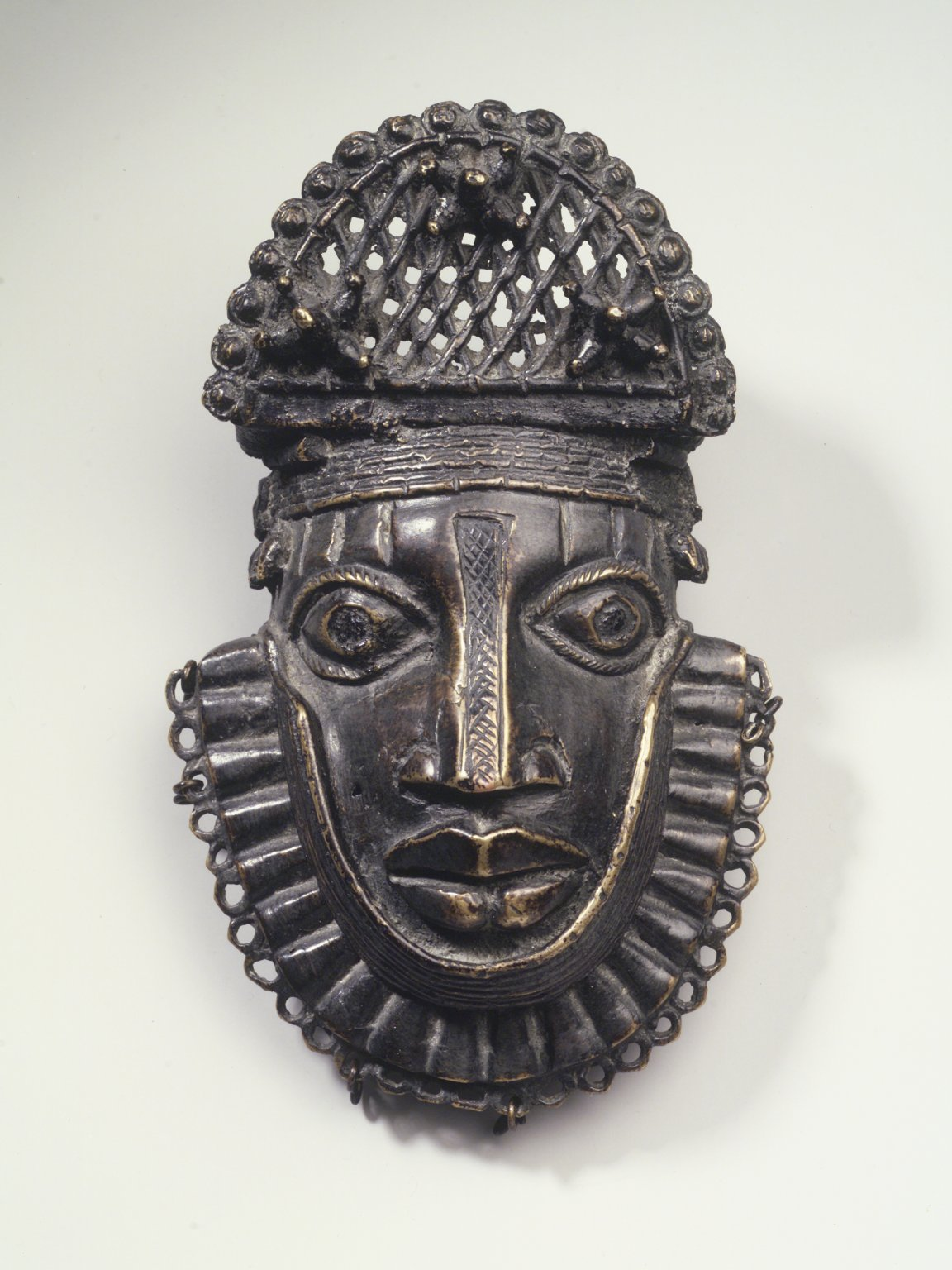
Hip Ornament with Human Face (Uhunmwun-ekue) from Benin, 18th-century, Brooklyn Museum, 1994.143, Gift of Beatrice Riese

Beatrice Riese (1917–2004) was an abstract painter from the Netherlands as well as a collector of African art.

== Personal life ==
Riese was born in The Netherlands and lived with her family in Germany. She studied art in Paris from 1936 to 1940, earning a Baccalaureate. There, she developed a lifelong appreciation for African art, which she first saw at the Musée de l'Homme after it opened in 1937. In 1940, in advance of the German invasion, she and her parents fled to Africa. They went to Casablanca and then boarded a freighter to the African Gold Coast (now the Republic of Ghana). They soon resettled in Richmond, Virginia.

After relocating to the United States in 1940, Riese studied with Clyfford Still at Virginia Commonwealth University (from 1943 to 1945) and with Will Barnet in New York (from 1955 to 1965). She moved to New York in 1949. She joined American Abstract Artists, where she served as president (from 1990) for more than a decade. She was a member of A.I.R. Gallery, the first all female artists cooperative gallery in the United States.

== Works ==
Riese had many solo exhibitions and her artwork is in the collections of more than forty museums, including the Brooklyn Museum, Krannert Art Museum, Pratt Institute, Museum of Modern Art, National Museum of Women in the Arts in Washington, Snite Museum of Art, Whitney Museum of American Art, and others.

For her artworks that employ a grid structure, Riece may have taken inspiration from the work of Indian Space painters in the 1940s and early 1950s, including Will Barnet. Stephen Westfall argues that although those works are not structured using a grid, they share the same "interlocking spatial reversals and movements and fluid hard-edged style."

== Art collecting ==
Riece collected African and Native American artwork. She acquired her first piece of African art in 1950 from Julius Carlebach, one of the earliest dealers of African art in New York. Her African art collection now belongs to the Brooklyn Museum. The museum organized an exhibition of thirty of her West and Central African masks and figural sculptures in 2000. She also gave artwork from her collection to the Virginia Museum of Fine Arts and the Snite Museum of Art at Notre Dame University.
