= G. Byron Peck =

American painter

G. Byron Peck is an American mural artist, and artistic director of City Arts DC. In 2008, Peck received First Prize in the (International) Spectrum Awards for Creative Use of Mosaic in a Commercial Project. In 2007, he received the Bank of America Local Hero Award; and in 2000, he was awarded the District of Columbia Mayor's Art Award for Excellence in an Artistic Discipline.

== Life ==
He graduated from Virginia Commonwealth University with a BFA in 1976 and received a Professional Fellowship for Painting from the Virginia Museum of Fine Arts in Richmond, Virginia in 1977 and 1979. He has provided his expertise via lectures at the Corcoran School of Art, the Smithsonian Institution, George Washington University, and George Mason University.

Mr. Peck has been commissioned by The Kennedy Center, the Marriott Corporation, the U.S. Nuclear Regulatory Commission; the U.S. State Department in collaboration with U.S. Embassies in various countries; the D.C. Commission on the Arts & Humanities (for multiple projects); Eagle Bank, Chinatown; Mount Vernon, Virginia (George Washington's estate home); the District of Columbia Parks & Recreation Department (in collaboration with Washington Parks & People, for the Ladybird Johnson Meadows/Marvin Gaye Park); D.C. Planning & Economic Development/Deputy Mayor's Neighborhood Investment Fund (for multiple projects); the D.C. Department of Transportation; the Corcoran Gallery of Art for a D.C. Department of Transportation project; United Planning Organization; the City of Ottawa, Illinois; the American Legacy Foundation; the Los Angeles Cultural Affairs Department and the Social and Public Art Resource Center (SPARK, with Judy Bacca); American Café; the City of Knoxville, Tennessee; and Montgomery County Art in Public Architecture (Bethesda, MD).

He worked with DCArtworks, until 1996.

== Works ==
- Duke Ellington Mural, 1997; 2007
- Scenes of Washington 1989; 2001
- Southwest Gateway Mosaics
- General W.H.L. Wallace
- B & O Railroad Station (Silver Spring, MD)
- Dupont Circle
- Palma, 2002.
