= Ronnie Sidney, II =

- Born: 1983 (age 42–43); Tappahannock, Virginia, United States
- Occupations: Graphic Novelist, Outpatient Therapist
- Writing career
- Genre: Graphic Novel
- Notable work: Nelson Beats the Odds Series
- Website: creative-medicine.com

Ronnie Sidney, II (born 1983), is author of the Nelson Beats The Odds graphic novel series and founder of Creative Medicine: Healing through Words, LLC, which facilitates therapeutic writing for offenders. He is also a public speaker.

== Biography ==
Ronnie Sidney, II, LCSW, was raised in Tappahannock, Virginia, and attended Essex County Public Schools, where he was diagnosed with a learning disability and spent several years in Special Education. He graduated from Essex High School in 2001 with a C grade average (1.8 GPA, to be exact). He attended J. Sargeant Reynolds Community College in Richmond, Virginia, and earned his Bachelor of Science degree in Human Services in 2006 from Old Dominion University. He went on to earn his Master of Social Work at Virginia Commonwealth University.

Ronnie Sidney is the founder of Creative Medicine: Healing through Words, LLC, which was created to facilitate therapeutic writing and dialogue groups for offenders, and later was transformed into a publishing company for the Nelson Beats The Odds series. Ronnie Sidney is an outpatient therapist, an author, and the developer of the Nelson Beats the Odds Comic Creator mobile app.

He also speaks, and attends book signings and school career events.

In a letter published March 8, 2023, Sidney criticized a newspaper for mentioning 2009 assault and battery charges against music star Chris Brown in an earlier article published February 8, 2023 about efforts to establish "Chris Brown Appreciation Day" in the town of Tappahannock, Virginia. In the article, "Chris Brown Appreciation Day Proposed," the newspaper, The Rappahannock Times, had included four sentences about the star's assault of and reconciliation with Rihanna in 2009.

Sidney opened the letter by apologizing to Brown and other individuals he suggested were wronged by the paper's coverage and by "comments that weaponized intimate partner violence to personally attack Chris Brown."

Sidney, a licensed clinical social worker, wants the town of Tappahannock to officially honor Brown, and has suggested a number of commemorations, including giving Brown an honorary high school diploma from Essex High School, the school Brown would have attended had he not dropped out in 2004 to relocate to New York City.

== Bibliography ==
- Nelson Beats The Odds (2015) ISBN 0-99653-241-2
- Tameka's New Dress (Nelson Beats The Odds) (Volume 2) (2016) ISBN 0-99653-247-1
- Nelson Beats The Odds: Compendium One (2016) ISBN 0-99653-249-8
- Rest in Peace RaShawn (Nelson Beats the Odds) (Volume 3) (2017) ISBN 9-78099-000-3
- Rest in Peace RaShawn Reloaded (Nelson Beats the Odds) (Volume 4) (2017) ISBN 9-78099-002-X
- African Americans Who Received Special Education Services and Succeeded Beyond Expectations: "Insecurities of Special Education: What It’s Like to Be Black, Male, and Learning Disabled" (2018)
