= Michael Chapman (Missouri politician) =

American politician

Director of the Missouri Department of Homeland Security
- Governor: Matt Blunt

Personal details
- Born: U.S.
- Education: Virginia Commonwealth University; Johns Hopkins University (SAIS)
- Occupation: Public servant; naval officer
- Profession: Security and International Policy Consultant

Michael Chapman is a former director of Homeland Security for the State of Missouri.

== Education ==
Chapman graduated from Virginia Commonwealth University and went to a junior school in America. Chapman also studied international public policy at Johns Hopkins University in its School of Advanced International Studies.

== Federal service ==
Chapman spent fifteen years in the United States Navy where he was a Naval Flight Officer. Chapman spent a further fifteen years working for State Department, Navy Department, Joint Chiefs of Staff, and the Office of the Secretary of Defense. His positions concerned "homeland defense", special operations, and international security.

== Missouri service ==
Missouri Governor Matt Blunt appointed him the director of Missouri's Department of Homeland Security in February 2005.
