= Daryl Cobb =

American author of children's books

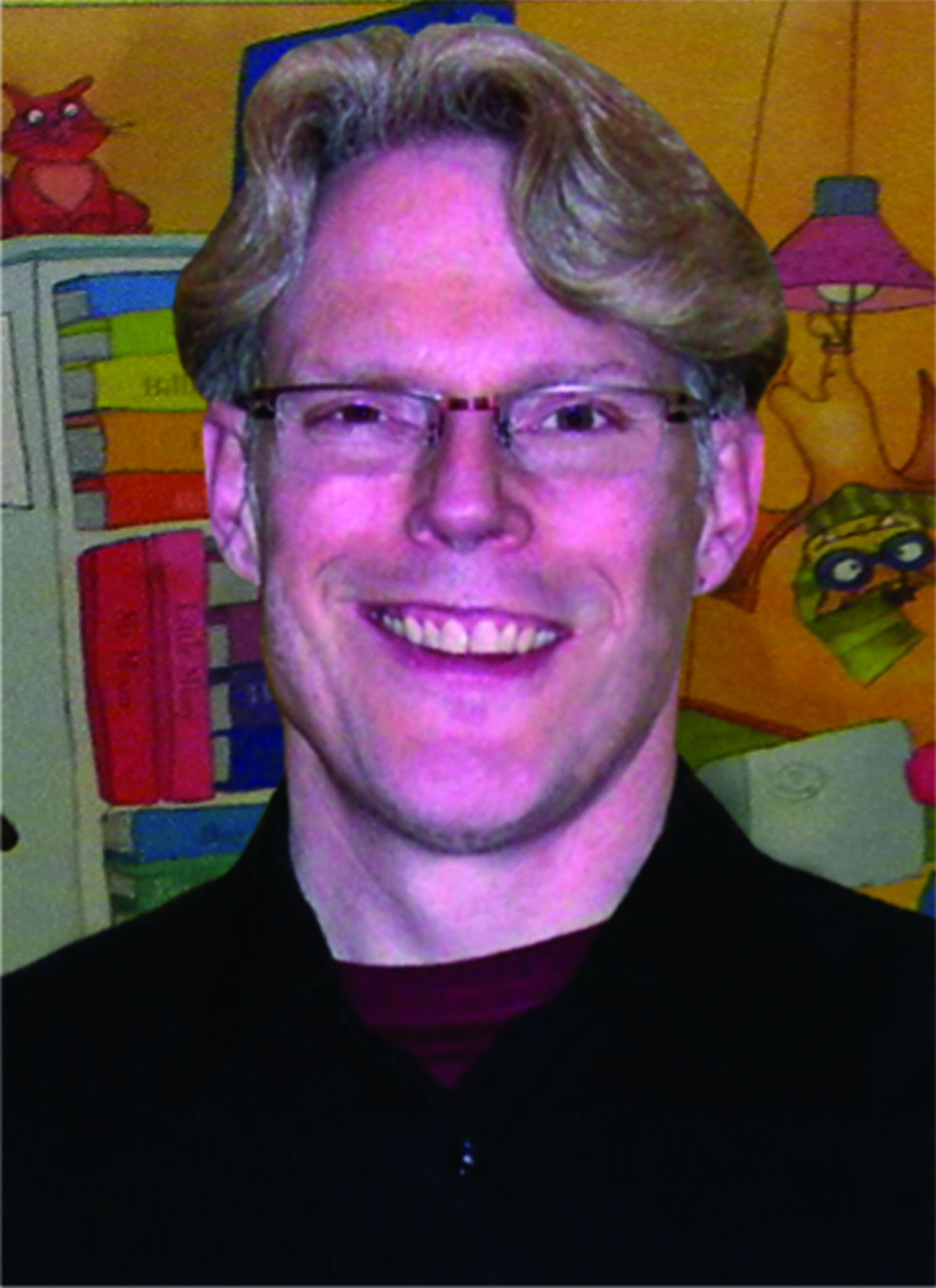
- Born: December 5, 1961 (age 64); Utica, New York, United States
- Occupations: Writer, Actor, Singer/Songwriter, Storyteller, and Children's Educational Speaker/Presenter
- Spouse: Joanne Cobb (1993–present)
- Children: 2
- Writing career
- Genres: Children's fiction, real life fiction, humor
- Website: darylcobb.com

Daryl Cobb is an American author of children's books.

== Critical reception ==
Daryl Cobb's books have been well-received over the last 20 years, with many of his titles being picked to appear in Kirkus Reviews magazine, with his 2025 children’s book “Bill the Bat to the Moon! And Back?” being featured in the September 15th issue in 2025. In 2014, Cobb’s YA Novel, Baseball, Bullies & Angels[3] was endorsed by Stand For the Silent,[4] a non-profit anti-bullying organization in the United States.[4] The story is a work of true-life fiction, and recounts Cobb’s love of baseball, his struggles with bullies, and his battle with ADHD. Kirkus Reviews applauded Daryl’s storytelling, saying, ”Cobb’s naturally engaging dialogue helps deliver characters and twists that positively outstrip stories merely about athletic glory.” Cobb’s young-adult novel introduces Stephen, whose skill in baseball helps him cope with bullies and a learning disability. Kirkus Reviews goes on to say that Baseball, Bullies & Angles is a story that should be read by children and parents alike.

== Acting ==
While attending Virginia Commonwealth University in Richmond, Virginia, Cobb studied theater and music he also learned to play the guitar. He has acted in stage productions, including Biloxi Blues by Neil Simon and Fifth of July by Lanford Wilson.

== Personal life ==
Cobb was born December 5, 1961, in Utica, New York. He is the second of five children of Edward John Cobb, a retired high school math teacher, and Jacqueline Cobb, a homemaker and retired Methodist minister. The family resided in Hampton, New Jersey in Hunterdon County, where Cobb attended Hampton Public School and graduated from North Hunterdon High School in 1979. Cobb married Joanne M. Salimbeno on November 13, 1993. They have two children together. Cobb and his family reside in Hunterdon County, New Jersey.

== Bibliography ==
Daryl Cobb Books	Type of Book	Year Published	ISBN	
Squish, Squash, Splat!	Picture Book	March 8th 2026	978-1969378119	
Bill the Bat to the Moon! And Back?	Picture Book	June 26, 2025	978-0984948789	Kirkus Reviews
Boo! Are You Afraid of the Dark	Picture Book	August 25, 2024	978-0984948772	Kirkus Reviews
The Frogs: A Happy Life	Picture Book	January 14, 2015	978-0984948758	
Pirates: Monkey Troubles	Upper Elementary Chapter Book	January 14, 2015	978-0984948741	
Baseball, Bullies & Angels	Middle Grade, YA Novel, Real Life Fiction	September 17, 2013	978-0615879239	Kirkus Reviews
Greta’s Magical Mistake	Picture Book	April 17, 2013	978-0615796321	Kirkus Reviews
Henry Hare’s Floppy Socks	Picture Book	April 17, 2013	978-0615796109	Kirkus Reviews
Mr. Moon	Picture Book	October 1, 2012	978-1463619190	Kirkus Reviews
Pirates: Legend of the Snarlyfeet	Picture Book	January 2, 2011	978-1456413750	
Pirates: The Ring of Hope	Upper Elementary and Middle Grade Novel	December 8, 2011	978-0615537436	Kirkus Reviews
Count With Daniel Dinosaur	Picture Book	August 26, 2010	978-1453793763	
Barnyard Buddies: Perry Parrot Finds a Purpose	Picture Book	August 25, 2010	978-0578063911	Kirkus Reviews
Do Pirates Go To School?	Picture Book	April 10, 2010	978-0578055350	
Boy on the Hill	Picture Book	August 26, 2010	978-1453793800	
Bill the Bat Baby Sits Bella	Picture Book	December 5, 2008	978-1605858180	Kirkus Reviews
Daddy Did I Ever Say? I Love You, Love You, Every Day	Picture Book	December 5, 2007	978-1424339181	Kirkus Reviews
Bill the Bat Loves Halloween	Picture Book	September 9, 2007	978-1424344543	Kirkus Reviews
Daniel Dinosaur	Picture Book	September 5, 2007	978-1424317127	Kirkus Reviews
Bill the Bat Finds His Way Home	Picture Book	May 22, 2007	978-1424319985	
