= Anthony Anderson (baritone) =

American operatic baritone singer (born c. 1998)

Anthony D. Anderson (born c. 1998 in Washington, D.C.) is an American operatic baritone singer.

== Early life ==
Anderson is the youngest of seven children; his father was killed in a drive-by shooting when he was 3 years old. Since then he lived with his mother, Charlene Anderson, and his other siblings. He attended the DC Prep charter school. Here he was also introduced to the City Kids Wilderness Project. He graduated from Duke Ellington School of the Arts where he found his desire of singing and devoted himself towards opera. Over the years he learned skills in areas such as language in Italian and found he had a natural affinity towards German. He was employed at Chipotle but couldn't hold on to the position. He attended Virginia Commonwealth University until June 2017, when he was forced to drop out because he could not afford $9,000 that student loans did not cover, thus he was not able to re-enroll unless the debt was paid. Anderson has been accepted into the Juilliard School, Johns Hopkins University's Peabody Institute, and Oberlin Conservatory of Music with full scholarships.

== Career ==
He has been featured on the Today show. Anderson has performed at the Supreme Court of the United States for the Horatio Alger Association. He performed professionally at the Fort Worth Opera. Anderson currently studies at the Oberlin Conservatory to further his education and hone his skills as a musician under the direction of Timothy LeFebvre. He is scheduled to graduate in the spring of 2022.
