= John R. Weisz =

American Psychologist and Researcher

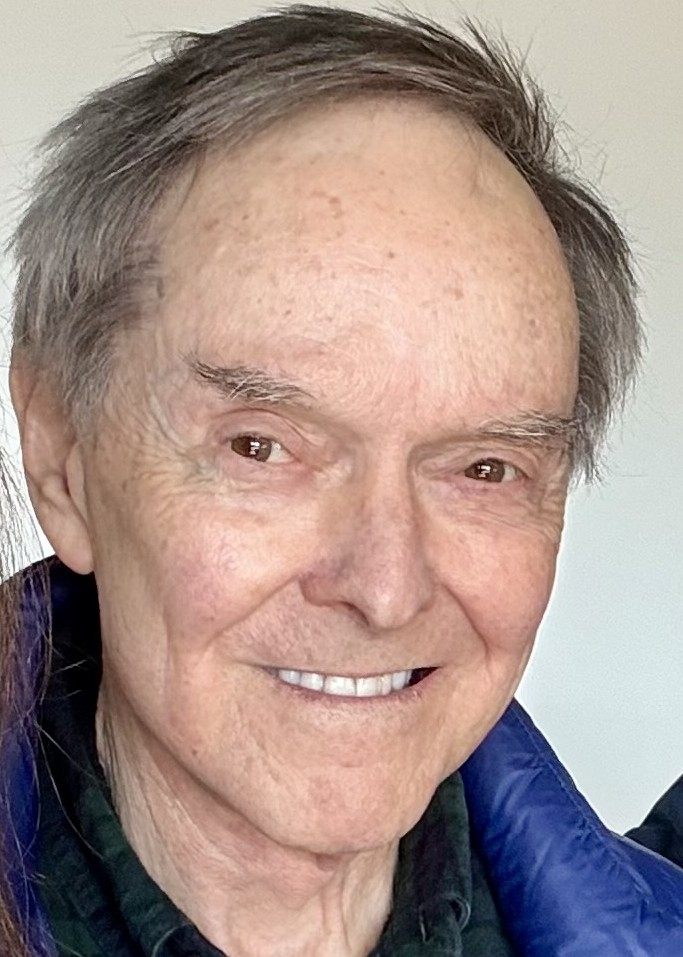
- Occupations: Psychologist, academic researcher, professor

Academic background
- Education: Mississippi College, BA (1967) [U.S.Peace Corps Volunteer in Kenya, 1968-1971] Yale University, MS (1973) and Ph.D. (1975)

Academic work
- Institutions: Harvard University; Harvard Medical School; Judge Baker Children’s Center; University of California at Los Angeles; University of North Carolina at Chapel Hill; Cornell University
- Main interests: Child & Adolescent Psychology, Psychotherapy Research, Meta-Analysis, Implementation Science
- Website: http://weiszlab.fas.harvard.edu

John R. Weisz (born 1945) is Henry Ford II Research Professor of the Social Sciences in the Psychology Department of Harvard University, and Professor in Harvard Medical School. His randomized controlled effectiveness trials and meta-analyses of youth psychotherapies have bridged a gap between university labs and clinical practice. By developing and testing treatments with clinically referred youths, treated by practitioners, in practice settings, he has focused attention on the need to know how well research-derived interventions fare in real-world clinical care. His work has shown that the effects of treatments tested in laboratory contexts drop markedly when the treatments are tested in clinical care settings (an effect he labels “the implementation cliff”), but that research-derived, evidence-based youth psychotherapies significantly outperform usual clinical care.

== Early life and education ==
Weisz was born in Newton, Mississippi, and grew up in Jackson, Mississippi and Clinton, Mississippi. He earned his bachelor’s degree from Mississippi College, in Clinton. He was a U.S. Peace Corps volunteer in Kenya for three years, then earned his M.A. and Ph.D. from Yale University. Weisz completed graduate school in four years, including a one-year full-time clinical internship at Connecticut Valley Hospital from 1974-1975. He married Virginia (Jenny) Graves in 1967. She earned a J.D. at Cornell University and held multiple leadership positions developing programs for child protection and support, in a career that, like that of her husband, focused specifically on the well-being of children and adolescents.

== Career ==
In 1975, he took up his first academic position, as Assistant Professor at Cornell University in the Department of Human Development and Family Studies. He was there for three years, then moved to the Psychology Department of the University of North Carolina at Chapel Hill, where he was a faculty member from 1978 through 1990, initially as Assistant Professor, then Associate Professor, and then as Professor. From 1990 through 2004, he served as Professor in the Department of Psychology at UCLA, where he also held a joint appointment as Professor in the Psychiatry Department of the UCLA Medical School. In 2004, he moved to Boston, to serve as President and Chief Executive Officer of the Judge Baker Children’s Center and Professor in Harvard Medical School. In 2007, he was also appointed Professor in the Department of Psychology at Harvard, while retaining his appointment as President and CEO of the Judge Baker Children’s Center. In 2012, he retired from Judge Baker to focus fully on research and teaching in the Harvard Psychology Department. During his career, Weisz served as President of the Society of Clinical Child and Adolescent Psychology (2000-2001), President of the International Society for Research in Child and Adolescent Psychopathology (2001-2003), Director of the Research Network on Youth Mental Health (2001-2012), and Elected Member of the Board on Children, Youth, and Families of the National Academy of Sciences/Institute of Medicine (2007-2010). He has mentored more than 80 graduate students and postdoctoral fellows, more than 40 of whom have become faculty members at research universities.

== Research interests ==
Weisz’s focus throughout his career has been youth mental health, and specifically psychotherapy for children and adolescents. His team’s meta-analyses of youth psychotherapy randomized controlled trials (RCTs) have identified both strengths and limitations of interventions for young people and highlighted questions and directions for future research.

Weisz developed the deployment-focused model, which calls for designing treatments for real world implementation and testing them in randomized controlled effectiveness trials (RCETs)—that is, trials conducted in clinical care settings with clinically referred youths, with the tested interventions delivered by the practitioners in those settings, and with usual clinical care in those settings as the control condition, in order to test whether the tested treatment outperforms the status quo. Two RCETs tested Philip Kendall’s Coping Cat program for youth anxiety and Weisz’s Primary and Secondary Control Enhancement Training (PASCET) program for youth depression, and revealed that the target treatment did not outperform usual care. Most of the young people in these studies met diagnostic criteria for multiple disorders, not just the anxiety or depression for which the manuals had been designed; this discovery led to the next phase of Weisz's research, focused on treatment strategies for addressing youth comorbidity.

Weisz and his colleague Bruce Chorpita developed a treatment designed in part to address youth comorbidity: Modular Approach to Therapy for Children with Anxiety, Depression, Trauma, or Conduct Problems (MATCH-ADTC), is a menu of 33 treatment procedures for the four broad diagnostic categories that account for most youth mental health referrals. Therapists select from the menu a combination of modules (brief descriptions of treatment procedures) to fit the symptoms and needs of each individual youth. An initial RCET found that MATCH produced better clinical outcomes than either usual care or standard manuals for specific diagnostic categories, and a long term follow-up assessment found sustained superiority of MATCH over usual care. A second RCET found further evidence that MATCH outperformed usual care, but subsequent RCETs have not found significant differences between MATCH and usual care in outpatient settings.

Weisz and his colleague Sarah Kate Bearman developed a different kind of treatment, organized around what their evidence review suggested were five empirically supported principles of change, embodied within the name of their FIRST manual: Feeling Calm, Increasing Motivation, Repairing Thoughts, Solving Problems, and Trying the (positive) Opposite (of troublesome behavior). Using FIRST, therapists initially identify the principle of change that is most needed for each youth they treat, and then use treatment procedures described in the manual for activating that principle. Three open benchmarking trials have shown that clinically referred youths treated with FIRST by outpatient clinicians show substantial symptom reduction, similar to that seen in the most successful trials of MATCH. A multisite RCET of FIRST, funded by NIMH, is now underway.

Weisz and his team in the Harvard Lab for Youth Mental Health have also developed and tested single-session digital mental health interventions (DMHIs). The lab’s RCTs have shown significant mental health benefit for DMHIs that teach growth mindset (the belief that one can improve and overcome setbacks through effort and perseverance), problem-solving skills, and a combination of growth mindset, gratitude, and values affirmation. They have also found that DMHIs can improve mental health symptoms with youths in Kenya and with Ukrainian refugee youths in Poland.

Weisz and his students and colleagues developed the Top Problems Assessment (TPA), an idiographic measure through which youths and their caregivers identify the youth problems for which they seek help in therapy. Repeated severity ratings of these top problems by both participants throughout therapy provide a sensitive index of whether the problems that matter most to the consumers of therapy are improving. Weisz and his students also developed the Behavior and Feelings Survey —six items assessing internalizing (anxiety and depression) symptoms and six assessing externalizing (conduct) symptoms.

In sum, Weisz, with his students and colleagues, has provided ongoing review of the state of youth intervention science through meta-analyses, growth in the armamentarium of youth psychotherapies and evidence on their effects through randomized trials, and expansion of the measurement needed to properly evaluate treatment benefit.

== Honors and awards ==
John R. Weisz Awards and Honors
| Award | Date |
|---|---|
| Association for Psychological Science Lifetime Career Mentor Award | 2026 |
| Aitana Lifetime Career Award, International Congress of Clinical and Health Psychology in Children and Adolescents | 2024 |
| Sarah Gund Prize for Research and Mentorship in Child Mental Health, Scientific Research Council, Child Mind Institute | 2019 |
| Klaus-Grawe Award for the Advancement of Innovative Research in Clinical Psychology and Psychotherapy, Klaus-Grawe Foundation for the Advancement of Psychotherapy Research | 2015 |
| James McKeen Cattell Lifetime Achievement Award, Association for Psychological Science | 2013 |

== Representative publications ==
- Weisz, J.R., Chorpita, B.F., Palinkas, L.A., Schoenwald, S.K., Miranda, J., Bearman, S.K., Daleiden, E.L., Ugueto, A.M., Ho, A., Martin, J., Gray, J., Alleyne, A., Langer, D.A., Southam-Gerow, M.A., Gibbons, R.D., and the Research Network on Youth Mental HealthN. (2012). Testing standard and modular designs for psychotherapy with youth depression, anxiety, and conduct problems: A randomized effectiveness trial. Archives of General Psychiatry, 69 (3), 274-282. https://doi.org/10.1001/archgenpsychiatry.2011.147
- Schleider, J.L. & Weisz, J.R. (2018). A single-session growth mindset intervention for adolescent anxiety and depression: Nine-month outcomes of a randomized trial. Journal of Child Psychology and Psychiatry, 59(2), 160-170. https://doi.10.1111/jcpp.12811
- Weisz, J.R., & Bearman, S.K. (2020). Principle-Guided Psychotherapy for Children and Adolescents: The FIRST Treatment Program for Behavioral and Emotional Problems. New York: Guilford Press.
- Weisz, J.R., Steinberg, J.S., Sun, J., Mair, P., Fitzpatrick. O.M., Karapata, N., Yusyn, M., Sood, G., Danese, A., Adams, K.M., & Ougrin, D. (2025). Effects of a brief digital problem-solving intervention on depression and anxiety symptoms in Ukrainian children and adolescents displaced by war: A randomised controlled trial. The Lancet Primary Care, 1(1), 1-11. https://doi.org/10.1016/j.lanprc.2025.100001
- Weisz, J.R., Chorpita, B.F., Frye, A., Ng, M.Y., Lau, N., Bearman, S.K., Ugueto, A.M., Langer, D.A., Hoagwood, K., and the Research Network on Youth Mental HealthN (2011). Youth top problems: Using idiographic, consumer-guided assessment to identify treatment needs and track change during psychotherapy. Journal of Consulting and Clinical Psychology, 79 (3), 369-380. https://dx.doi:10.1037/a0023307
- Weisz, J.R., Vaughn-Coaxum, R.A., Evans, S.C., Thomassin, K., Hersh, J., Ng, M.Y., Lau, N., Lee, E.H., Raftery-Helmer, J.N., & Mair, P. (2020). Efficient monitoring of treatment response during youth psychotherapy: The Behavior and Feelings Survey. Journal of Clinical Child and Adolescent Psychology, 49(6), 737-751. https://doi:https://doi.org/10.1080/15374416.2018.1547973
- Weisz, J.R., Kuppens, S., Eckshtain, D., Ugueto, A.M., Hawley, K.M., & Jensen-Doss, A. (2013). Performance of evidence-based youth psychotherapies compared with usual clinical care: A multilevel meta-analysis. JAMA Psychiatry, 70(7), 750-761. https://doi.org/10.1001/jamapsychiatry.2013.1176
- Weisz, J.R., Kuppens, S., Ng, M.Y., Eckshtain, D., Ugueto, A.M., Vaughn-Coaxum, R., Jensen-Doss, A., Hawley, K.M., Krumholz, L.S., Chu, B.C., Weersing, V.R., & Fordwood, S.R. (2017). What five decades of research tells us about the effects of youth psychological therapy: A multilevel meta-analysis and implications for science and practice. American Psychologist, 72, 79-117. https://dx.doi.org/10.1037/a0040360
- Weisz, J.R., Kuppens, S., Ng, M.Y., Vaughn-Coaxum, R.A., Ugueto, A.M., Eckshtain, D., & Corteselli, K.A. (2019). Are psychotherapies for young people growing stronger? Tracking trends over time for youth anxiety, depression, ADHD, and conduct problems. Perspectives on Psychological Science, 14 (2), 216-237. https://doi.org/10.1177/1745691618805436
- Venturo-Conerly, K.E., Eisenman, D., Wasil, A.R., Singla, D.R., & Weisz, J.R. (2023). Meta-analysis: The effectiveness of youth psychotherapy interventions in low- and middle-income countries. Journal of the American Academy of Child and Adolescent Psychiatry, 62 (8). 859-873. https://doi.org/10.1016/j.jaac.2022.12.005
- Weisz, J.R., Venturo-Conerly, K.E., Fitzpatrick, O.M., Frederick J.A., & Ng, M.Y. (2023). What four decades of meta-analysis have taught us about youth psychotherapy and the science of research synthesis. Annual Review of Clinical Psychology, 19, 79-105. https://doi.org/10.1146/annurev-clinpsy-080921-082920
- Schleider, J.L., & Weisz, J.R. (2017). Little treatments, promising effects: Meta-analysis of single-session interventions for youth psychiatric problems. Journal of the American Academy of Child and Adolescent Psychiatry, 56, 107-115. https://dx.doi.org/10.1016/j.jaac.2016.11.007
