= Great Basin Landscape Conservation Cooperative =

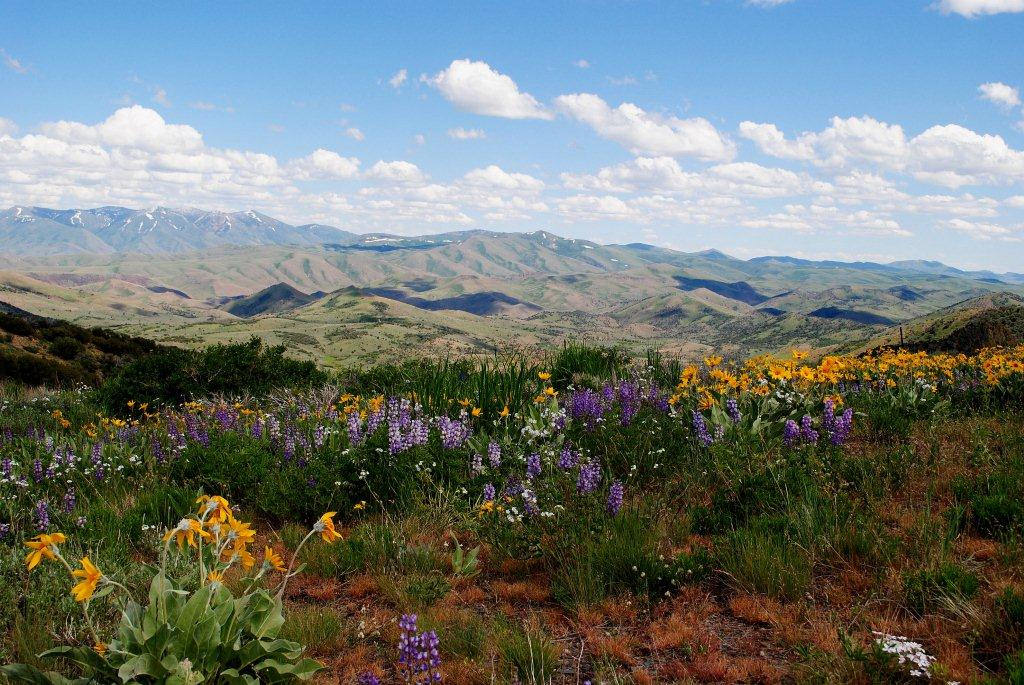
Sunflower Flats wildflowers, BLM Elko District, Great Basin LCC

The Great Basin Landscape Conservation Cooperative is a partnership of the United States government with other agencies to address the challenges of climate change in the Great Basin.

Among its projects are the

- Intermountain West Joint Venture
- Great Basin Restoration Initiative
- Desert Fish Habitat Partnership

among its partners are the

- Nature Conservancy
- Cooperative Sagebrush Initiative
- Great Basin Environmental Program

There are 21 other similar partnerships in other regions.

== See also ==
- Conservation development
- Blue Ridge Berryessa Natural Area
- Georgia Land Conservation Program
- Saline Wetlands Conservation Partnership
- Landscape Conservation Cooperatives
