= FRIENDS program =

Program that aims to increase social and emotional skills

The FRIENDS Programs are a series of resilience-building programs developed by Professor Paula Barrett. The programs aim to increase social and emotional skills, promote resilience, and prevent anxiety and depression across the lifespan. As a prevention protocol, FRIENDS has been described as "one of the most robustly-supported programmes for internalising disorders," with "a number of large-scale type 1 randomised control trials worldwide" demonstrating its effectiveness. The FRIENDS programs are acknowledged by the World Health Organization as effective, evidence-based prevention programs.

The FRIENDS programs incorporate physiological, cognitive, and behavioural strategies to assist children, adolescents, and adults in coping with stress and worry. Studies have demonstrated the effectiveness of FRIENDS in addressing mental health issues such as OCD, anxiety, depression, autism, and stress in children, adolescents, adults, and the elderly. Additionally, studies have indicated that protective factors such as self-esteem, self-concept, coping skills, hope, and social support are enhanced through the program. The FRIENDS protocol was designed to be delivered in both clinical and educational settings by teachers, psychologists, and allied health professionals. The FRIENDS Programs continue to be researched and developed by their author, Professor Paula Barrett, in Queensland, Australia, and by other researchers worldwide, including Professor Paul Stallard, Professor Elisabeth Utens, and Professor Bente Storm Haugland.

== History ==
The FRIENDS Programs were developed by Professor Paula Barrett. Based on cognitive behavioural techniques, the protocol was originally developed for the early intervention and prevention of anxiety. Unlike other anxiety protocols at the time, such as Phillip C. Kendall's Coping Cat, FRIENDS utilises a group format and can be applied as a prevention, early intervention, or treatment approach.

In 1999, further research led to the production of a third edition of FRIENDS for Children, which incorporated feedback to make the program more teacher-friendly. Continued research and development from 2000 onward led to iterative improvements in the FRIENDS Programs.

In response to the devastating Queensland Floods of 2010/2011, Professor Paula Barrett developed the Adult Resilience for Life Program. This program was designed to help adults cope with loss and extreme stress following natural disasters. The Adult Resilience Program was also implemented for victims of the 2011 Christchurch earthquake to help them cope with the loss of property and loved ones.

The Adult Resilience for Life Program was further developed into the Adult Resilience Strong Not Tough Program in 2012. This program is conducted in a two-day format and teaches coping strategies and relaxation techniques to adults and the elderly.

== Format ==
The FRIENDS protocol has been adapted into four developmentally sensitive programs:

- Fun FRIENDS (4 – 7 years)
- FRIENDS for life (8 – 11 years)
- My FRIENDS Youth (12 – 15 years)
- Adult Resilience for Life (16 years and over)

The programs are typically delivered over 10 sessions, with two booster sessions, each typically 60–75 minutes. Delivery is flexible across different settings, provided the sequence, structure, and topics are maintained. Two information sessions, approximately 90–120 minutes in duration, are conducted with caregivers and educators to provide strategies for enhancing resilience at home, reinforcing program strategies, and behaviour management techniques.

== Specific Goals ==
- Increasing participant's ability to recognise and regulate one's own emotions, thoughts and behaviours
- Building participant's skills in taking the perspective of and empathising with others
- Improving competencies of establishing and maintaining healthy and rewarding relationships
- Providing strategies for making constructive and respectful choices about personal behaviour and social interactions
- Enhancing participant's resilience to not only overcome adversity but also to take advantage of positive future challenges
- Developing skills to prevent and treat mental health concerns

== Content ==
The FRIENDS programs draw from interventions based on cognitive behavioural, acceptance and commitment, and positive psychology approaches. Skills covered in the younger programs are represented by the acronym FRIENDS, while the adult program utilises the acronym LIFE. All FRIENDS programs overlap in content; however, they differ in the method of skill delivery, with each program using developmentally appropriate activities. Specifically, while younger programs such as Fun FRIENDS and FRIENDS for Life encourage play-based techniques including puppets, storybooks, and colouring activities, the My FRIENDS Youth and Adult Resilience programs utilize role plays, group discussions, and written activities.

The general content includes:

- F= Feelings: This stage of the program focuses on building participants' skills in recognising and responding to their own feelings as well as the feelings of others. Throughout this stage, there is an emphasis on accepting feelings and choosing positive coping behaviours.
- R= Remember to Relax, Have Quiet time: The second stage of the program involves learning about physiological signs of emotions. By recognising these body clues, participants are better able to manage their feelings when they are of a smaller intensity and easier to regulate. This stage also trains participants in strategies to relax including diaphragmatic breathing, progressive muscle relaxation, massage and relaxation imagery. Adolescent and adult programs also utilise mindfulness strategies in this stage.
- I= I can try my best (Inner Helpful Thoughts): In the third stage, participants are introduced to attention training and the cognitive model. Attention and awareness have recently been identified as key factors in the maintenance of gains from evidence-based programs. Attention training encourages participants to practice awareness in the present moment and focusing on positive things in our environment. Both anxious and depressive symptomology typically involves negative evaluations about oneself, others and the world. Cognitive restructuring encourages participants to identify unhelpful thinking styles and challenge these thoughts to have more helpful thoughts, more pleasant feelings and more proactive behaviour.
- E= Explore solutions and Coping Step Plans: The fourth stage of the program differs heavily between younger and older stages of the program. Overall this stage focuses on learning coping skills and plans to overcome challenging situations including Coping Step Plans, Problem Solving Plans, Friendship Skills, Building Confidence, Conflict Resolution, Role Models, and Support Teams. Overcoming challenging situations can be a daunting task, Problem Solving Plans and Coping Step Plans help participants choose a course of action through brainstorming solutions, evaluating the potential consequences of their actions, breaking down goals into smaller steps, and reviewing the outcomes of their choices. Coping Step Plans are also utilised for exposure training, to help participants break the cycle of anxiety and avoidance to overcome fears, as well as time management, which is especially useful for adolescents. Friendship skills differ across developmental levels of the program ranging from sharing, helping and listening in younger age groups to navigating cyber friendships in older groups. Role Models and Support Teams are discussed as those who may support, guide or inspire participants during challenging situations. Conflict Resolution teaches skills in differentiating conflict styles (passive, assertive, aggressive) and how to best achieve assertive outcomes.
- N = Now reward yourself: This stage involves teaching participants the importance of self-rewarding. Activities highlight the importance of rewarding ourselves for our efforts rather than the outcomes. Interpersonal rewards are encouraged such as time and activities with family and/or friends as opposed to gifts, food, electronics or monetary rewards.
- D= Do it every day: Skills are most effective when practised every day. This letter of FRIENDS is to encourage participants to continue using the skills after the program is completed.
- S= Smile! Stay calm, and talk to support teams: The final stage of the program is the relapse prevention phase. Participants develop a more applied knowledge of the program by using skills in conjunction with each other. Identification of future challenges and planning strategies for overcoming these is a key learning outcome. Older programs also incorporate teaching participants about giving back to their community and the effects of healthy/unhealthy living (e.g. exercise, diet, substances, sleep) on brain development and mental health.

== Use in prevention ==
Studies on the effectiveness of FRIENDS in preventing anxiety in 9- to 10-year-old children have yielded mixed results. School-based prevention programs have been effective in reducing anxiety symptoms in around 78% of studies. Some studies report that effects were maintained or obtained at 6-month and 3 year follow-ups with some not showing any effects at all. This highlights variability in long-term effects of the program.

== Limitations ==
While the FRIENDS program has shown to be effective in reducing anxiety symptoms, the outcomes are not uniform. Effectiveness varies based on characteristics such as age, socioeconomic status, type of prevention, provider and implementation factors such as booster sessions and parent involvement.

Additionally, most of the evidence is concentrated in Australia, potentially raising concerns about generalizability to other countries.

== Translations and International Use ==
The FRIENDS program is currently used in the following countries: Australia, New Zealand, Hong Kong, Japan, Canada, Mexico, Peru, Brazil, Portugal, the United Kingdom, the Republic of Ireland, Finland, Norway, the Netherlands, and Singapore.

Region	Countries
Oceania	Australia, New Zealand
Asia	Hong Kong, Japan, Singapore
North America	Canada, Mexico
South America	Peru, Brazil
Europe	Portugal, United Kingdom, Republic of Ireland, Finland, Norway, Netherlands

Although originally written in English, the FRIENDS program has since been translated into Russian, Arabic, Finnish, Portuguese, Dutch, Japanese, and Spanish.

== Author ==
The FRIENDS program was authored by Professor Paula Barrett, who continues to develop and administer the FRIENDS Programs from her private practice, Pathways Health and Research Centre, in Brisbane, Australia, and worldwide. Professor Paula Barrett also continues to oversee the training of FRIENDS facilitators and licensees worldwide.
