= WCIP =

WCIP may refer to:

- The Water Conservation Implementation Plan, a component of the Conserve Georgia program
- We Come in Pieces, the 2011 live DVD by the alternative rock band Placebo
- Wisconsin Council for Immunization Practices, part of the Wisconsin Department of Health Services
- World Council of Indigenous Peoples, a non-governmental organization in operation from 1974 to 1996
- WCIP (FM), a radio station (93.7 FM) licensed to serve Clyde, New York, United States
