= Kimberly New =

American politician

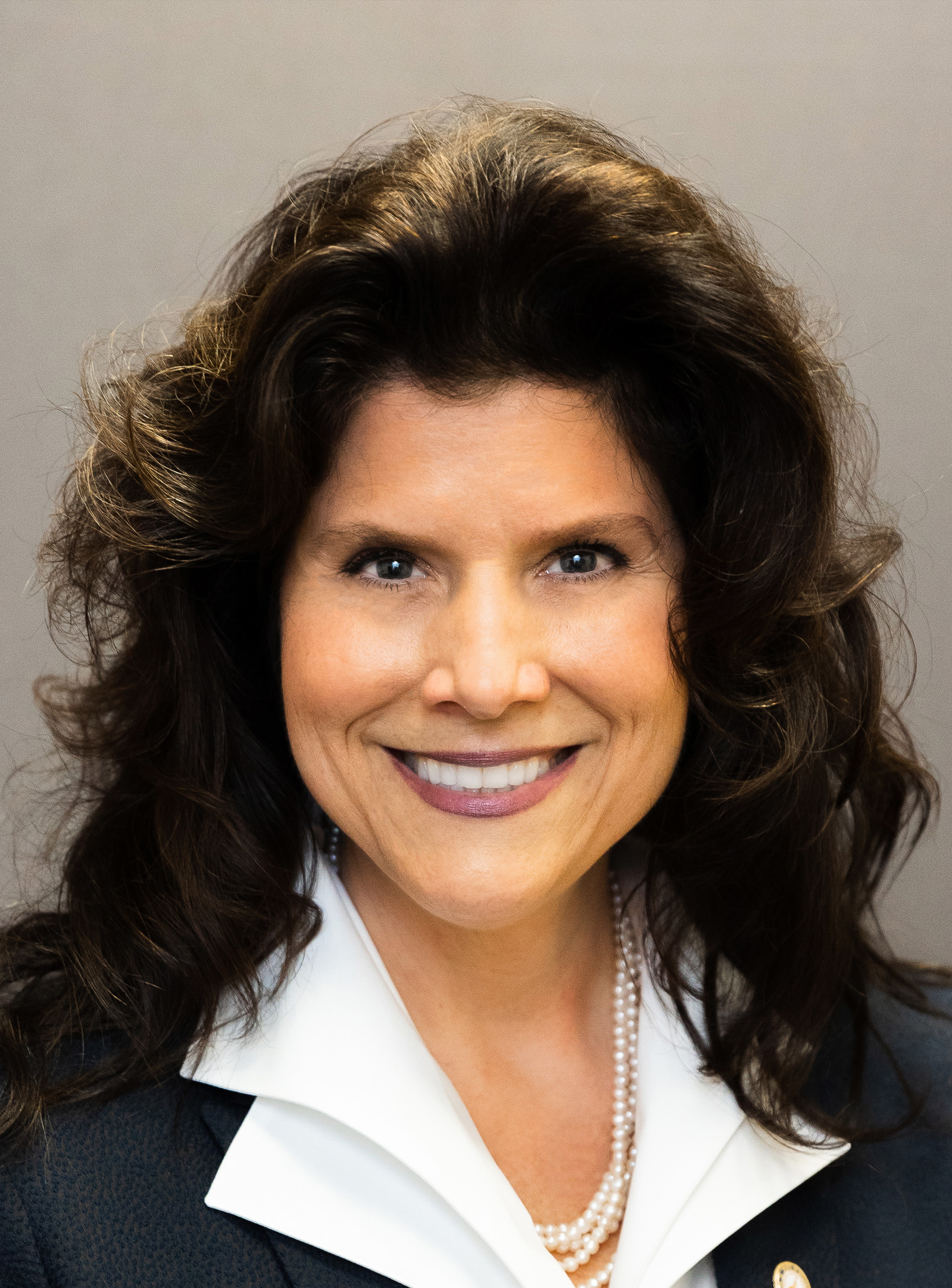

Member of the Georgia House of Representatives
- Incumbent
- Assumed office January 9, 2023
- Preceded by: Micah Gravley (redistricting)
- Constituency: 64th (2023-2025); 40th (2025-present)

Personal details
- Party: Republican

Kimberly Rainwater New is an American politician from the Georgia Republican Party who serves as a member of the Georgia House of Representatives representing District 40.
