= Hunter Hill (politician) =

American politician (born 1977)

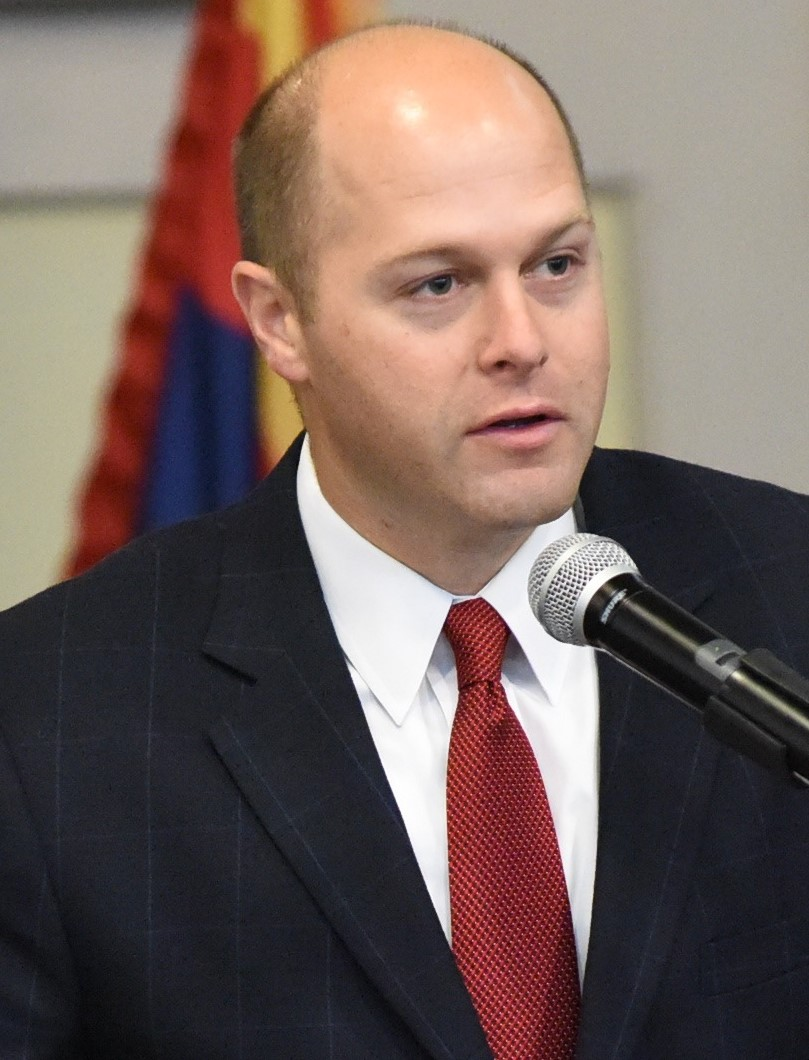

Member of the Georgia Senate from the 6th district
- In office January 14, 2013 – August 30, 2017
- Preceded by: Doug Stoner
- Succeeded by: Jen Jordan

Personal details
- Born: June 23, 1977 (age 48) Atlanta, Georgia, U.S.
- Party: Republican
- Education: United States Military Academy (BS)

Military service
- Allegiance: United States
- Branch/service: United States Army

Hunter Hill (born June 23, 1977) is an American Republican Party politician. He represented District 6 of the Georgia State Senate, located in Smyrna, from when he was first sworn into office on January 14, 2013, until he resigned on August 30, 2017 to run for governor. On April 24, 2017, Hill announced his candidacy for governor of Georgia in 2018. He lost the Republican gubernatorial primary on May 22, 2018, coming in third behind Casey Cagle and Brian Kemp.

== Biography ==
Hill received a B.S. degree from the United States Military Academy at West Point. After graduating from West Point, Hunter became a Lieutenant in the United States Army. He went on to graduate from the Airborne, the Air Assault, and the U.S. Army Ranger Schools. In June 2001, Hunter took command of a rifle platoon with the 101st Airborne Division, which he led into Afghanistan in 2002. Hill went on to serve two additional tours in Iraq and Afghanistan. Hill is the president of Tommy Newberry Coaching, a coaching company for entrepreneurs and business executives. He is married and has two children.

Hill was formerly the Vice Chair of the Georgia Senate's Majority Caucus, the chair of the Senate Veterans, Military and Homeland Security Committee, and the vice chairman of the Senate Finance Committee.

=== Political career ===
Hill first ran to represent the 6th District unsuccessfully in 2008, and ran again in 2012, this time successfully. In 2012, Hill received about 52% of the vote to incumbent Doug Stoner's 48%. In 2014, he was elected vice chairman of the Georgia State Senate's Majority Caucus by his colleagues. In December 2016, he was re-elected to the State Senate, defeating Democrat Jaha Howard by about 3%.

On April 24, 2017, Hill announced his candidacy for Governor of Georgia in the 2018 election. In April 2018, CNN reported that Hill's campaign website for Governor included parts that appeared to be directly from the website of Missouri Governor Eric Greitens. Campaign promises on the websites, the look of the websites and social media accounts for the campaigns looked very similar. The Hill campaign rejected that they mimicked the Greitens campaign, saying that the similarities were coincidental. On May 22, 2018, in the Republican gubernatorial primary, Hill finished third, with 18.3% of the overall primary vote (he received a total of 111,452 votes). Therefore, he did not advance to the July 24 runoff, which took place between the top two finishers, Casey Cagle and Brian Kemp.

Hill serves as the Executive Director of the Georgia Environmental Finance Authority.

== Legislation ==
In March 2015, Hill voted in support of a bill that created the Opportunity School District, a system intended to help struggling schools. In October 2016, Hill said that no schools in his district were in danger of falling into the Opportunity School District, adding that it "...provides an opportunity for schools that have been failing for three consecutive years to have different leadership, to change the trajectory of those schools that have proven to continue to fail." In May 2015, Georgia Governor Nathan Deal signed SB63, a bill sponsored by Hill. The bill allows craft breweries in the state to charge people for a tour and to give a limited amount of beer to their customers as a free souvenir. In February 2016, Hill introduced Senate Bill 395, which would create a private school subsidy program for the non-disabled children of military personnel in Georgia. Soon afterward, the bill became locked in a committee.

== Controversy ==
Both gun rights groups and Hill's political opposition have pointed out inconsistencies in his voting record regarding Second Amendment issues. On March 31, 2018, at a gubernatorial debate in Flowery Branch, candidate Michael Williams attacked Hill for "remarks he made about potentially raising the minimum age to purchase any firearm from 18 to 21". Hill maintains that he misspoke, and instead meant that he wants parity for the minimum age of purchasing any type of gun. Hill has received multiple C ratings from the NRA Political Victory Fund throughout his career as a state senator. In response to the uproar surrounding his comments, Hill filmed a campaign ad set in a shooting range and has worked to earn the trust of gun owners. Because of these efforts, Hill has an A rating from the NRA at the moment. Fellow gubernatorial candidate Clay Tippins further questioned Hill's voting record by releasing an attack ad that portrays Hill as Benedict Arnold, the Revolutionary War turncoat. Georgia Carry, a Second Amendment advocacy group, states that they strongly oppose Hill's bid for governor on grounds that "his credentials on the Second Amendment certainly do not support his advertised position," specifically referring to HB875.
