= Nevada Basin =

Natural depression in Nevada, USA

The Nevada Basin is the Great Basin area surrounded by river basins and, to the east, the Great Salt Lake basin (Pleistocene Lake Bonneville basin). The bounding river basins include those of the following (clockwise from south-southeast): Sevier River, Muddy River (Meadow Valley Wash, White River), Las Vegas Wash, Colorado River, Mojave River, Amargosa River, Owens River, Lake Lahontan basin (Walker River, Carson River, Humboldt River, Reese River), and Snake River. The 1850 diagonal California state lines with the Utah Territory & New Mexico Territory are along the general direction of the Nevada Basin's southwest drainage divide (rim), while the north-to-south rim on the east is through the area of the three meridians (1861, 1862, & current 1864) used for the Nevada-Utah state line.
