= Conserve Georgia =

US public education program

Conserve Georgia was launched on April 24, 2008, as a public education program tasked with fostering a culture of conservation among government agencies, businesses, academic institutions, non-profit organizations and residents in Georgia.

Nine state agencies participate in the Conserve Georgia program, including the Department of Natural Resources, Georgia Environmental Facilities Authority, Department of Community Affairs, University System of Georgia, Georgia Forestry Commission, Georgia Soil and Water Conservation Commission, Department of Education, Department of Transportation and Department of Agriculture.

Conservation programs that are operated by the Conserve Georgia partner agencies include initiatives for water and air quality, energy efficiency, recycling, wildlife conservation and litter prevention. These resources are available to everyone quickly and easily through the www.ConserveGeorgia.org Web portal.

Some specific examples of conservation programs that are highlighted by Conserve Georgia include the following.

Energy: The goal of the Governor’s Energy Challenge is to reduce energy consumption by 15 percent by 2020 in all state facilities. By reducing energy levels to meet the Governor’s goal, Georgia taxpayers could save $12 million annually.

Land: Through the Georgia Land Conservation Program, more than 90,000 acres (360 km^{2}) in Georgia have been permanently conserved for current and future generations to use and enjoy.

Water: The Georgia Department of Natural Resources, Environmental Protection Division, in partnership with individuals representing the diverse water users of the state, created the Water Conservation Implementation Plan (WCIP) to help create a culture of conservation and guide Georgians toward more efficient use of our state’s finite water resources.

Conserve Georgia Awards
The annual Conserve Georgia Awards are open to any individual, business, organization or local government entity for the conservation of energy, land, wildlife and water; the improvement of air quality; the prevention of litter; and the promotion of recycling. The awards program was developed based on community interest in recognizing individuals and organizations that are leading the way in creating a culture of conservation.
