= Doug Stoner =

American politician

Member of the Georgia House of Representatives
- In office January 9, 2023 – January 13, 2025
- Preceded by: Erick Allen
- Constituency: 40th
- In office January 13, 2003 – January 10, 2005
- Constituency: 34th

Member of the Georgia Senate from the 6th district
- In office January 10, 2005 – January 14, 2013
- Preceded by: Ginger Collins
- Succeeded by: Hunter Hill

Personal details
- Born: South Cobb, Georgia
- Party: Democratic
- Education: Kennesaw State University

Doug Stoner, a member of the Democratic Party, is a member of the Georgia House of Representatives, a former member of the Georgia State Senate, and a former candidate to be chairman of the Georgia Democratic Party. He ran in the 2018 Democratic primary for District 5's seat on the Georgia Public Service Commission, which is currently held by a Republican, Tricia Pridemore. Stoner lost the primary to Dawn Randolph on May 22, 2018.

== Personal life and education ==
Stoner attended Kennesaw State University. He has a wife, Della, and two children.

== Political career ==
Stoner was elected to the Georgia House of Representatives in 2002, and to the Georgia Senate in 2004 to 2013. Stoner served on the Economic Development, MARTOC, Retirement, State and Local Governmental, Operations, Transportation, and Urban Affairs committees. He won a second non-consecutive term to the House in 2022 but retired after his district was redrawn more favorably to Republicans.

Stoner is the owner of a Dairy Queen. Stoner also served as a senior business development manager at Akins, Ltd.

Stoner ran for Chairman of the Georgia Democratic Party in an August 2013 special election. He was endorsed by Atlanta Mayor Kasim Reed and former Governor Roy Barnes but lost to former State Representative DuBose Porter.
