= Georgia's 40th House of Representatives district =

State district in Georgia, USA

Georgia's 40th State House of Representatives district
Representative
Kimberly New; R–Villa Rica
- Demographics: 58.2% White; 24.2% Black; 6.2% Hispanic; 9.0% Asian
- Population: 59,326

District 40 elects one member of the Georgia House of Representatives. It contains parts of Cobb County.

== Members ==
- Rich Golick (1998–2019)
- Erick Allen (2019–2023)
- Doug Stoner (2023–2025)
- Kimberly New (since 2025)
