= Landscape conservation cooperatives =

US network of nature conservation bodies

The Landscape Conservation Cooperatives (LCC), established in 2009 in the United States, are a network of 22 regional conservation bodies covering the entire United States and adjacent areas. They are autonomous cooperatives sponsored by the U.S. Department of the Interior and aim to develop coordinated conservation strategies applicable to large areas of land. Partnerships are formed with government and non-government conservation organizations to achieve common goals of conservation. While fairly new as government supported entities, the LCCs are similar to initiatives that have been started or advocated in other countries.

== Description ==
In response to rapid changes in large land and marine landscapes, uncertain environmental and social changes, conservation organizations need to overcome barriers to cooperation. These conservation organizations need to build governance structures, combine ecological, biological and physical sciences with social science insights, and the incorporation of new information to become capable of achieving the combined LCC goals. In some cases, LCCs cross borders and differing goals need to be accommodated by multiple LCCs and other conservation entities. Governance of the LCCs has been a barrier to their successful implementation in the United States. It has been suggested that the Adaptive Common Governance Framework, a social network supported by differing conservation stakeholders will provide the platform for building relationships, enhancing stakeholder engagement, allowing the potential partnering entities to create a working environment of adaptive co-governance. As an example, Rural credit cooperatives are a network of government and non-government protection organizations that promote the protection of rapidly changing social ecosystems by providing the structure and incentives for collaboration and shared learning.

Landscape Conservation

Modern landscape planning and design coordinates the relationship between people and nature in the process of human development, social progress and natural evolution. Landscape planning research covers topics such as land development, land use, and environmental quality. Troll proposed the concept of "landscape ecology." The landscape was viewed as "the whole of the space and everything that the vision touches in the human living environment." Buchwald believes that the so-called landscape can be understood as a comprehensive feature of a certain space on the surface. Egler proposed the concept of total human ecosystem. Dansereau advocates the use of "human ecology" to study the impact of humans on the landscape. McHarg proposed to use the entire human ecosystem as a target for landscape ecology and landscape ecological planning. The process of landscape planning is to help people living in natural systems or using the resources in the system to find the most appropriate route (McHarg, 1969). It is a plan based on ecological theory and knowledge (Sedon, 1986, Leita and Ahern, 2002).

Landscape ecology considers the lithosphere, biosphere and wisdom circle in the human living space as an integral part of the overall human ecosystem, and studies the structural and functional relationships between the various landscape elements (relatively homogeneous ecosystems). Landscape ecology is the guiding theory of landscape ecological design. The landscape ecological design with the information society as the background is the process of human beings to actively arrange and coordinate the elements of the overall landscape (including natural and cultural). All elements of the landscape as a design variable and goal, ultimately optimize the landscape system structure and function. Landscape planning provides a comprehensive solution through close collaboration with spatial planning. Landscape planning has gradually expanded to the areas of river basin planning, regional planning, land planning, and ecological remediation and restoration. The objects directly faced by landscape planning have been extended to the land complex.

Landscape planning is a material spatial plan with the overall goal of achieving sustainable landscapes or ecosystems through land and natural resource conservation and use planning. Landscape ecological planning has the following basic principles: natural priority principle, overall design principle, design adaptability principle and multidisciplinary comprehensive principle. Beta Langfi pointed out that "it is not only to study parts and processes in isolation, but also to study the interaction of various parts. The organism should be considered as a whole or system. Environmental protection requires systematic thinking. Landscape planning is required for overall planning.

== Implementation ==
Maintaining biodiversity by protecting a representative and well-connected habitat network in a managed landscape requires wisely protecting, managing, and restoring habitats on multiple scales. Scholars suggest that the integration of natural sciences and social sciences in the form of "two-dimensional gap analysis" is an effective tool for implementing biodiversity policies. The tool links biologically relevant "horizontal" ecological issues to "vertical" issues related to institutions and other social issues. Taking forest biodiversity as an example, it illustrates how to combine the ecological and institutional aspects of biodiversity conservation to promote environmentally sustainable regional development. In particular, people use regional gap analysis to identify local forest types and determine habitat modeling for "green infrastructure" functional connectivity as a tool for horizontal gap analysis. For the vertical dimension, it is suggested how to assess the success of social sciences in implementing biodiversity policies in real landscapes by identifying institutional barriers when implementing policies. It is believed that this interdisciplinary approach can be applied to a range of other environments, including other terrestrial biota and aquatic ecosystems, where functional habitat connectivity, non-linear response to habitat loss, and multiple economic and social benefits occur together in the same landscape.

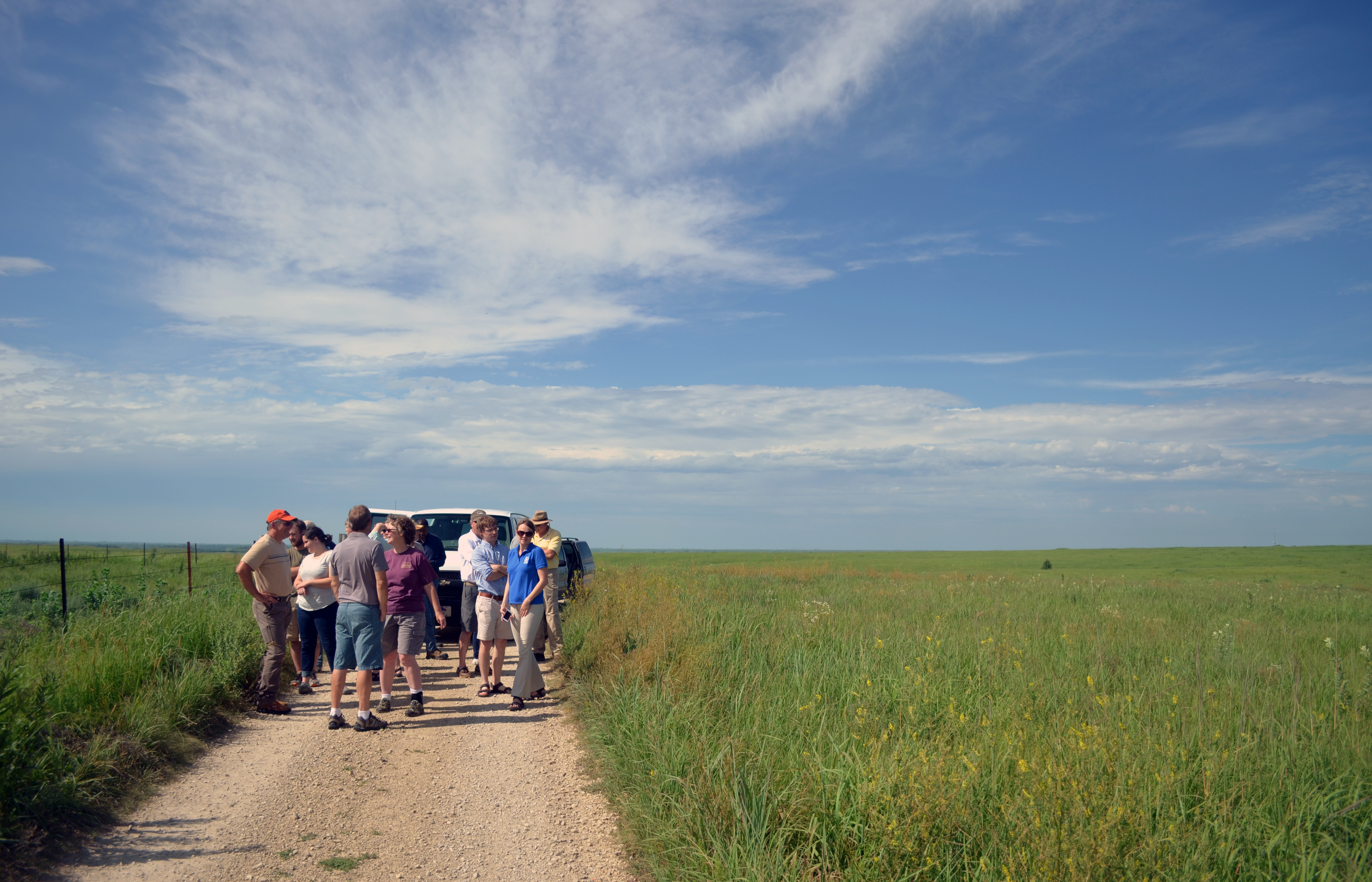
Landscape conservation partners at Konza Prairie

There is a clear need for policies and practices that integrate biodiversity issues into sectors outside the protected area, especially in view of the local authorities’ extensive decentralization of land use decisions. Therefore, people must develop systematic (target-driven) protection planning products that are both user-friendly and useful to users, and are applicable to local government officials, consultants, and elected decision makers. Through the systematic conservation planning assessment of subtropical jungle biomes in South Africa, implementation opportunities and constraints are considered from the outset to work with stakeholders to develop products (maps and guides) that can be used for local government land use planning.

Assessing joint input with stakeholders, developed (i) Mega Conservancy Networks, a multi-ownership large conservation corridor for biodiversity processes; (ii) protection status categories for all biodiversity characteristics (extremely endangered), endangered, fragile, not currently vulnerable), achieving conservation goals based on existing habitats, and (iii) integrating (i) and (ii). The map was further explained to municipal decision makers through the corresponding land use guidelines for each type of conservation status. To raise awareness of the value of biodiversity and its services, a handbook was prepared, which also introduces new and upcoming environmental legislation. Within 18 months of producing these products, the evidence that maps and their guidelines are effectively integrated or mainstreamed into land-use planning is encouraging. However, there is still a need to increase efforts to raise awareness of the value of biodiversity and its services among many stakeholder groups. Despite this, the way people plan to implement by considering the needs and obligations of end users has produced positive results. Finally, suggestions for further improvements are proposed.

== Influence ==
In 2010, Arctic LLC provided approximately $2 million in funding for climate-related research and data integration, and provided the same amount of support through in-kind contributions to the workforce and funding from other agencies and NGOs. One product of this initial cycle is the report "Integrating the Alaska Landscape into the Future." The project uses a climate envelope model approach to assess how future climate scenarios match the average temperature and precipitation conditions from 2000 to 2009. The results indicate that approximately 60% of Alaska may be transformed into a new climatic biome in the twenty-first century. .

In 2011, approximately $1.3 million in funding from the Arctic LCC and $1 million in leverage will support more than 20 different research and data integration projects. With the development of a long-term scientific plan, the ALCC Steering Committee makes a temporary selection of proposals based on responsiveness, feasibility, level of cooperation, response to management issues, and many other criteria for ALCC objectives. Currently, six technical working groups – permafrost, coastal processes, climate simulation, hydrology, Arctic biology and geospatial data – provide input for the development of the Arctic LCC Science Program, which will guide future project financing strategies. The draft plan will be published at the end of 2011.

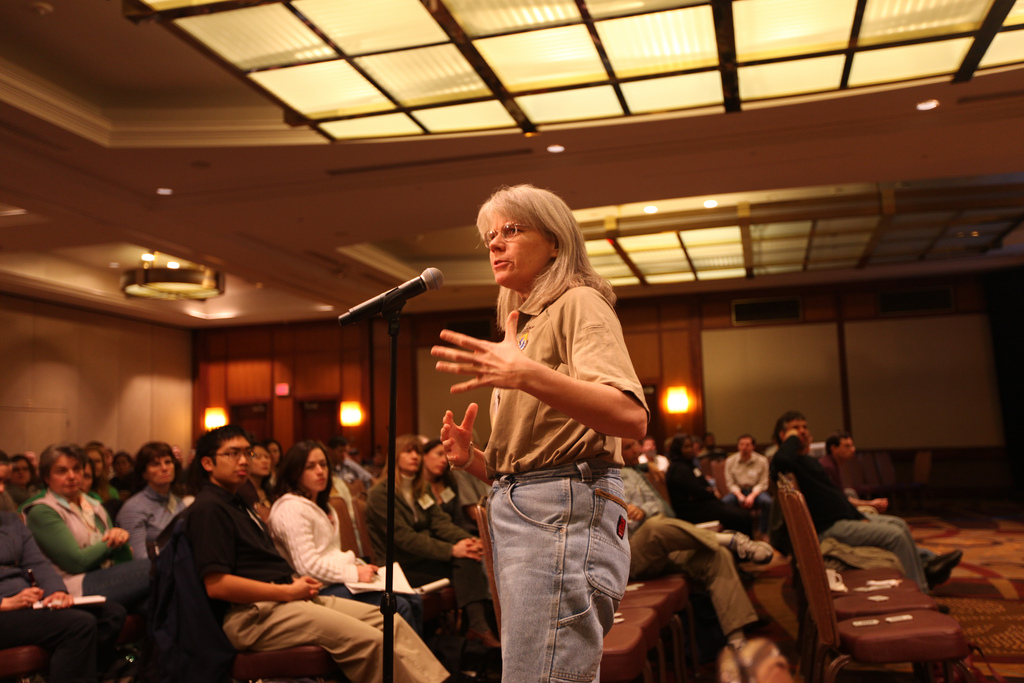
Landscape Conservation Cooperatives Influence

As the area covered by natural ecosystems decreases, the protection of tropical biodiversity in agricultural landscapes becomes even more important. The Shadow Coffee Cooperative in El Salvador analyzed the impact of local livelihoods, types of cooperation and selected biophysical variables (altitude, slope, percent shade, forest distance, coffee density and coffee age) on tree biodiversity.

The tree stock of 51 samples from the coffee cooperative included 2,743 individuals from 46 families and 123 identified tree species. Some cooperatives have different species richness and diameter, and the greater the abundance, the greater the stem density; other biophysical variables have little effect on diversity. The amount of shadows in coffee plantations varies among cooperatives, especially during the rainy season. Among the species recently reported in a study of neighboring forests and cooperatives (N = 227 species), 16% were present in two locations. Three coffee plantations account for 35% of the total number of species reported by all cooperatives.

Studies have shown that the number of tree species found in coffee plantations increases with the density of shady trees contained in the system. In turn, agro-ecological management influenced by farmers' livelihood strategies and types of cooperation directly affects the composition of the shady canopy. Important factors to consider are the type of farmer organization, the cost of maintaining protected species, and the potential benefits of protecting a livelihood strategy that may be for farmers.

== Consequence ==
The field of system protection planning has matured to the extent that it can be effectively applied. Influenced by everything from computer science to conservation biology, it uses a quantitative geospatial approach to spatially prioritize conservation decisions (Ball et al. 2009). The basic feature is to protect ecosystems, species, and processes in the network that are related to environmental change and that can adapt to environmental changes (Anderson, 2014). The LCC system is very broad in space and is well suited to applied science to achieve these outcomes: (a) the layout of core protected areas, (b) creating network connectivity to address climate change, and (c) assessing land-use vulnerability changes, (d) combine social constraints with biodiversity and ecosystem services goals, and (e) compare options.

Landscape Conservation Cooperatives Consequence

While system protection plans require a large data set on protection goals, the LCC structure helps capture this data, saving money when partners share data and expertise. LCC Science is conducted by conservation scientists from academic institutions, private companies and NGOs. As stakeholder engagement improves the science of systems protection planning, this collective "bottom-up" approach provides modelers with a source of expertise that is critical to establishing conservation goals, setting goals and reviewing results. . . Finally, the LCC structure is exactly the same as the dissemination results, because the collaborators form a channel back to their institutions, organizations, institutions and the public. Twenty-two low-cost lines are further connected to the National Network Coordinator and Small Employee Network.

LCC has previously implemented multi-state and non-governmental organization wildlife conservation initiatives. However, these are difficult to maintain because there are no federally-managed cooperatives to fund and organize the required spatially clear data to help prioritize regional protection spending. When rural information centers focus on the entire landscape, species and ecosystems, ecological processes, human impacts and interests, and priorities for time and space actions, they often plan (if implemented) to protect the country's biodiversity.

== Trump administration cuts ==
Around April 2019, the Trump administration reportedly withdrew LCC funding, against the instructions of Congress, causing 16 of the 22 LCCs to close or enter hiatus.
