= Rich Golick =

American politician

Richard Marshall "Rich" Golick (born September 18, 1966, in Honolulu, Hawaii) is former a member of the Georgia House of Representatives in the U.S. state of Georgia. Golick is a Republican, and represented District 40, which encompassed parts of southeastern Cobb County.

In 2016, he was re-elected to his tenth term in this seat, defeating Democratic challenger Erick Allen by 7 points. He was succeeded by Allen after not running for re-election in 2018, and left office in January 2019.

== Biography ==
Golick received a degree in political science from Emory University and a law degree from Georgia State University. Golick is a member of several civic groups in his hometown of Smyrna, Georgia. He is married to Maria Golick, a State Court Judge in Cobb County, with whom he has two sons, Marshall and Davis.

== As state representative ==
Golick was elected to the Georgia House of Representatives in 1998. Golick served as Senior Administration Floor Leader under governor Sonny Perdue. Golick is a member of the Appropriations, Insurance, and Judiciary committees and serves as Chairman of the Judiciary Non-Civil committee.

During the 2005-2006 legislative session, Golick co-sponsored several important pieces of legislation, including potential amendments to the state constitution. H.R. 1045, which would have tightened restrictions on the uses of money used to fund the HOPE scholarship program, was defeated, while H.R. 1306, which would place new restrictions on the government's ability to use eminent domain, passed for and will be included on the November ballot for approval by Georgia voters.

In March 2017, a bill in the Georgia House drew criticism because it would increase the number of white voters in District 40 by about 5,000, while decreasing the number of black voters there by about 2,000. Golick, who has held the seat from this district since 1999, voted in favor of the bill. Golick's unsuccessful 2016 challenger, Erick Allen, called the bill a "blatant effort" by Republicans to keep Democrats from defeating them in the district.
