= Bruce Chorpita =

American clinical psychologist (born 1967)

Bruce F. Chorpita
- Born: Bruce Frederick Chorpita; February 25, 1967 (age 59)
- Education: Brown University (AB), University at Albany, SUNY (MA), University at Albany, SUNY (PhD)
- Known for: Modular mental health treatment; Mental health system and resource design; Practice element ontologies ("common elements") in mental health interventions
- Scientific career
- Fields: Clinical Psychology, Implementation Science
- Workplaces: UCLA
- Website: www.childfirst.ucla.edu

Bruce F. Chorpita (born February 25, 1967), is an American researcher and clinical psychologist who has worked in multiple academic and government leadership positions addressing youth mental health and improvement of clinical practice. He is Distinguished Professor of Psychology and Professor of Psychiatry and Biobehavioral Sciences at the University of California, Los Angeles. He received his Ph.D. in psychology from the University at Albany, State University of New York. He is widely published in the areas of children's mental health services, with funding from the National Institute of Mental Health, the Hawaii Departments of Education and Health, the John D. and Catherine T. MacArthur Foundation, the Annie E. Casey Foundation, the Wellcome Trust, and the William T. Grant Foundation.

== Education ==
In May 1989, Chorpita graduated from Brown University in Providence, Rhode Island with a Bachelor of Arts in Psychology. Following the completion of his undergraduate career, Chorpita went on to pursue a doctoral degree from the University at Albany, under the mentorship of David H. Barlow, Ph.D, ABPP. While at the University at Albany, Chorpita authored his thesis, Family Influences on Cognitive Processing in Children with Anxiety, as well as his dissertation, Influences of Over-Controlling Parenting Style on Anxiety and Negative Affect: An Evaluation of Preliminary Structural Etiological Models. Chorpita completed his Pre-doctoral Clinical Residency at the University of Mississippi Medical Center in Jackson, Mississippi under the mentorship of Ronald S. Drabman, Ph.D, ABPP. Chorpita was awarded his Ph.D. in Clinical Psychology from the University at Albany in Albany, New York in August 1997.

== Positions ==
Chorpita served as the 53rd President of the Association for Behavioral and Cognitive Therapies. He also held the position of Clinical Director of the Child and Adolescent Mental Health Division of the Hawaii State Department of Health, serving between 2001 and 2003. Chorpita held a faculty position with the Department of Psychology at the University of Hawaii between 1997 and 2008.

Chorpita served as the lead developer for the intensive treatment component of PRIDE, a project designed around the aim of developing, testing, and disseminating effective treatments and training modules for lay counselors to address anxiety, depression, and anger problems among adolescents in India. As part of his work with PRIDE, Chorpita worked closely with Vikram Patel, who served as Principal Investigator of the project.

From 2021 to 2022, Chorpita served the National Academy of Sciences as a Committee Member for Accelerating Behavioral Science Through Ontology Development and Use. As a component of this position, Chorpita worked with a team of scientists to establish a commitment to a shared conceptualization and set of terms and relationships within the field of behavioral science. The mission of this work is to help set the stage for scientific discovery, evidence retrieval and application (e.g. through clinical knowledge appliances), and automated reasoning.

Chorpita serves on the Board of Directors for PracticeWise, LLC, a consulting organization he co-founded in 2004 with Eric Daleiden, focused on providing decision support products and services to mental health organizations, providers, and students on an international scale. PracticeWise centers its efforts on a scientific and evidence-based approach. PracticeWise regularly publishes a report detailing current evidence-based child and adolescent psycho-social interventions for the American Academy of Pediatrics.

Chorpita is the current director of the Child FIRST Program at UCLA, whose work aims to improve the effectiveness of mental health service delivery to children. Child FIRST strives to advance mental health treatment design, clinical decision-making, information delivery models, mental health system architecture, and mental health system processes with the interest of bettering children's health primarily in mind. Child FIRST creates and maintains partnerships with community agencies to deliver mental health services both throughout California, and the country as a whole.

Chorpita currently holds the roles of Distinguished Professor in the University of California, Los Angeles Department of Psychology and Department of Psychiatry and Biobehavioral Sciences. Chorpita's primary area of study is Clinical Psychology.

== Research ==
Chorpita has published in the area of child and adolescent mental health services, and has authored research pertaining to the evidence-based examination and treatment of childhood anxiety disorders. Chorpita has authored more than 350 scientific papers and in 2006 published one of the first books on modular cognitive behavior therapy with Guilford Press. Chorpita's research centers around the primary area of Clinical Psychology, with the central aim of advancing the effectiveness of current mental health practice technologies for children and adolescents, through evidence-based approaches. Chorpita is the lead author of the protocol, along with John R. Weisz, an evidence-based treatment that outperformed multiple other evidence-based treatments in two randomized effectiveness trials in three different states. Chorpita's ongoing research is aimed at improving the effectiveness of mental health service systems for children through innovation in mental health treatment design, clinical decision-making, information-delivery models, and service system architecture.

== Honors and awards ==
Throughout his academic career, Chorpita has held research and training grants from the National Institute of Mental Health, the Hawaii Departments of Education and Health, Los Angeles County Department of Mental Health, the John D. and Catherine T. MacArthur Foundation, as well as the Annie E. Casey Foundation, receiving a sum exceeding twenty-five million dollars in research funding.

Honors and Awards
| Date | Recipient | Award Title | Awarding organization |
|---|---|---|---|
| October 2002 | Bruce F. Chorpita | Significant Professional Contribution Award for significant scholarly contributions and achievements in Psychology | Hawaii Psychological Association |
| June 2004 | Evidence Based Services Committee with Bruce F. Chorpita as Chair | Team of the Year Award | State Director of Health and the Hawaii Department of Health |
| October 2004 | Evidence Based Services Committee with Bruce F. Chorpita as Chair | Governor's Award Honoree | Governor Linda Lingle and the Hawaii Department of Human Resources Development |
| May 2005 | Bruce F. Chorpita | Medal for Excellence in Research | University of Hawaii Board of Regents |
| April 2006 | Bruce F. Chorpita | Excellence in Research Award | University of Hawaii College of Social Sciences |

== Selected publications ==
Below is a selection of Chorpita's most frequently cited and pivotal work.

- Brown, T. A., Chorpita, B. F., Korotitsch, W, Barlow, D. H. (1997). Psychometric properties of the Depression Anxiety Stress Scales (DASS) in clinical samples. Behavior Research and Therapy, 35(1), 79-89. doi:10.1016/S0005-7967(96)00068-X
- Chorpita, B. F., Barlow, D. H. (1998). The development of anxiety: The role of control in the early environment. Psychological Bulletin, 124(1), 3-21. American Psychological Association.
- Brown, T. A., Chorpita, B. F., Barlow, D. H. (1998, May). Structural relationships among dimensions of the DSM-IV anxiety and mood disorders and dimensions of negative affect, positive affect, and autonomic arousal. In Journal of abnormal psychology (Vol. 107(2), pp. 179–192). American Psychological Association. doi:10.1037/0021-843X.107.2.179
- Chorpita, B. F., Yim, L., Moffitt, C., Umemoto, L. A., Francis, S. E. (2000, January). Assessment of symptoms of DSM-IV anxiety and depression in children: A revised child anxiety and depression scale. In Behaviour research and therapy (Vol. 38(8), pp. 835–855). Pergamon. doi:10.1016/S0005-7967(99)00130-8
- Weisz, J. R., Chorpita, B. F., Palinkas, L. A., Schoenwald, S. K, Miranda, J., Bearman, S. K., Daleiden, E. L., Ugueto, A. M., Ho, A., Martin, J., Gray, J., Alleyne, A., Langer, D. A., Southam-Gerow, M. A., Gibbons, R. D., Research Network on Youth Mental Health (2012, March). Testing standard and modular designs for psychotherapy treating depression, anxiety, and conduct problems in youth: A randomized effectiveness trial. In Archives of general psychiatry (Vol. 69(3), pp. 274–282). American Medical Association. doi:10.1001/archgenpsychiatry.2011.147
- Albano, A. M., Chorpita, B. F., Barlow, D. H. (2003). Childhood anxiety disorders. In Child psychopathology (pp. 279–329). Guilford Press. via APA PsycInfo.
