= Great Basin =

Large depression in western North America

Great Basin in North America
- Endorheic basin
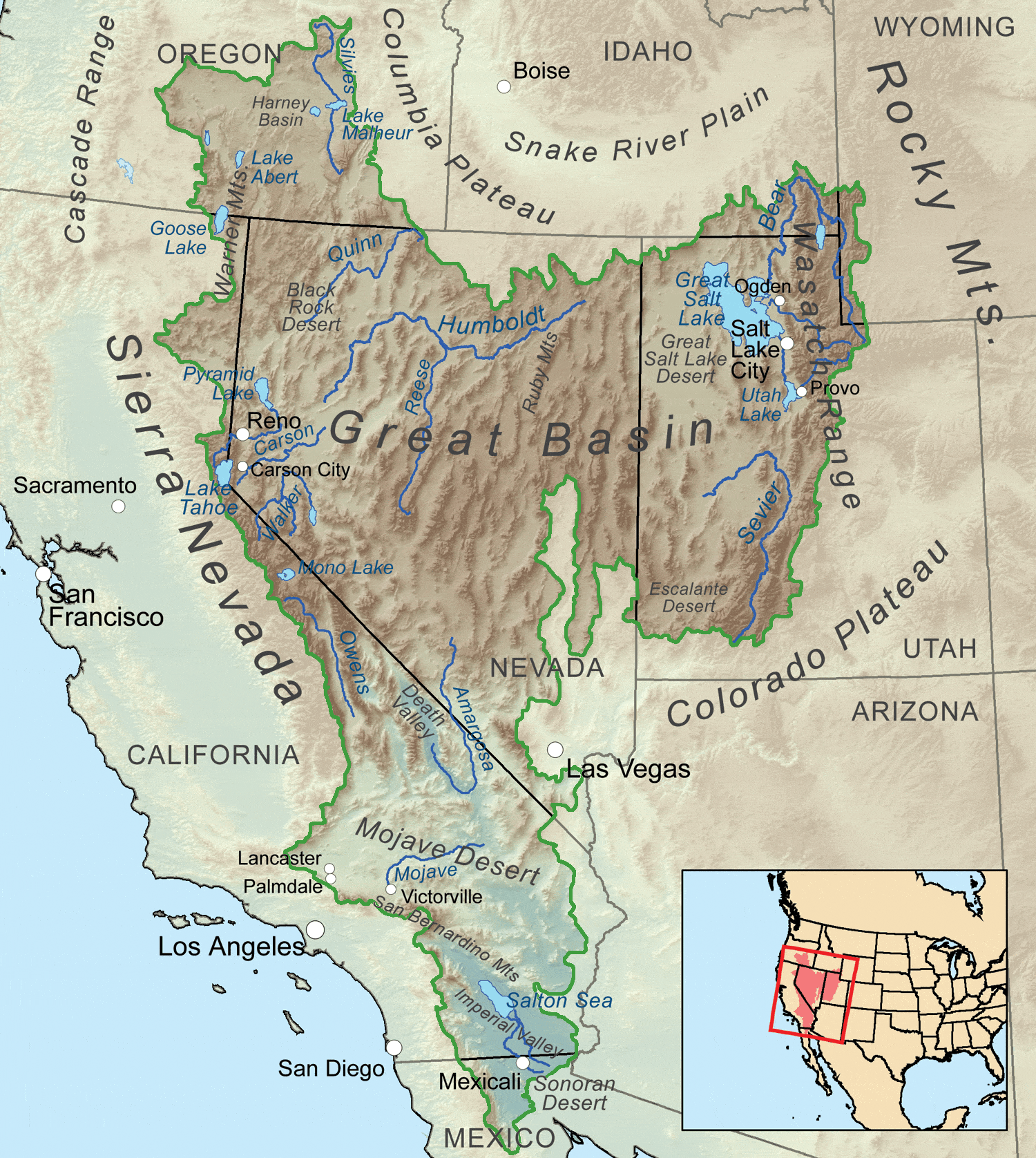
- Relief map with Great Basin overlay
- Coordinates: 40°40′N 117°40′W
- Location: United States, Mexico

Area
  - Total: 209,162 mi^{2} (541,730 km^{2})
- Highest elevation: 14,505 ft (4,421 m) (Mount Whitney summit)
- Lowest elevation: −282 ft (−86 m) (Badwater Basin, Death Valley)

The Great Basin (Spanish: Gran Cuenca) is the largest area of contiguous endorheic watersheds, those with no outlets to the ocean, in North America. It spans nearly all of Nevada, much of Utah, and portions of California, Idaho, Oregon, Wyoming, and Baja California. It is noted for both its arid climate and the basin and range topography that varies from the North American low point at Badwater Basin in Death Valley to the highest point of the contiguous United States, less than 100 miles (160 km) away at the summit of Mount Whitney. The region spans several physiographic divisions, biomes, ecoregions, and deserts.

== Definition ==
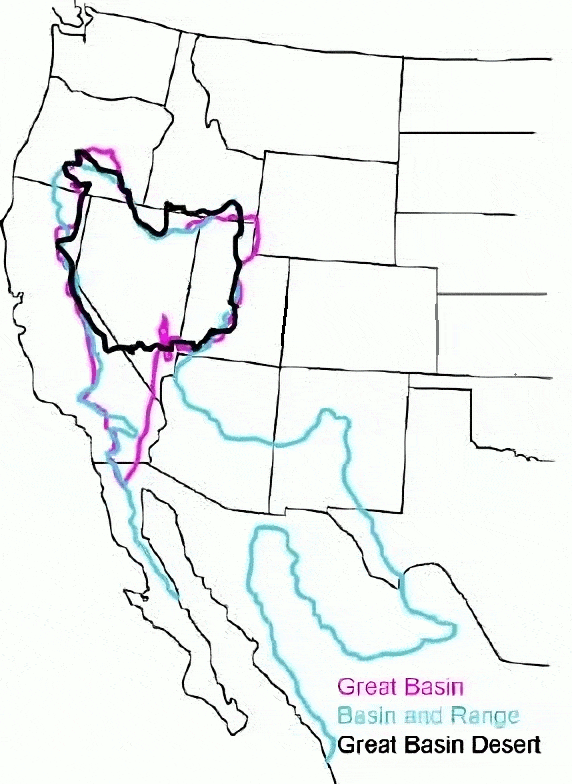
The hydrographic Great Basin (magenta outline), distinguished from the Great Basin Desert (black), and the Basin and Range Geological Province (teal).

The term "Great Basin" is applied to hydrographic, biological, floristic, physiographic, topographic, and ethnographic geographic areas. The name was originally coined by John C. Frémont, who, based on information gleaned from Joseph R. Walker as well as his own travels, recognized the hydrographic nature of the landform as "having no connection to the ocean". The hydrographic definition is the most commonly used, and is the only one with a definitive border. The other definitions yield not only different geographical boundaries of "Great Basin" regions but regional borders that vary from source to source.

The Great Basin Desert is defined by plant and animal communities, and, according to the National Park Service, its boundaries approximate the hydrographic Great Basin but exclude the southern "panhandle".

The Great Basin Province was defined by botanist Armen Takhtajan to extend well beyond the boundaries of the hydrographically defined Great Basin: it includes the Snake River Plain, the Colorado Plateau, the Uinta Basin, and parts of Arizona north of the Mogollon Rim.

The Great Basin physiographic section is a geographic division of the Basin and Range Province defined by Nevin Fenneman in 1931. The United States Geological Survey adapted Fenneman's scheme in their Physiographic division of the United States. The "section" is somewhat larger than the hydrographic definition.

The Great Basin culture area, or indigenous peoples of the Great Basin, is a cultural classification of indigenous peoples of the Americas and a cultural region located between the Rocky Mountains and the Sierra Nevada. The culture area covers approximately 400,000 sq mi (1,000,000 km^{2}), or just less than twice the area of the hydrographic Great Basin.

== Hydrology ==
The hydrographics Great Basin is a 209,162-square-mile (541,730 km^{2}) area that once drained internally. All precipitation in the region evaporated, sank underground or flowed into lakes (mostly saline). As observed by Fremont, creeks, streams, or rivers find no outlet to either the Gulf of Mexico or the Pacific Ocean. The region is bounded by the Wasatch Mountains to the east, the Sierra Nevada and Cascade Ranges to the west, and the Snake River Basin to the north. The south rim is less distinct. The Great Basin includes most of Nevada, half of Utah, substantial portions of Oregon and California, and small areas of Idaho, Wyoming, and Baja California, Mexico. The term "Great Basin" is slightly misleading; the region comprises many small basins. The Great Salt Lake, Pyramid Lake, and the Humboldt Sink are a few of the "drains" in the Great Basin. The Salton Sink is another closed basin within the Great Basin.

The Great Basin Divide separates the Great Basin from the watersheds draining to the Pacific Ocean. The southernmost portion of the Great Basin is the watershed area of the Laguna Salada. The Great Basin's longest and largest river is the Bear River of 350 mi (560 km), and the largest single watershed is the Humboldt River drainage of roughly 17,000 sq mi (44,000 km^{2}). Most Great Basin precipitation is snow, and the precipitation that neither evaporates nor is extracted for human use will sink into groundwater aquifers, while evaporation of collected water occurs from geographic sinks. Lake Tahoe, North America's largest alpine lake, is part of the Great Basin's central Lahontan subregion.

== Ecology ==
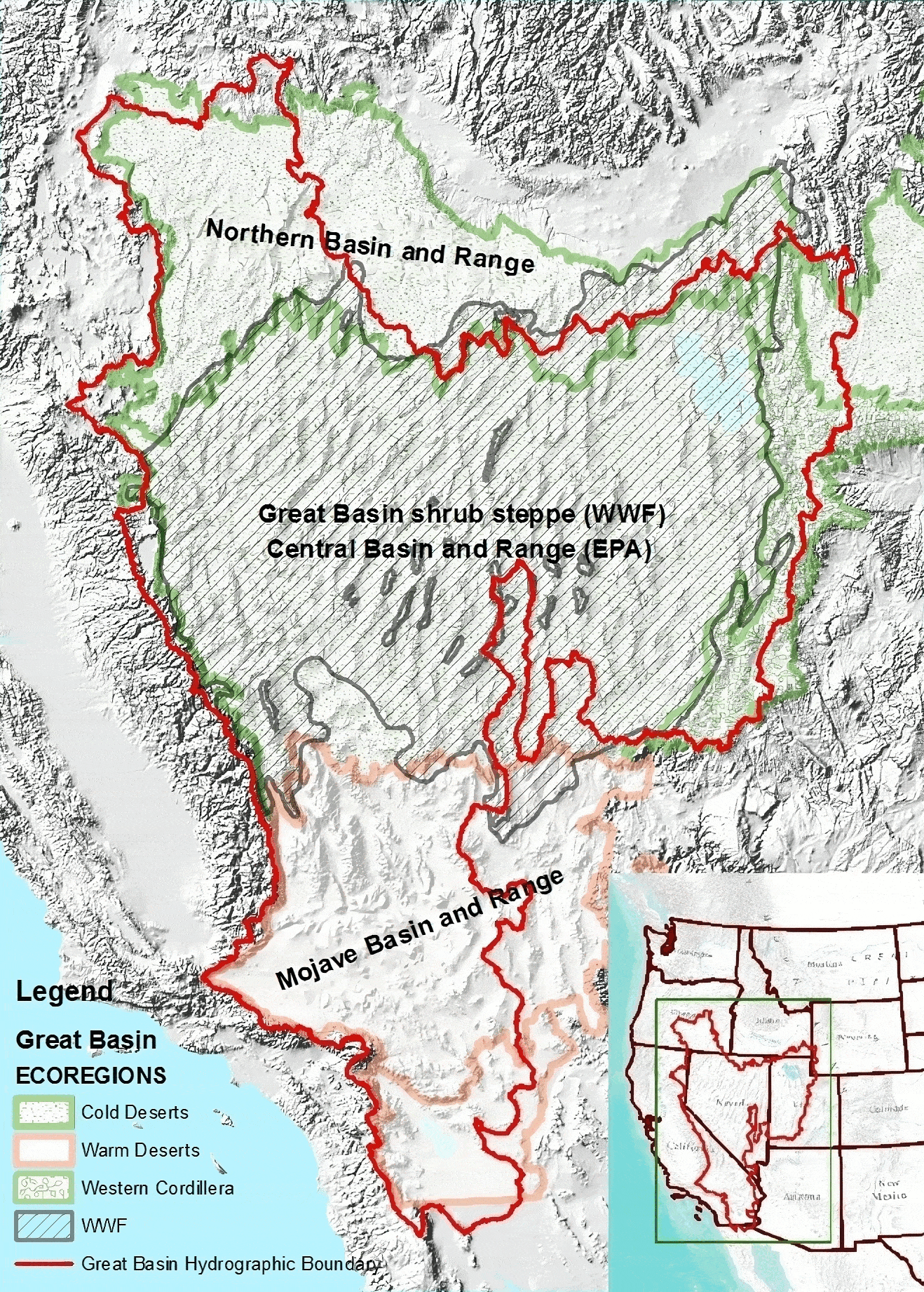
Ecoregions as currently delineated by the Environmental Protection Agency and World Wildlife Fund

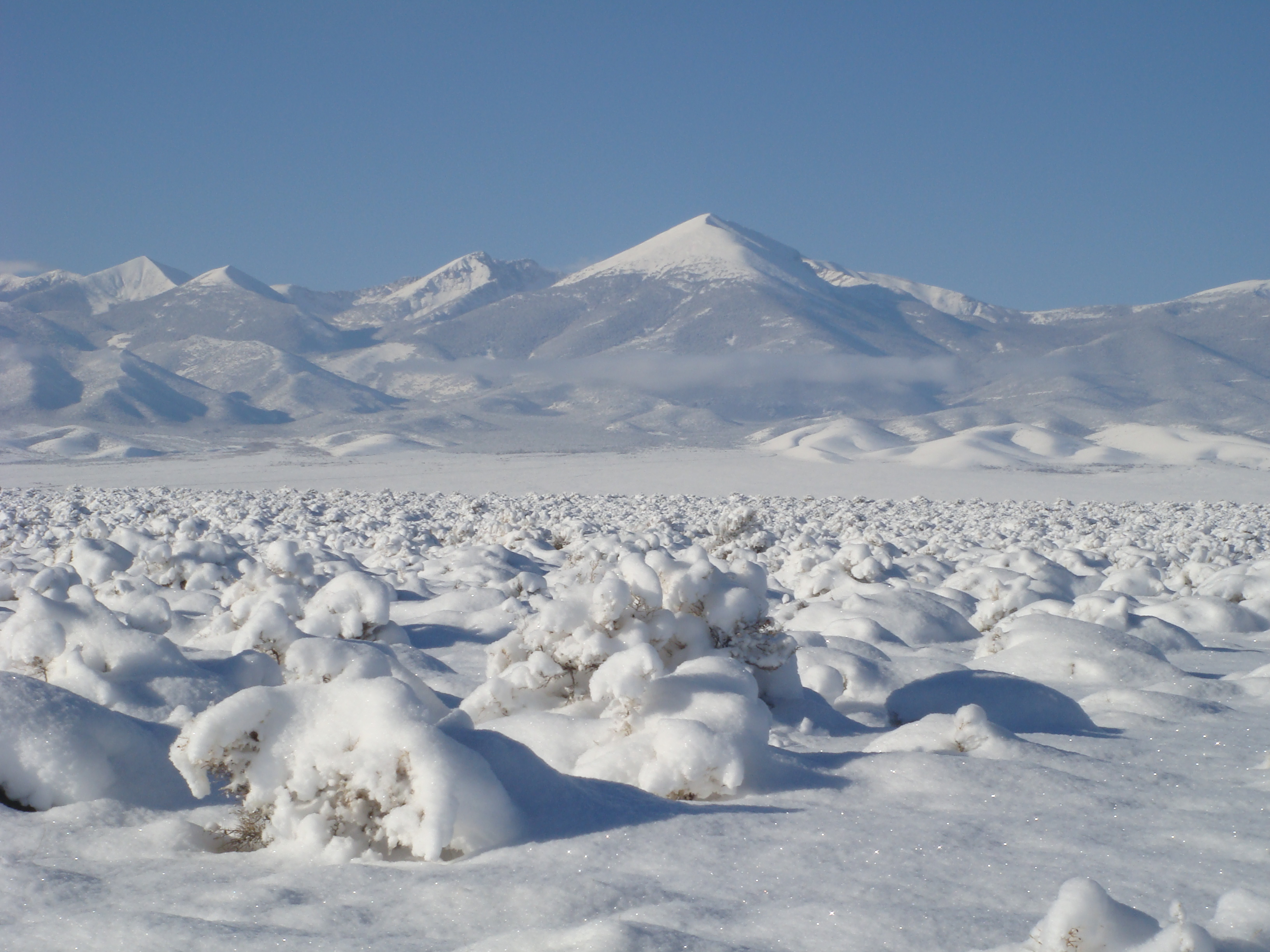
Great Basin snowstorm in the Snake Valley of Utah and Nevada

The hydrographic Great Basin contains multiple deserts and ecoregions, each with its own distinctive set of flora and fauna. The ecological boundaries and divisions in the Great Basin are unclear.

The Great Basin overlaps four different deserts: portions of the hot Mojave and Colorado (a region within the Sonoran Desert) Deserts to the south, and the cold Great Basin and Oregon High Deserts in the north. The deserts can be distinguished by their plants: the Joshua tree and creosote bush occur in the hot deserts, while the cold deserts have neither. The cold deserts are generally higher than the hot and have more even spread of precipitation throughout the year.

The climate and flora of the Great Basin are strongly dependent on elevation; as the elevation increases, the temperature decreases and precipitation increases. Because of this, forests can occur at higher elevations. Utah juniper/single-leaf pinyon (southern regions) and mountain mahogany (northern regions) form open pinyon-juniper woodland on the slopes of most ranges. Stands of limber pine and Great Basin bristlecone pine (Pinus longaeva) can be found in some of the higher ranges. In riparian areas with dependable water cottonwoods (Populus fremontii) and quaking aspen (Populus tremuloides) groves exist.

Because the forest ecosystem is distinct from a typical desert, some authorities, such as the World Wildlife Fund, separate the mountains of the Great Basin desert into their own ecoregion: the Great Basin montane forests. Many rare and endemic species occur in this ecoregion, because the individual mountain ranges are isolated from each other. During the Last Glacial Period, the Great Basin was wetter. As it dried during the Holocene epoch, some species retreated to the higher isolated mountains and have high genetic diversity.

Other authorities divide the Great Basin into different ecoregions, depending on their own criteria. Armen Takhtajan defined the "Great Basin floristic province". The U.S. Environmental Protection Agency divides the Great Basin into three ecoregions roughly according to latitude: the Northern Basin and Range ecoregion, the Central Basin and Range ecoregion, and the Mojave Basin and Range ecoregion.

=== Fauna ===
Great Basin wildlife includes pronghorn, mule deer, mountain lion, and lagomorphs such as black-tailed jackrabbit and desert cottontail and the coyotes that prey on them. Packrats, kangaroo rats and other small rodents are also common, and are predominantly nocturnal. Elk and bighorn sheep are present but uncommon. Small lizards such as the Great Basin fence lizard, longnose leopard lizard and horned lizard are common, especially in lower elevations. Rattlesnakes and gopher snakes are also present. The Inyo Mountains salamander is endangered. Shorebirds such as phalaropes and curlews can be found in wet areas. American white pelicans are common at Pyramid Lake. Golden eagles are also very common in the Great Basin. Mourning dove, western meadowlark, black-billed magpie, and common raven are other common bird species.

Two endangered species of fish are found in Pyramid Lake: the Cui-ui sucker fish (endangered 1967) and the Lahontan cutthroat trout (threatened 1970).

Large invertebrates include tarantulas (genus Aphonopelma) and Mormon crickets. Exotic species, including chukar, grey partridge, and Himalayan snowcock, have been successfully introduced to the Great Basin, although the latter has only thrived in the Ruby Mountains. Cheatgrass, an invasive species which was unintentionally introduced, forms a critical portion of their diets. Feral horses (mustangs) and feral burros are highly reproductive, and ecosystem-controversial, alien species. Most of the Great Basin is open range and domestic cattle and sheep are widespread.

== Geology ==
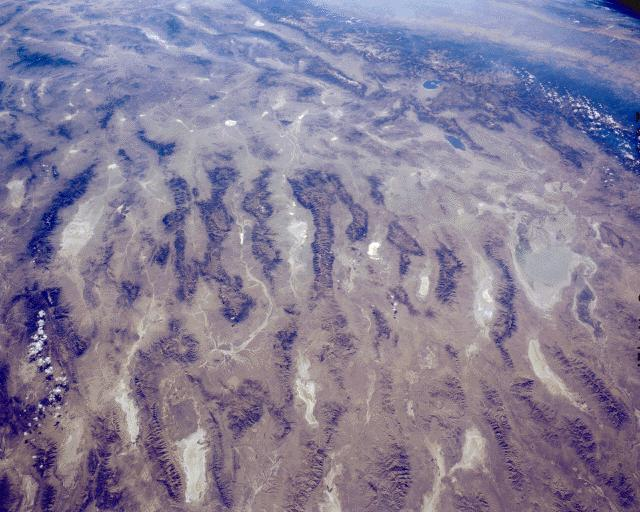
Basin and Range topography as seen from the air

The Great Basin includes valleys, basins, lakes and mountain ranges of the Basin and Range Province.

The basin and range topography is the result of extension and thinning of the lithosphere, which is composed of crust and upper mantle. Extensional environments like the Basin and Range are characterized by listric normal faulting, or faults that level out with depth. Opposing normal faults link at depth producing a horst and graben geometry, where horst refers to the upthrown fault block and graben to the down dropped fault block.

Sediment build-up over thousands of years filled the down-faulted basins between ranges and created relatively flat lacustrine plains from Pleistocene lake beds of the Great Basin. For example, after forming about 32,000 years ago, Lake Bonneville overflowed about 14,500 years ago in the Bonneville Flood through Red Rock Pass and lowered to the "Provo Lake" level (the Great Salt Lake, Utah Lake, Sevier Lake, Rush Lake, and Little Salt Lake remain). Lake Lahontan, Lake Manly, and Lake Mojave were similar Pleistocene lakes.

== Geography ==
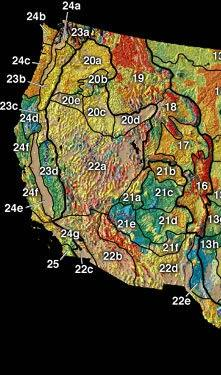
Map showing the Great Basin physiographic section (shown as 22a)

=== Great Basin physiographic section ===
The Great Basin physiographic section of the Basin and Range Province contains the Great Basin, but extends into eastern Oregon, southern Idaho, and the Colorado River watershed and the northwest corner of Arizona. The Basin and Range region is the product of geological forces stretching the Earth's crust, creating many north–south trending mountain ranges. These ranges are separated by flat valleys or basins. These hundreds of ranges make Nevada the most mountainous state in the country.

=== Settlements and roads ===
The Great Basin's two most populous metropolitan areas are the Reno-Sparks metropolitan area to the west and the Salt Lake City centered Wasatch Front to the east (with the latter being significantly more populous than the former). The region between these two areas is sparsely populated, but includes the smaller cities of Elko, Ely, Wendover, West Wendover, and Winnemucca. To the north are; in California Susanville, in Oregon Burns and Hines, in Idaho Malad and in Wyoming Evanston. To the south are Cedar City, Tonopah, and Bishop and the very southern area of the basin has the communities of Pahrump, Palmdale, Victorville, and Palm Springs. Interstate Highways traversing the Great Basin are Interstate 80 (I-80) and I-15, and I-70 and I-84 have their respective endpoints within its boundaries. Other major roadways are U.S. Route 6 (US 6), US 50, US 93, US 95 and US 395. The section of US 50 between Delta, Utah, and Fallon, Nevada, is nicknamed "The Loneliest Road in America", and Nevada State Route 375 is designated the "Extraterrestrial Highway". The Great Basin is traversed by several rail lines including the Union Pacific Railroad's Overland Route (Union Pacific Railroad) through Reno and Ogden, Feather River Route, Central Corridor and Los Angeles and Salt Lake Railroad.

== History ==
=== Indigenous populations ===
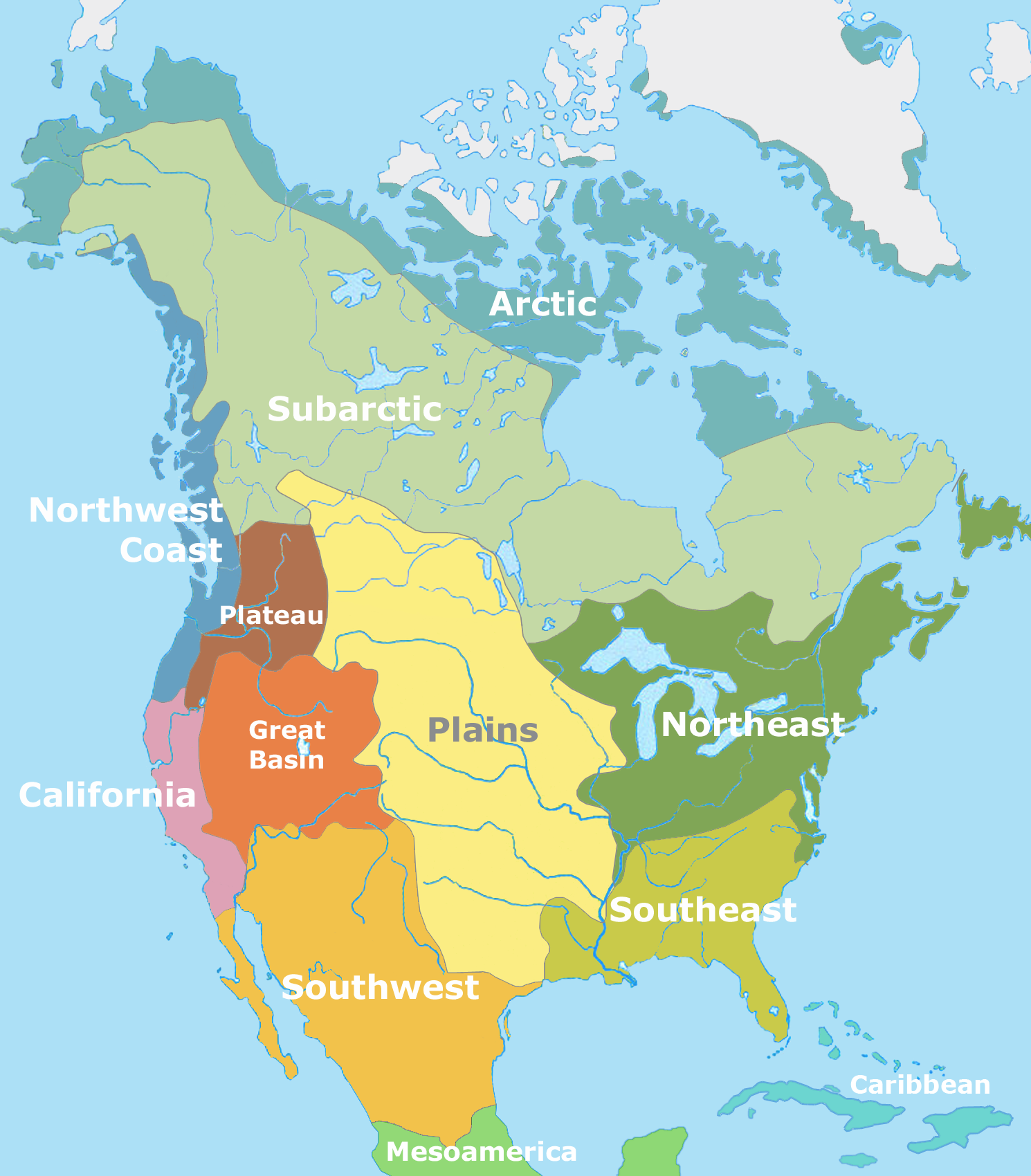
Native American tribes that inhabited the Great Basin were divided between the "Great Basin" and, in the Colorado Desert region, the "California" tribal classifications.

There has been a succession of indigenous peoples of the Great Basin. Paleo-Indian habitation by the Great Basin tribes began as early as 10,000 B.C. . Archaeological evidence of habitation sites along the shore of Lake Lahontan date from the end of the ice age when its shoreline was approximately 500 feet (150 m) higher along the sides of the surrounding mountains. The Paleo-Indians were mainly hunters and hunted bison, the extinct mammoth, and extinct ground sloth. For housing, since they followed the animals they were hunting, they had no permanent villages.

The next group to live in the area was the Great Basin Desert Archaic, from approximately 9,000 to 1,500 years ago. They hunted animals like mule deer and antelope and gathered onions, wild rye, and pinyon pine nuts. Then, from 1,500 to 700 years ago, the Fremont lived in the area. Unlike the Paleo-Indians, who moved around to follow bison herds, the Fremont built small villages and grew crops like corn and squash.

Seven hundred years ago, the Shoshone inhabited the area after the Fremont. They were hunter-gathers and lived in temporary homes to be able to follow animal herds and collect plants. Now, Shoshone descendants live in nearby areas. Other tribes in the area included the Ute, Mono, and Northern Paiute. All of the tribes speak a language in the Numic language group.

To close a 1951 Indian Claims Commission case, the Western Shoshone Claims Distribution Act of 2004 established the United States' payment of $117 million to the Great Basin tribe for the acquisition of 39,000 square miles (100,000 km^{2}).

=== Europeans ===
European exploration of the Great Basin occurred during the 18th century Spanish colonization of the Americas. The first immigrant American to cross the Great Basin from the Sierra Nevada was Jedediah Strong Smith in 1827. Peter Skene Ogden of the British Hudson's Bay Company explored the Great Salt Lake and Humboldt River regions in the late 1820s, following the eastern side of the Sierra Nevada to the Gulf of California. Benjamin Bonneville explored the northeast portion during an 1832 expedition. The United States had acquired claims to the territory north of the 42nd parallel via the 1819 Adams–Onís Treaty with Spain and 1846 Oregon Treaty with Britain. The US gained claims to most of the rest of the Great Basin via the 1848 Mexican Cession. The first non-indigenous settlement was in 1847 in the Great Salt Lake Valley, leading to the first American religious settlement effort of the Mormon provisional State of Deseret in 1849 in present-day Utah and northern Nevada. Later settlements were connected with the eastern regions of the 1848 California Gold Rush, with its immigrants crossing the Great Basin on the California Trail along Nevada's Humboldt River to Carson Pass in the Sierras. The Oregon Territory was established in 1848 and the Utah Territory in 1850.

In 1869 the First transcontinental railroad was completed at Promontory Summit in the Great Basin. Around 1902, the San Pedro, Los Angeles and Salt Lake Railroad was constructed in the lower basin and Mojave Desert for California-Nevada rail service to Las Vegas, Nevada.

== Climate ==
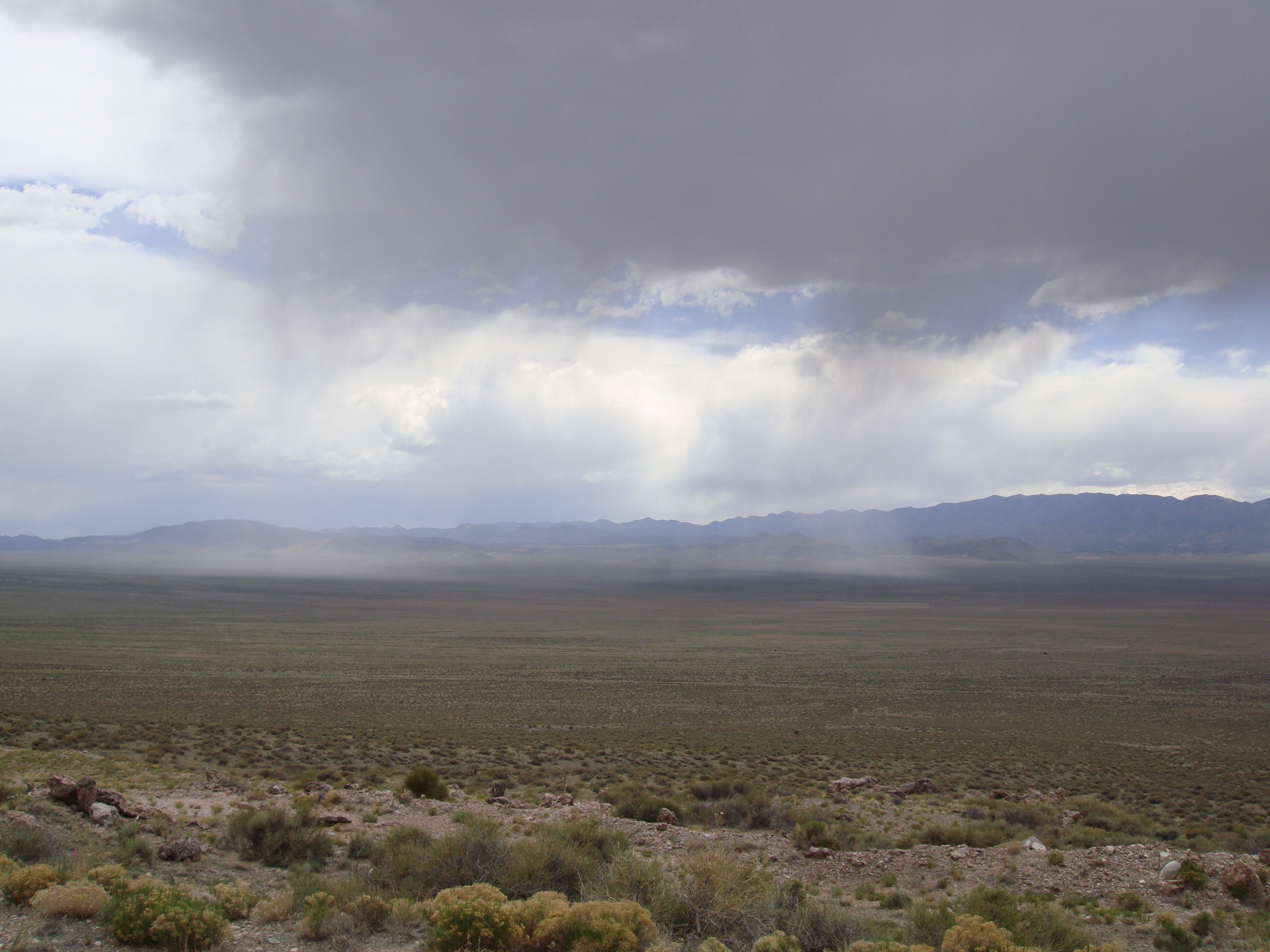
Wah Wah Valley, Utah, thunderstorm

The climate varies throughout the Great Basin by elevation, latitude, and other factors. Higher elevations tend to be cooler and receive more precipitation. The western areas of the basin tend to be drier than the eastern areas because of the rain shadow of the Sierra Nevada. Most of the basin experiences a semi-arid or arid climate with warm summers and cold winters. However, some of the mountainous areas in the basin are high enough in elevation to experience an alpine climate. Due to the region's altitude and aridity, most areas in the Great Basin experience a substantial diurnal temperature variation.

== Significant special designations ==
- Great Basin National Park: President Warren G. Harding created Lehman Caves National Monument by presidential proclamation on January 24, 1922. It was incorporated into the national park on October 27, 1986.
- Death Valley National Park: Death Valley National Monument was designated in 1933, and the park was substantially expanded and became a national park in 1994.
- Joshua Tree National Park was initially created as a National Monument on 10 August 1936, containing 825,000 acres (334,000 ha), after Minerva Hoyt led activism aimed at persuading the state and federal governments at protecting the area. The park was elevated to a National Park on 31 October 1994 by the Desert Protection Act, which also added 234,000 acres to the park.
- Valley of Fire State Park was designated as a National Natural Landmark in 1968
- The Golden Spike National Historic Site was authorized as a National Historic Site under non-federal ownership on April 2, 1957. It was approved for federal ownership and administration by an act of Congress on July 30, 1965. It was redesignated as a National Historical Park in 2019.
- The Juan Bautista de Anza National Historic Trail was designated in 1990.
- The Pony Express and California National Historic Trails were designated in 1992.
- The Mojave National Preserve was established October 31, 1994, with the passage of the California Desert Protection Act by the US Congress.
- The Black Rock Desert–High Rock Canyon Emigrant Trails National Conservation Area was created by the Black Rock Desert–High Rock Canyon Emigrant Trails National Conservation Area Act of 2000.
- The Old Spanish National Historic Trail was designated in 2002.
- The Great Basin National Heritage Area was designated on October 13, 2006, under P.L.109-338
- A section of the Amargosa River was a designated Wild and Scenic River in 2009 and is also a Bureau of Land Management Natural Area.
- The Basin and Range National Monument was designated on July 9, 2015, under the authority of the Antiquities Act by President Barack Obama on the boundary of the Great Basin and Mojave Deserts, encompassing Garden and Coal Valleys in Southern Nevada.

== See also ==
- Bonneville Salt Flats
- Great Basin Landscape Conservation Cooperative
- Hastings Cutoff
- Hidden Cave, an archaeological cave site located in the Great Basin
- Nevada Basin
- Salton Sea
- Indigenous peoples of the Great Basin
