= Paula Barrett =

Australian educationist

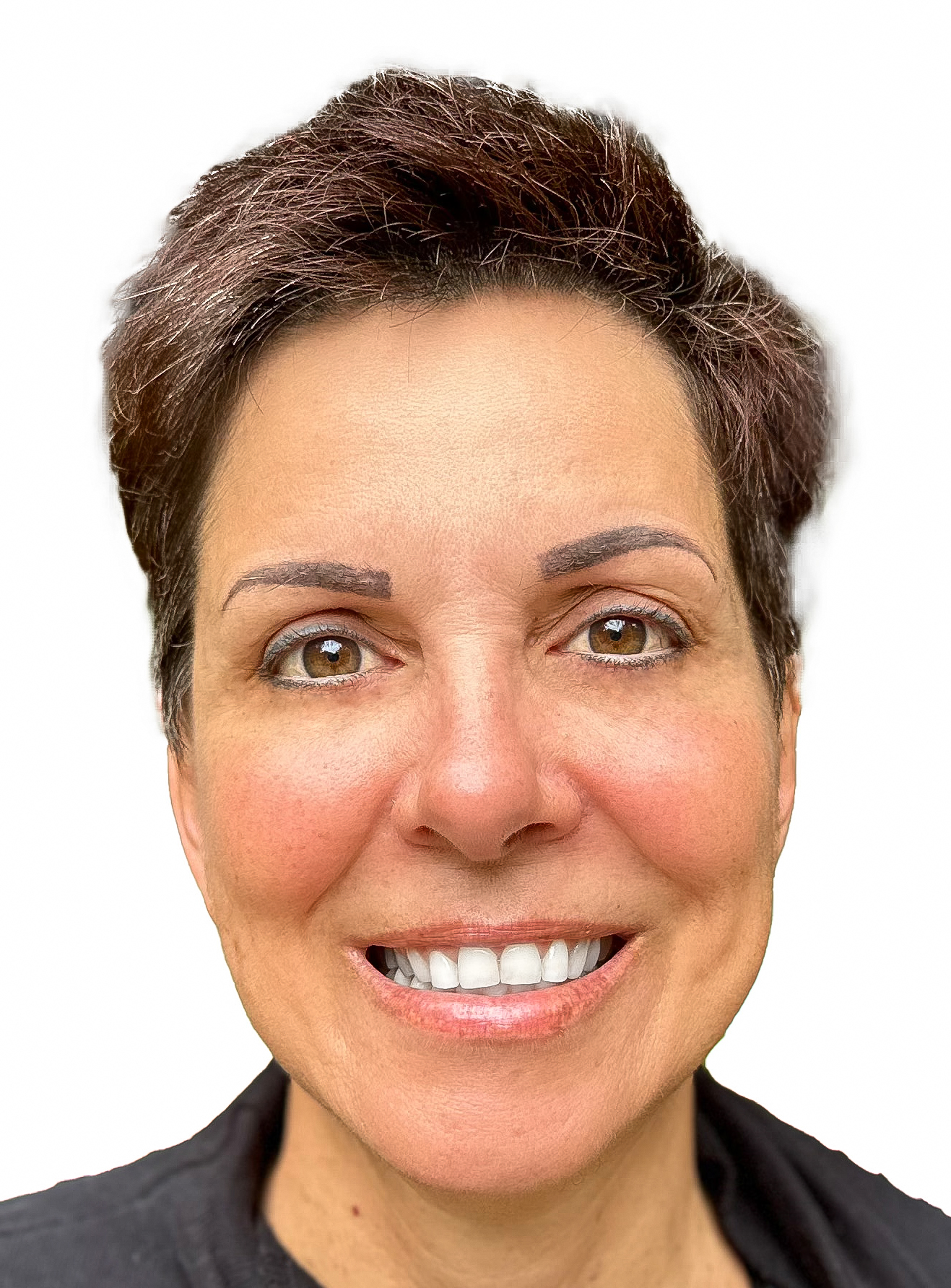
Paula Barrett

Paula Barrett is a clinician, scholar, researcher and professor in the field of child psychology. She has been recognised as being amongst the top 1 percent of publishers within the field of Psychology and Psychiatry at an international level. Barrett is the author of the FRIENDS Programs, cognitive behaviour therapy (CBT) based programs, endorsed by the World Health Organization, as best practice for the prevention and treatment of anxiety and depression, promoting resilience in families, schools and communities. Barrett is the director of Friends Resilience Pty and is adjunct professor in the School of Psychology at Edith Cowan University.

== Education ==
- Doctor of Philosophy (1995), the University of Queensland
- Master of Clinical Psychology (1990), the University of Queensland
- Licenciatura in Clinical Psychology (1986), University of Lisbon
- Bachelor of Science (First Class Honours) (1983), University of Lisbon

== Programs ==
For over two decades, Barrett has continued to develop and evaluate the world-renowned FRIENDS programs:

- Fun Friends
- Friends for Life
- My Friends Youth
- Adult Resilience Program

She has also developed the FOCUS program for working with children with Obsessive Compulsive Disorder, which has demonstrated efficacy for up to 7 years follow-up.

In 2020 and in response to the COVID-19 pandemic, Barrett developed and launched a Family / Community Package, designed to provide coping skills to families during times of adversity. This package has been used globally and receives positive feedback from participants.

== Awards and honours ==
- 2009 Highly Commended Certificate, Human Rights Medal Australian Human Rights Commission
- 2008 Telstra Queensland Business Woman of the Year Telstra
- 2008 Australian of the Year Award, Queensland, Finalist
- 1999 Early Career Award, Australian Psychological Society for outstanding scholarship in Psychology.
- Tracey Goodall Early Career Award, Australian Association of Cognitive Behaviour Therapy
