= Erick Allen =

American politician (born 1975)

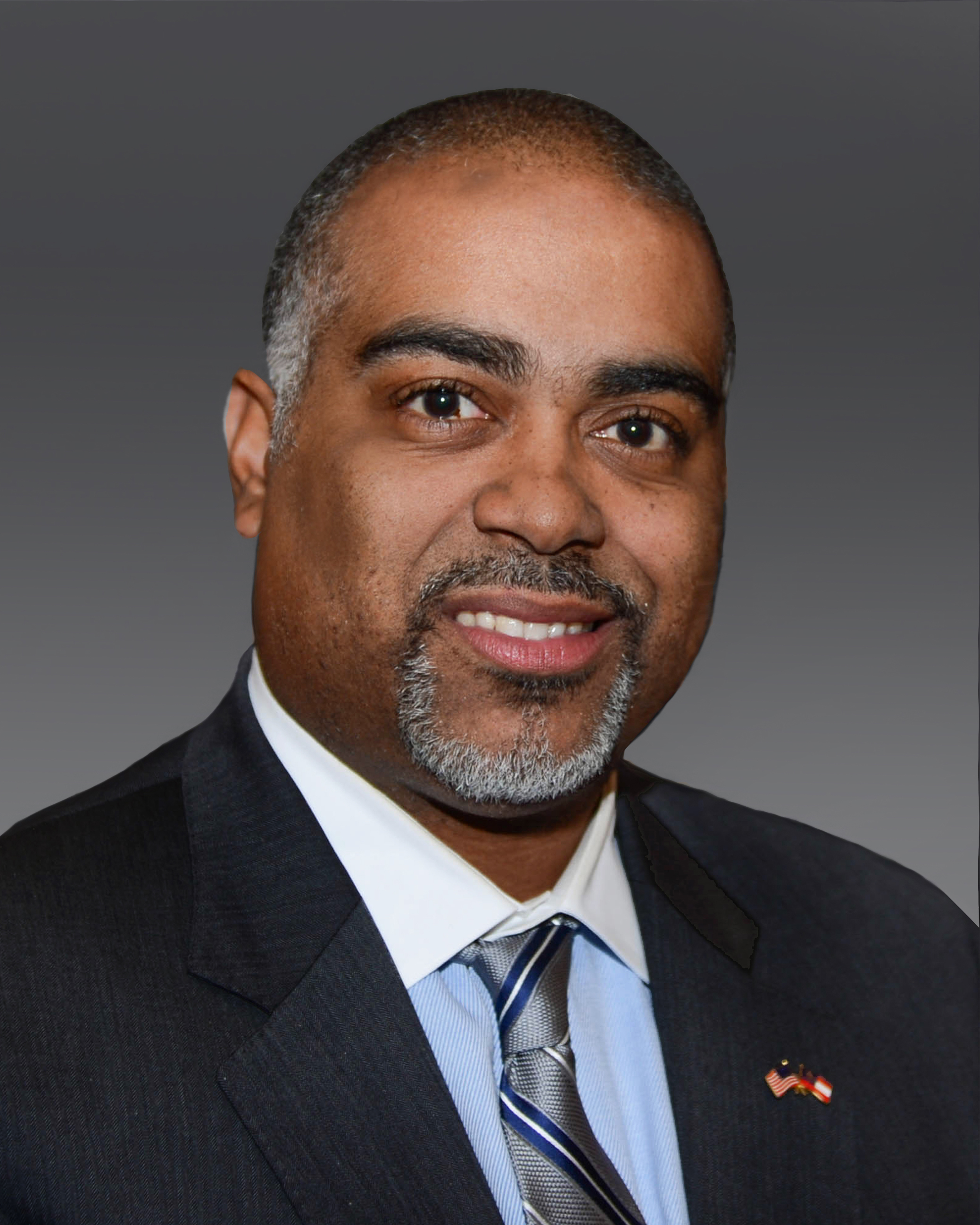

Member of the Georgia House of Representatives from the 40th district
- In office January 14, 2019 – January 9, 2023
- Preceded by: Rich Golick
- Succeeded by: Doug Stoner

Chair of the Cobb County Democratic Committee
- Incumbent
- Assumed office 2022
- State chair: Nikema Williams
- Preceded by: Jacquelyn Bettadapur

Personal details
- Born: Erick Eugene Allen; October 5, 1975 (age 50) Nashville, Tennessee, U.S.
- Party: Democratic
- Occupation: Consultant

Erick Eugene Allen (born October 5, 1975) is an American politician. A member of the Democratic Party, he has served as Cobb County (GA) Commissioner for District 2 since 2025. He represented the 40th district in the Georgia House of Representatives from 2019 to 2023.

== Personal life and education ==
Allen was born in Nashville, Tennessee. After graduating high school at Whites Creek Comprehensive High School Allen received a bachelor's degree in human and organizational development from Belmont University and a master's in business administration from Kennesaw State University.

Allen is married to Dr. Tameka Allen, an Orthodontist, and has one daughter Elise.

== Career ==
Allen started his career in Nashville Tennessee with Central Parking Corporation holding various roles in HR and Organizational Development. Since arriving in Georgia, Allen has worked as a self-employed consultant focusing on workforce performance and organizational development. He also served as Chief Learning Officer for several organizations including CareCentric, Elsevier, and the Georgia Department of Behavioral Health and Developmental Disabilities. From 2016 to 2026 he worked as a Sr. Principal of Thought Leadership for Cornerstone OnDemand. He is currently employed by NEOGOV as a Sales Executive.

=== Georgia House ===
Allen first ran for Georgia House in 2014 against Republican incumbent Rich Golick, and again in 2016 before defeating Golick in 2018.

Rep. Allen was named the 2021 Legislator of the year by the Georgia Mental Health Consumer network for his advocacy and work in Mental Health. in 2019 the Georgia Council on Substance Abuse renamed their advocate of the year award the Erick Allen Advocate of the Year award in recognition of Rep. Allen's work to secure legislation for a specialized Georgia Recovers license plate and for starting the Legislative Working Group on Addiction and Recovery (only the 3rd in the country at the time).

He resigned from the House to run in the Democratic primary for the 2022 Georgia lieutenant gubernatorial election, coming in fifth place to Charlie Bailey. He served as chair of the Chair of the Cobb County Democratic Committee from 2022 to 2024.

=== Cobb County Commission ===
He won a special election for District 2 on the Cobb County Commission in April 2025.

Commissioner Allen made history being the first African American man to be elected to the Cobb County Board of Commissioners.

In 2026 he was appointed Vice Chair.

=== Advocacy ===
Allen was elected to the Georgia Council for Recovery Board of Directors in 2022 and currently serves as the Board Chairman.

Allen was elected in 2023 to serve as Co-Chair for the National Association of State Personnel Executives (Corporate Council). His term expired in 2026.

== Committees ==
In the Georgia House, Allen served as a member on the Banks & Banking, Code Revision, Insurance, Economic Development & Tourism, and Human Relations & Aging committees.

== Previous Endorsements ==
President Barack Obama, President Joe Biden, Vice President Kamala Harris, Governor Roy Barnes, Attorney General Eric Holder, Stacey Abrams, Sierra Club, NARAL, PPSE, Educators First, GA AFL-CIO, Moms Demand Action Gun Sense Candidate

Georgia House of Representatives
Preceded by Rich Golick	Member of the Georgia House of Representatives from the 40th district 2019–2023	Succeeded by Doug Stoner
