= Georgia Land Conservation Program =

The Georgia Land Conservation Program (GLCP) works to permanently protect land and water resources in the U.S. state of Georgia through public/private partnerships. Created in 2005 by former Governor Sonny Perdue through the Georgia Land Conservation Act, the GLCP provides grants, low-interest loans, and tax credits to achieve permanent land conservation through conservation easements and fee simple ownership.

== Conservation objectives ==
Managed by the Georgia Environmental Finance Authority, the GLCP has 10 conservation objectives:

- Water quality protection
- Flood prevention
- Wetlands preservation
- Erosion prevention
- Wildlife habitat maintenance
- Preserving agriculture
- Enhancing historic sites
- Maintaining scenic views
- Recreation provision
- Connecting natural and recreational areas

== Georgia Conservation Tax Credit Program ==
The GLCP also administers the Georgia Conservation Tax Credit Program. The tax credit allows landowners who donate fee-title lands or permanent conservation easements to apply for a credit against their state income taxes. Approved donors may earn credits equal to 25 percent of the fair market value of their donations, up to $250,000 for individual donors, and $500,000 for corporate and partnership donors.

== Land Conservation Council ==
The Land Conservation Council, which governs the GLCP, includes five state agency leaders and four gubernatorial appointments.
