= Georgia Environmental Finance Authority =

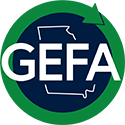

Agency overview
- Formed: 1985; 41 years ago
- Jurisdiction: Georgia
- Headquarters: 47 Trinity Ave SW Fifth Floor Atlanta, Georgia 30334
- Employees: 42
- Agency executive: Hunter Hill, Executive Director
- Website: gefa.georgia.gov

The Georgia Environmental Finance Authority (GEFA) is an agency of the U.S. state of Georgia that directs programs that work to conserve and improve Georgia's energy, land and water resources. GEFA provides loans for water, sewer and solid waste infrastructure; manages energy efficiency and renewable energy programs; oversees land conservation projects; and manages and monitors state-owned fuel storage tanks.

== Organization ==
=== Water Resources Division ===
GEFA provides loans for water, sewer and solid waste infrastructure improvements to local governments. The Water Resources Division also assists local governments with the development of reservoir and water supply projects.

=== Energy Resources Division ===
GEFA's Energy Resources Division promotes energy efficiency, renewable energy and energy assistance programs. These programs include the Weatherization Assistance Program, the State Energy Program and Energy Performance Contracting.

=== Georgia Land Conservation Program ===
The Georgia Land Conservation Program offers grants and low-interest loans for fee title or conservation easement purchases from the Georgia Land Conservation Revolving Fund. It also manages the Georgia Conservation Tax Credit Program, which is designed to increase the financial incentives for a willing landowner to donate land or place a permanent conservation easement on their property.

=== The Fuel Storage Tank Program ===
The Fuel Storage Tank Program is responsible for monitoring, upgrading, replacing or closing underground and aboveground state-owned fuel storage tanks.

=== The Governor's Water Supply Program ===
In January 2011, Governor Nathan Deal directed that GEFA would work with several state agencies and local governments across Georgia to create a water supply development program designed to "align and mobilize state resources to help local governments develop new water supplies," creating the Governor's Water Supply Program. The potential solutions include finding ways to expand existing water reservoirs and explore ways to build new ones.

=== Fiscal Services Division ===
The Fiscal Services Division provides accounting, financial underwriting and loan servicing for GEFA programs. Fiscal Services also ensures compliance with agency, state and federal fiscal policies and procedures. It reviews and recommends loan awards for the Water Resources and Land Resources Divisions, and performs credit analyses; provides reimbursements for loan project expenses; processes loan payments; calculates loan repayment figures and accrued construction-period loan interest; monitors borrowers for proper debt service coverage; and reviews compliance limits for GEFA customers.

The Fiscal Services Division also provides consultations to communities on loan underwriting; prepares and submits financial reports of GEFA's activities to state and federal authorities; processes invoices for GEFA expenses; monitors division accounts; and manages the agency's budget.

== Agency history ==
GEFA, founded in 1985 with a first-year appropriation of $20 million, was created to provide local governments with easy access to inexpensive financing for water and sewer system improvements. To date, GEFA has provided more than $3 billion in low-interest loans to cities, counties and infrastructure authorities for improvements to water, sewer and solid waste systems. More than 1,500 projects have been funded by GEFA, including solid waste management projects and land conservation purchases and easements.

In 1994, the State Energy Office was attached to GEFA and renamed the Division of Energy Resources.

GEFA added the Fuel Storage Tank Program in 1995, which is responsible for upgrading, replacing, or closing all state-owned fuel storage tanks.

In 2006, GEFA added the Georgia Land Conservation Program, which it administers under the guidance of the Land Conservation Council. The Land Conservation Council authorizes both grant and loan funding to promote land conservation.

In addition to new programs and initiatives, GEFA has also increased the scope of its responsibility. In 2010, Gov. Nathan Deal signed SB194, companion legislation to Senate Resolution 1231. SB194 is a constitutional amendment allowing state agencies to finance a multi-year energy savings performance contract, and designates GEFA as the lead agency for facilitating the program. Georgians voted on the constitutional amendment on November 2, 2010, it passed and the amendment was made effective January 1, 2011. GEFA now helps state agencies use energy more economically and efficiently through energy savings performance contracting.

In July 2010, GEFA changed its name to the Georgia Environmental Finance Authority to better reflect its investment in energy, land and water resources. GEFA proposed the name change to mark the continued growth of the organization and help clarify its responsibilities.

== See also ==
- Georgia Energy Challenge
- Georgia Land Conservation Program
- Georgia Department of Natural Resources
- Georgia Department of Community Affairs
- Georgia Department of Economic Development
- Georgia Governor Nathan Deal
- State of Georgia Official Website
- Georgia General Assembly
- U.S. Environmental Protection Agency
- U.S. Department of Energy
- Energy Star
