= Philip C. Kendall =

American psychologist (born 1950)

- Born: March 2, 1950 (age 76); Merrick, New York
- Education: Chaminade High School Old Dominion University, B.A. Virginia Commonwealth University, Ph.D.
- Known for: His research on childhood and adolescent anxiety treatment Coping Cat
- Scientific career
- Fields: Clinical Psychology
- Workplaces: Temple University
- Website: childanxiety.org

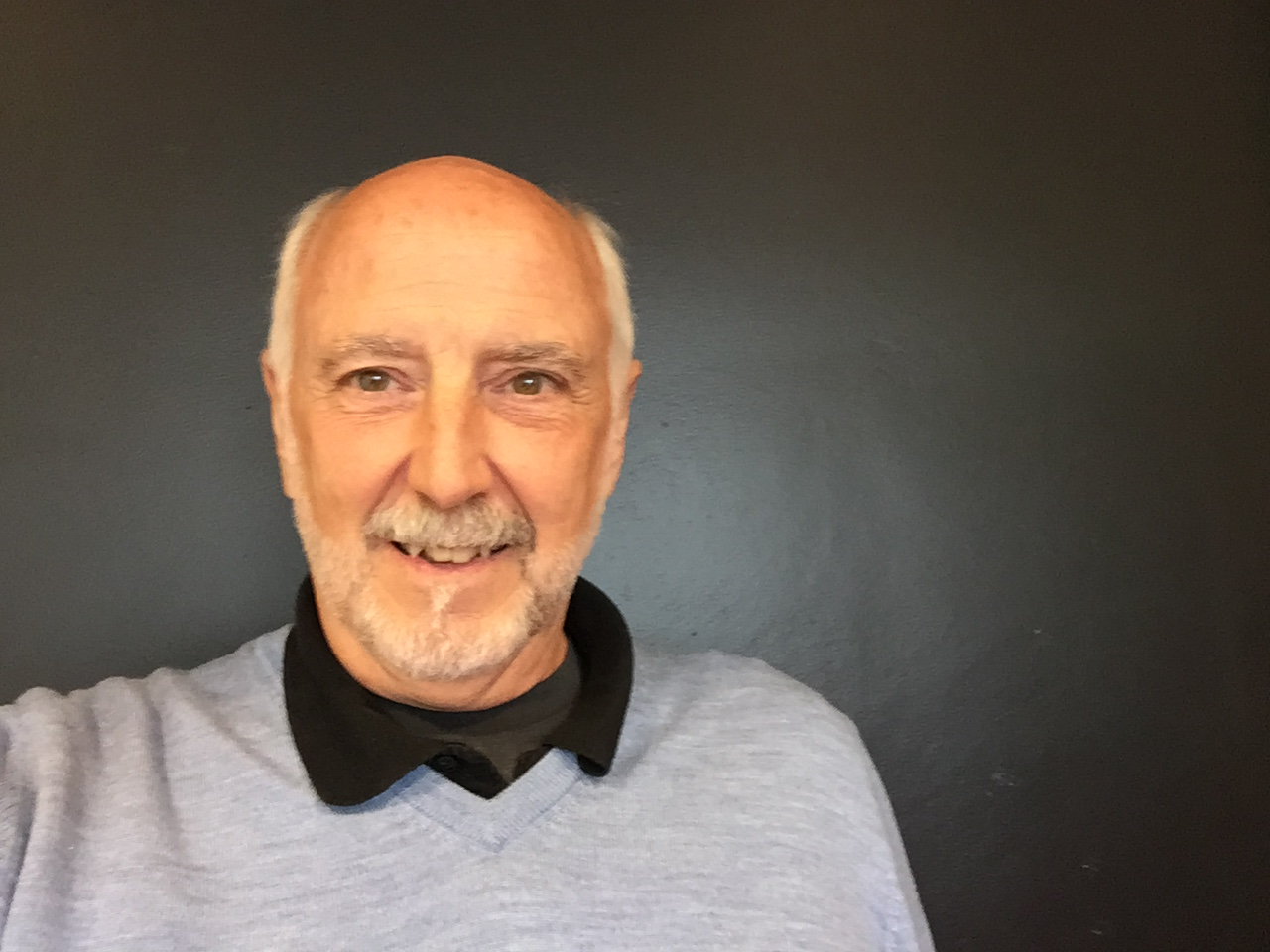
An image of Philip C. Kendall in 2025.

Philip C. Kendall (born March 2, 1950) is distinguished university professor and Laura H. Carnell Professor of Psychology, director of the Child and Adolescent Anxiety Disorders Clinic at Temple University, and clinical child and adolescent psychologist. Alongside contemporaries at Temple University, Kendall produced the Coping Cat program. Coping Cat is an evidence-based and empirically supported treatment for anxiety in youth.

== Early life and education ==
Kendall is from Merrick, New York. Following his graduation from Chaminade High School. he went to Old Dominion University, where he received his bachelor's degree in 1972. A few years later, Kendall graduated from Virginia Commonwealth University in 1977 with a clinical psychology doctorate.

== Professional roles and awards ==
During his University of Minnesota tenure, Kendall was promoted to full professor and appointed the title of director of clinical training. Afterward, Kendall entered Temple University as faculty, where he has spent the rest of his academic career. He's been the president of the Society of Clinical Child and Adolescent Psychology (Division 53) of APA in addition to being president of the Association for the Advancement of Behavior Therapy(AABT, now ABCT). Kendall also served as the honorary visiting expert in psychiatry at the Ministry of Health in Singapore, distinguished visiting professor at Lackland Air Force Base at Wilford Hall Medical Center in San Antonio, Texas, visiting professor at the Universidad Peruana in Lima, Peru, Arthur B. Richard Visiting Professor in Child Psychiatry at Indiana University School of Medicine, and guest lecturer at the Institute for Studies in Learning Disabilities at the University of Waterloo. Kendall was also a fellow at the Center for Advanced Study in the Behavioral Sciences at Stanford. In addition, Kendall is currently the Laura H. Carnell Professor of Psychology and Neuroscience at Temple University.

Kendall received Philadelphia Magazine's "Best Therapist" award for the tri-state area in 1997. In 2016, Kendall also received the Aaron T. Beck award for Significant and Enduring Contributions to Cognitive Therapy. Similarly, in 2025 he was awarded the American Psychological Association Award for Distinguished Scientific Applications of Psychology Likewise, he received the "Great Teacher" award from Temple University and has had over 35 years of continued grant support from agencies such as the National Institute of Mental Health, the MacArthur Foundation, and the National Institute of Child Health and Human Development. Moreover, Kendall received the Association for Behavioral and Cognitive Therapies' (ABCT) 2019 Career/Lifetime Achievement Award, and in 2009 won ABCTs award for "Outstanding Contribution by an Individual for Educational / Training Activities." He was similarly recognized by the Anxiety Disorders Association of America (now Anxiety & Depression Association of America ADAA) for his contributions to research on child and adolescent anxiety disorders with their inaugural Research Recognition Award in 2005.

== Impact ==
Kendall has an H-index of 161. In 2006, Kendall ranked 5th for the number of publications and citations among all members of APA-approved programs. Similarly, Kendall has been an author on over 800 scholarly publications as well as over 20 treatment manuals and workbooks.

Kendall designed the Coping Cat program, a set of treatment courses for children and adolescents who suffer from anxiety disorders. His treatment courses have been recognized as being supported in empirical ways being implemented more than 15 countries. Similarly, in collaboration with the clinical psychologist Muniya Khanna, Kendall developed the empirically supported online cognitive-behavioral therapy program for children, Child Anxiety Tales. Also, Kendall has collaborated with pioneers in clinical psychology, such as Albert Ellis.

Further, Kendall has also directly trained over 150 doctoral students, chaired, or participated on roughly 200 dissertation defense committees, and directly mentors postdoctoral research fellows and has taught undergraduate students.
