= Human development =

Human development may refer to:

- Development of the human body
  - This includes physical developments such as growth, and also development of the brain
- Developmental psychology
- Development theory
- Human development (economics)
- Human Development Index, an index used to rank countries by level of human development
- Human evolution, the prehistoric process leading to the modern human species
- Human Development (journal), a journal published by Karger

== See also ==
- Human population growth
