= Coping Cat =

Cognitive behavioral therapy

The Coping Cat program is a CBT manual-based and comprehensive treatment program for children from 7 to 13 years old with separation anxiety disorder, social anxiety disorder, generalized anxiety disorder, and/or related anxiety disorders. It was designed by Philip C. Kendall, PhD, ABPP, and colleagues at the Child and Adolescent Anxiety Disorders Clinic at Temple University. A related program called C.A.T. Project is aimed at adolescents aged 14 to 17.

The goals of the treatment are three-fold:

- the child learns to recognize, experience, and cope with anxiety
- the child learns to manage their level of anxiety
- the child learns to master developmentally appropriate, challenging, and difficult tasks

== Application ==
In 16 individual therapy program is divided into two parts: The first eight sessions are the training segment, and the second eight sessions are the practice (exposure tasks) segment. Sessions last approximately 50 minutes. In addition, two sessions between the therapist and the parent(s)/guardian(s) are scheduled at session 4 and session 9. While the therapist follows a treatment manual, the youth uses the Coping cat workbook to guide completion of the exercises and to aid involvement and skill acquisition.

The therapist and youth together create a personalized FEAR plan for the youth to use in anxiety-provoking situations. FEAR stands for Feeling frightened?; Expecting bad things to happen?; Actions and attitudes that can help?; Results and rewards.

Youth are also given homework, referred to as a STIC (Show That I Can) task.

== Evidence ==
Coping Cat is a "well supported" intervention for treating separation anxiety disorder, social anxiety disorder, and generalized anxiety disorder. Based on the numerous rigorous research evaluations, the program has met the criteria for an "empirically supported treatment". The program has been evaluated in several randomized clinical trials with one-year follow-up data conducted both in the United States, Norway, and in Australia. The outcomes have been very favorable, with 3.35 year-follow-up of one study and 7.4 year follow-up of the second study providing evidence of the maintenance gains. One trial comparing the effects of Coping Cat, sertraline, and their combination, demonstrated that youths who received the combination of Coping Cat and medication received the most benefits, and both Coping Cat and sertraline alone resulted in significant improvements that were also greater than a pill placebo. Coping Cat has also been found to be effective in treating children with anxiety with high-function autism spectrum disorder.

== Versions ==
- Adolescents: The C.A.T. Project is a version of Coping Catin a format and with language that is designed for adolescents aged 14 to 17.
- Group: A group version of Coping Cathas also been designed to work with 4 to 5 children together.
- Cognitive-Behavioral Family Therapy for Anxious Children
- Prevention: The prevention program based on Coping catis called EMOTION. It is designed for youth and their parents and targets both anxiety and depression. The program reduced the likelihood of children developing an anxiety disorder 6 months post-treatment.
- Other languages: The Coping Cat has been translated into Spanish, Chinese, Hungarian, Japanese, and Norwegian.
- Computer assisted: Camp Cope-A-Lotis an online computer-based program based on Coping Catdeveloped by the authors of the Coping Catprogram. Camp Cope-A-Lotis designed to be used by school and mental health professionals working with children 7-13 struggling with anxiety. Camp Cope-A-Lothas been evaluated as a 12-week computer-assisted treatment, with 6 computer-guided and 6 therapist-guided sessions
- Parent Training: The Child Anxiety Tales program is an online parent-training program based on the cognitive-behavioral principles from the Coping Cat. Child Anxiety Tales can be found at http://www.copingcatparents.com/Child_Anxiety_Tales

== See also ==
- Generalized anxiety disorder
