= Ten Thirteen =

Ten Thirteen may refer to:

- Ten Thirteen Productions, a production company founded by Chris Carter in 1993
- 10/13, in television series production, is shorthand for a role that means that although that character usually is a series regular they are only guaranteed to be in 10 out of 13 episodes.
