= Hipster sexism =

Form of self-aware sexism

Hipster sexism, also known as everyday sexism, or ironic sexism, is defined by Alissa Quart in New York magazine's fashion blog The Cut as "the objectification of women but in a manner that uses mockery, quotation marks, and paradox". It is a form of self-aware sexism that is deemed acceptable given that its perpetrators are conscious of the inherent sexism and objectification of women in whatever action or statement is being carried out by them. It is rooted in the idea that sexism is an outdated and archaic institution which people do not engage in anymore, thereby making the demonstration of sexism seem satirical and ironic.

Hipster sexism may be presented with derision and expressed as harmless. Quart posits that hipster sexism "is a distancing gesture, a belief that simply by applying quotations, uncool, questionable, and even offensive material about women can be alchemically transformed". She notes this form of sexism as having a particular public admissibility, saying that it perpetuates sexism in general due to a public tolerance based upon reasoning that instances of hipster sexism are humorous. Distinguishing socially critiquing comedy from hipster sexism, feminist discourse discusses hipster sexism as humor which, rather than offering critique, employs an evasive methodology which maintains stereotypes and prejudice. Psychology professor Octavia Calder-Dawe suggests that due to this, the practice of hipster sexism also unconsciously influences the idea that sexism should not be spoken of. Hipster sexism relates to postfeminism in that it downplays sexism at large by casually normalizing it on the basis that sexism has been eradicated and thus is not appropriate for serious consideration or discussion.

A tenet of hipster sexism is the casual use of derogatory words such as "bitch" and "slut", on the basis that such use is intended as ironic. Jessica Wakeman, a contributor to The Frisky, suggests that the label hipster sexism enables casual sexism as a means of being ironic, and thus being seen as an acceptable form of sexism.

Quart coined the term "hipster sexism" in 2012, partly as a comment on "hipster racism", a term coined by Carmen Van Kerckhove circa 2007 which had been popularized earlier in 2012. She differentiated it from "classic sexism", which she describes as being "un-ironic, explicit, violent [and] banal".

== See also ==
- Hipster racism
- Irony poisoning
- Million Dollar Extreme – American comedy group
