= Grunge speak =

Hoaxes of words used in the grunge subculture

Grunge speak was a hoax series of slang words purportedly connected to the subculture of grunge in Seattle, reported as fact in The New York Times in 1992. The collection of alleged slang words were coined by a record label worker in response to a journalist asking if grunge musicians and enthusiasts had their own slang terms, seeking to write a piece on the subject. They were essentially made up on the spot; there was no such vernacular among members of the grunge scene, and the terms that were published were merely a prank on the news industry's tendencies to seize upon trends.

== History ==
The words later labelled "grunge speak" were coined by Megan Jasper, then aged 25 and working for Caroline Records. She had previously worked for Sub Pop Records, whose co-founder Jonathan Poneman referred journalists to her, ostensibly for her inside knowledge of grunge, but also because of her prankish streak. She was telephoned first by UK magazine SKY and later by Rick Marin for The New York Times. Poneman forewarned Jasper that Marin was seeking "a lexicon of grunge"; Jasper recalled Marin explaining, "Every subculture has a different way of speaking and there's got to be words and phrases and things that you folks say." Jasper tested her interviewers' gullibility by supplying invented slang expressions of increasing ridiculousness.

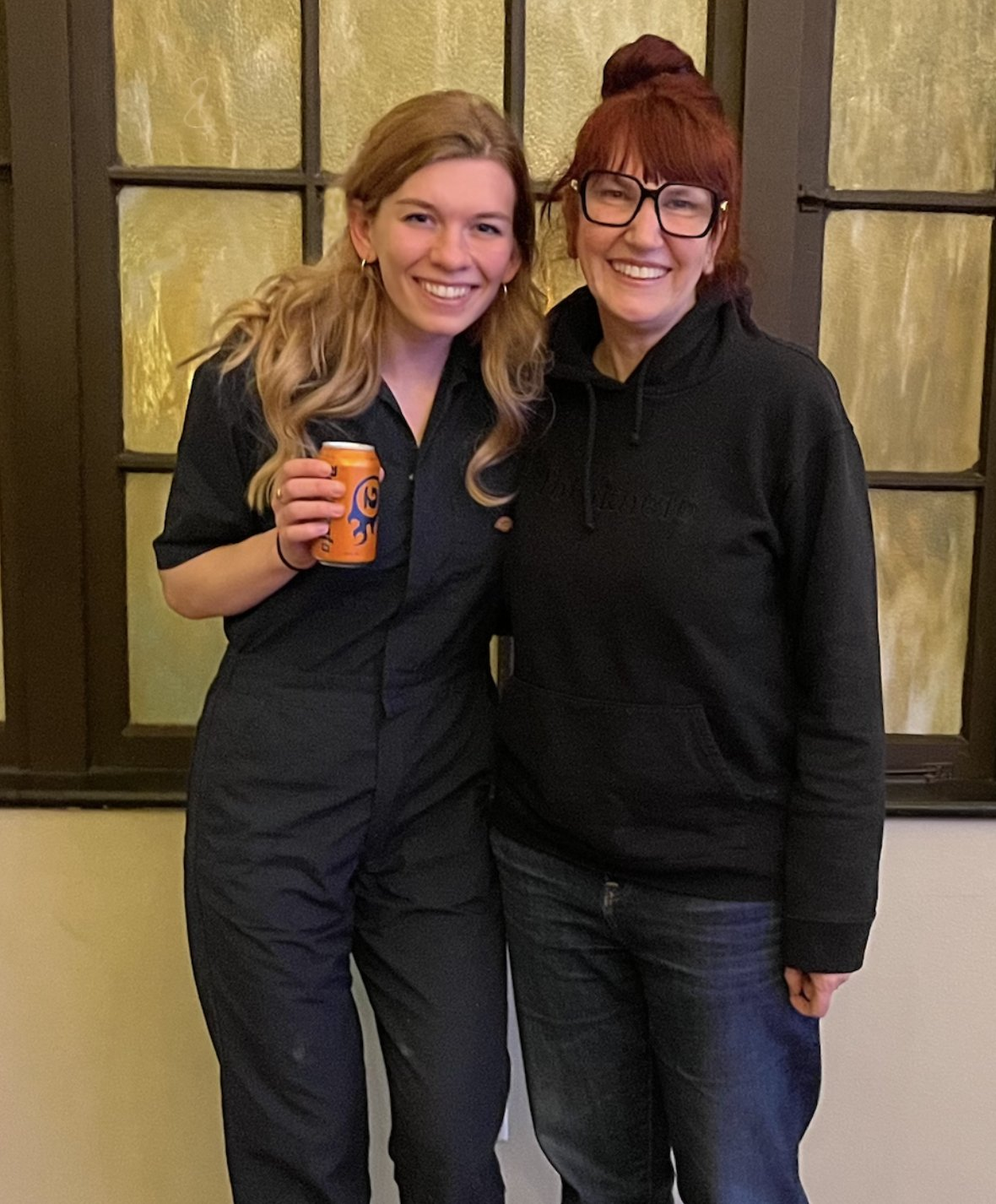
Megan Jasper (right) with Annie Rauwerda at a Depths of Wikipedia show in 2023

A coverline on the September 1992 issue of SKY said "like, harsh realm, man — How to hang out in Seattle", trailing a four-page article which mentioned some of Jasper's expressions. Seattle band Mudhoney saw the article while on tour in the UK and joined in the joke by reusing some terms in an interview with Melody Maker. Marin's article, "Grunge: A Success Story", appeared in The New York Times on November 15, 1992, as a full-page story in its Sunday "Styles" section. The article begins with an investigation on the origin of the term "grunge" and concludes with a summary of grunge music and fashion. Jasper's invented terms were published as a sidebar to Marin's story, titled "Lexicon of Grunge: Breaking the Code" and crediting Jasper for "this lexicon of grunge-speak". The list was reprinted by the Ottawa Citizen in December.

Thomas Frank was skeptical of the Times' lexicon, and contacted Jasper, who "readily admitted" the fabrication, as Frank reported in the Winter–Spring 1993 issue of The Baffler. The Baffler story was picked up by news media, including Calvin Trillin's syndicated column. When the Times got back to Jasper, she initially denied Frank's claims, so the Times demanded an apology from Frank. Instead, he sent a letter standing by the story: "When The Newspaper of Record goes searching for the Next Big Thing and the Next Big Thing piddles on its leg, we think that's funny." He considered the article to be part of an attempt by mainstream culture to co-opt the grunge scene and felt that the Times had gotten what it deserved. Jasper later ascribed her initial denial to a fear that Marin or "Styles" editor Penelope Green would be fired. Green commented to the New York Observer, "Our piece was tongue-in-cheek, so I guess [the hoax] works. But how irritating." She prepared a correction but the Times never published it.

== Grunge speak words ==
The following were in the Times lexicon:

- bloated, big bag of bloatation – drunk
- bound-and-hagged – staying home on Friday or Saturday night
- cob nobbler – loser
- dish – desirable guy
- fuzz – heavy wool sweaters
- harsh realm – bummer
- kickers – heavy boots
- lamestain – uncool person
- plats – platform shoes
- rock on – a happy goodbye
- score – great
- swingin' on the flippity-flop – hanging out
- tom-tom club – uncool outsiders
- wack slacks – old ripped jeans

Jasper had also offered tuna platter ("a hot date"), and regretted that it had not appeared in the article.

== Legacy ==
Daniel House, the head of C/Z Records, commissioned Art Chantry to design a lexicon T-shirt after people started wearing the sidebar from the article pinned to their shirts at grunge shows. Chantry's design featured "Lamestain" or "Harsh Realm" on the front, with an enlarged copy of the lexicon sidebar on the back.

Harsh Realm was a 1994 comic book series by James D. Hudnall and Andrew Paquette, set in a future of multiple virtual realities, one of which was a dystopia called "Harsh Realm". In 1999 Chris Carter adapted the Harsh Realm comics into a television series of the same name.

In Adam Warren's comic The Dirty Pair, the characters' futuristic slang includes "harsh realm" in the grunge-speak sense.

Bass guitarist Dave Brockie's stage persona in the band X-Cops was "Ex-Patrolman Cobb Knobbler".

The 1996 documentary Hype! included Jasper's prank in its exploration of the early 1990s grunge scene.

The unrelated band Tom Tom Club started before the lexicon was invented.

== See also ==
- The Hipster Handbook, 2003 satirical guide to hipster culture
- Valspeak

== Sources ==
- Marin, Rick (November 15, 1992). "Grunge: A Success Story". The New York Times. Section 9, p. 9.
