= Hipster (contemporary subculture) =

Subculture defined by claims to authenticity and uniqueness

- Years active: 1990s–present
- Country: United States: Brooklyn & Manhattan, New York City (origins); Other (mostly East and West coastal) areas of North America; Other western countries
- Influences: Various including: young urbanite millennial bohemians and the alt & indie music scenes
- Influenced: Various including: Alt-right nipsters, indie sleaze and normcore trends and other modern subcultures and some aspects of mainstream pop culture

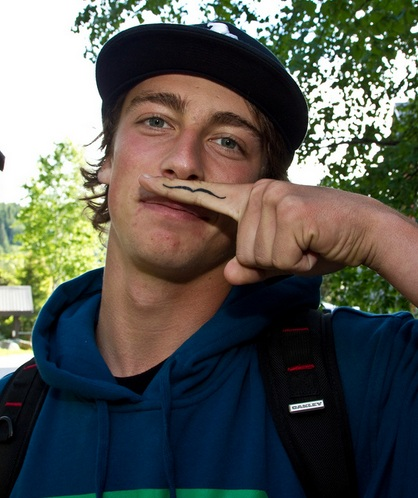
Ironic (or post-ironic) usage of vintage elements is popular in hipster fashion. Ironic moustaches and moustache tattoos were also popular.

The 21st-century hipster is a subculture (sometimes called hipsterism) typically associated with urban millennials. The subculture is characterized by alternative fashion, lifestyle, and music. Hipster values are defined by claims to authenticity and uniqueness, but tend to lack authenticity and conform to a collective style. The subculture embodies a particular ethic of consumption that seeks to commodify the idea of rebellion or counterculture. Members of the subculture typically do not self-identify as hipsters, and the word hipster is often used as a pejorative for someone who is pretentious or overly concerned with appearing trendy.

The subculture is often associated with indie and alternative music. In the United States and Canada, it is mostly associated with perceived upper-middle-class white young adults who gentrify urban areas.

The term hipster in its present usage first appeared in the 1990s and became widely used in the late 2000s and early 2010s, being derived from the earlier hipster movements of the 1940s. Hipster culture became a "global phenomenon" during the early-mid 2010s, before declining from the mainstream by 2016–2017.

== History ==
Mark Greif dates the initial phase of the revival of the term hipster to refer to this subculture from 1999 to 2003. In early 2000, both The New York Times and Time Out New York (TONY) ran profiles of Williamsburg, Brooklyn, referring to "bohemians" and "arty East Village types", respectively. By 2003, when The Hipster Handbook was published by Williamsburg resident Robert Lanham, the term hipster (originally referring to the 1940s subculture) had come into widespread use in relation to Williamsburg and similar neighborhoods. The Hipster Handbook described hipsters as young people with "mop-top haircuts, swinging retro pocketbooks, talking on cell phones, smoking European cigarettes... strutting in platform shoes with a biography of Che Guevara sticking out of their bags." Lanham further describes hipsters: "You graduated from a liberal arts school whose football team hasn't won a game since the Reagan administration[,]" and "you have one Republican friend who you always describe as being your 'one Republican friend.'"

While hipsters usually come from affluent white families, they can come from a multitude of backgrounds. A running theme of hipsters, according to Greif, is having parents who are supporters of former President Ronald Reagan.

A similar phenomenon occurred in the United Kingdom, with young, comparatively affluent workers in the media and digital industries moving into traditionally working class areas of London such as Hoxton, Spitalfields, and, particularly, Shoreditch with the subsequent gentrification of these areas. The subculture was parodied in the magazine Shoreditch Twat (1999) and the television sitcom Nathan Barley (2005). The series led to the term Nathan Barleys being used pejoratively in London for the subculture it parodied.

In 2008, the Utne Reader writer Jake Mohan described "hipster rap" as "consisting of the most recent crop of MCs and DJs who flout conventional hip-hop fashions, eschewing baggy clothes and gold chains for tight jeans, big sunglasses, the occasional keffiyeh, and other trappings of the hipster lifestyle." He notes that the "old-school hip-hop website Unkut, and Jersey City rapper Mazzi" have criticized mainstream rappers whom they deem to be posers "for copping the metrosexual appearances of hipster fashion." Prefix Mag writer Ethan Stanislawski argues that there are racial elements to the rise of hipster rap. He claims that there "have been a slew of angry retorts to the rise of hipster rap," which he says can be summed up as "white kids want the funky otherness of hip-hop...without all the scary black people."

A 2009 Time magazine article described hipsters as follows: "take your grandmother's sweater and Bob Dylan's Wayfarers, add jean shorts, Converse All-Stars and a can of Pabst and bam — hipster."

Hipsters are the friends who sneer when you cop to liking Coldplay. They're the people who wear t-shirts silk-screened with quotes from movies you've never heard of and the only ones in America who still think Pabst Blue Ribbon is a good beer. They sport cowboy hats and berets and think Kanye West stole their sunglasses. Everything about them is exactingly constructed to give off the vibe that they just don't care.

— Time, July 2009.

Slate writer Brandon Stosuy noted that "Heavy metal has recently conquered a new frontier, making an unexpected crossover into the realm of hipsterdom." He argues that the "current revival seems to be a natural mutation from the hipster fascination with post-punk, noise, and no wave," which allowed even the "nerdiest indie kids to dip their toes into jagged, autistic sounds." He argues that a "byproduct" of this development was an "investigation of a musical culture that many had previously feared or fetishized from afar."

In his 2011 book HipsterMattic, author Matt Granfield described hipster culture:

While mainstream society of the 2000s (decade) had been busying itself with reality television, dance music, and locating the whereabouts of Britney Spears's underpants, an uprising was quietly and conscientiously taking place behind the scenes. Long-forgotten styles of clothing, beer, cigarettes and music were becoming popular again. Retro was cool, the environment was precious, and old was the new 'new'. Kids wanted to wear Sylvia Plath's cardigans and Buddy Holly's glasses—they revelled in the irony of making something so nerdy so cool. They wanted to live sustainably and eat organic gluten-free grains. Above all, they wanted to be recognised for being different—to diverge from the mainstream and carve a cultural niche all for themselves. For this new generation, style wasn't something you could buy in a department store, it became something you found in a thrift shop, or, ideally, made yourself. The way to be cool wasn't to look like a television star: it was to look like as though you'd never seen television.

== Fashion ==
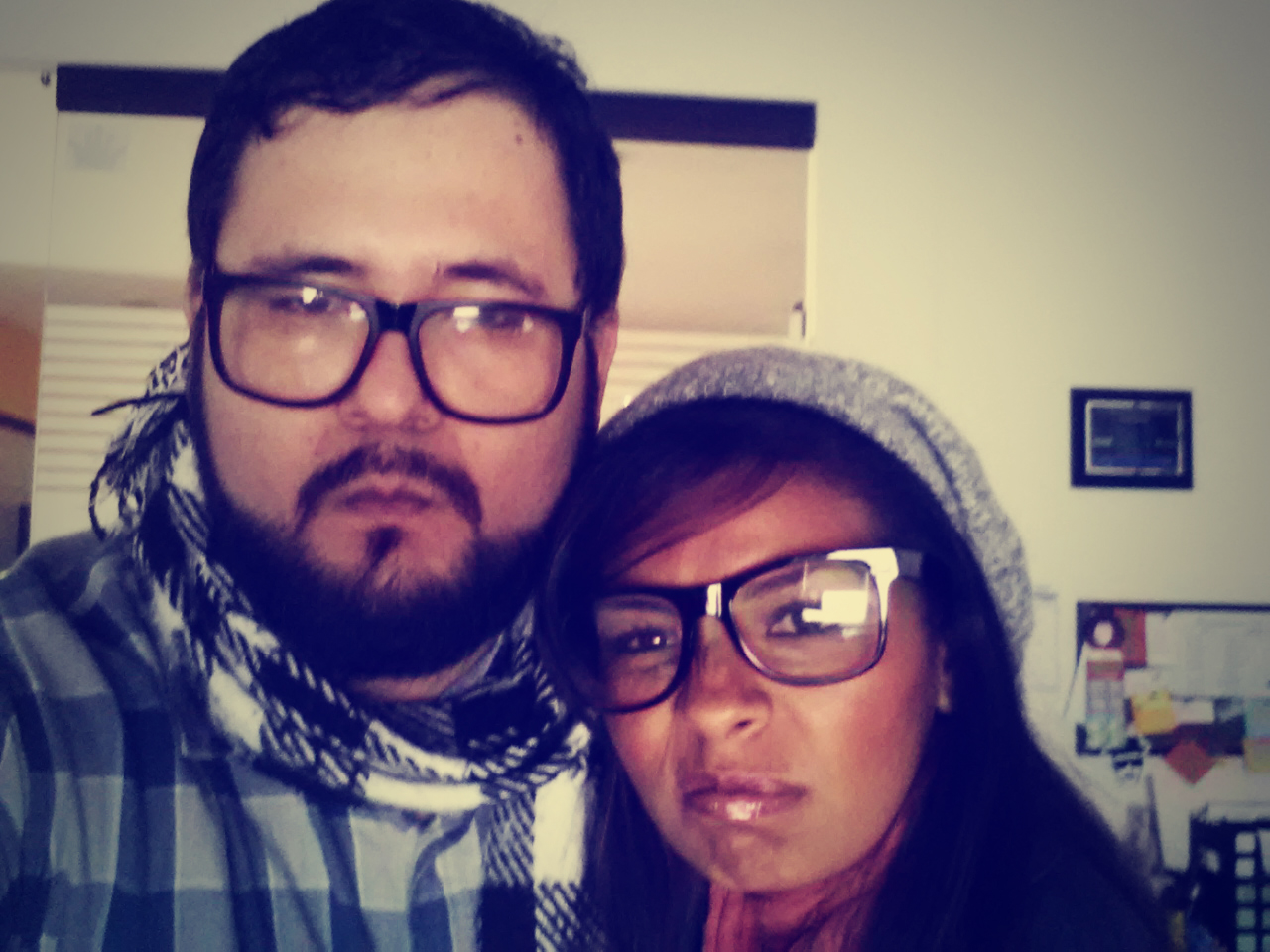
Plaid shirts, decorative pashminas or scarfs, horn-rimmed glasses and beards are associated with the stereotypical 21st-century hipster.

Stereotypical fashion elements include vintage clothes, alternative fashion, or a mixture of different fashions, often including skinny jeans, checked shirts, knit beanies, a full beard or deliberately attention-grabbing moustache, and thick-rimmed or lensless glasses.

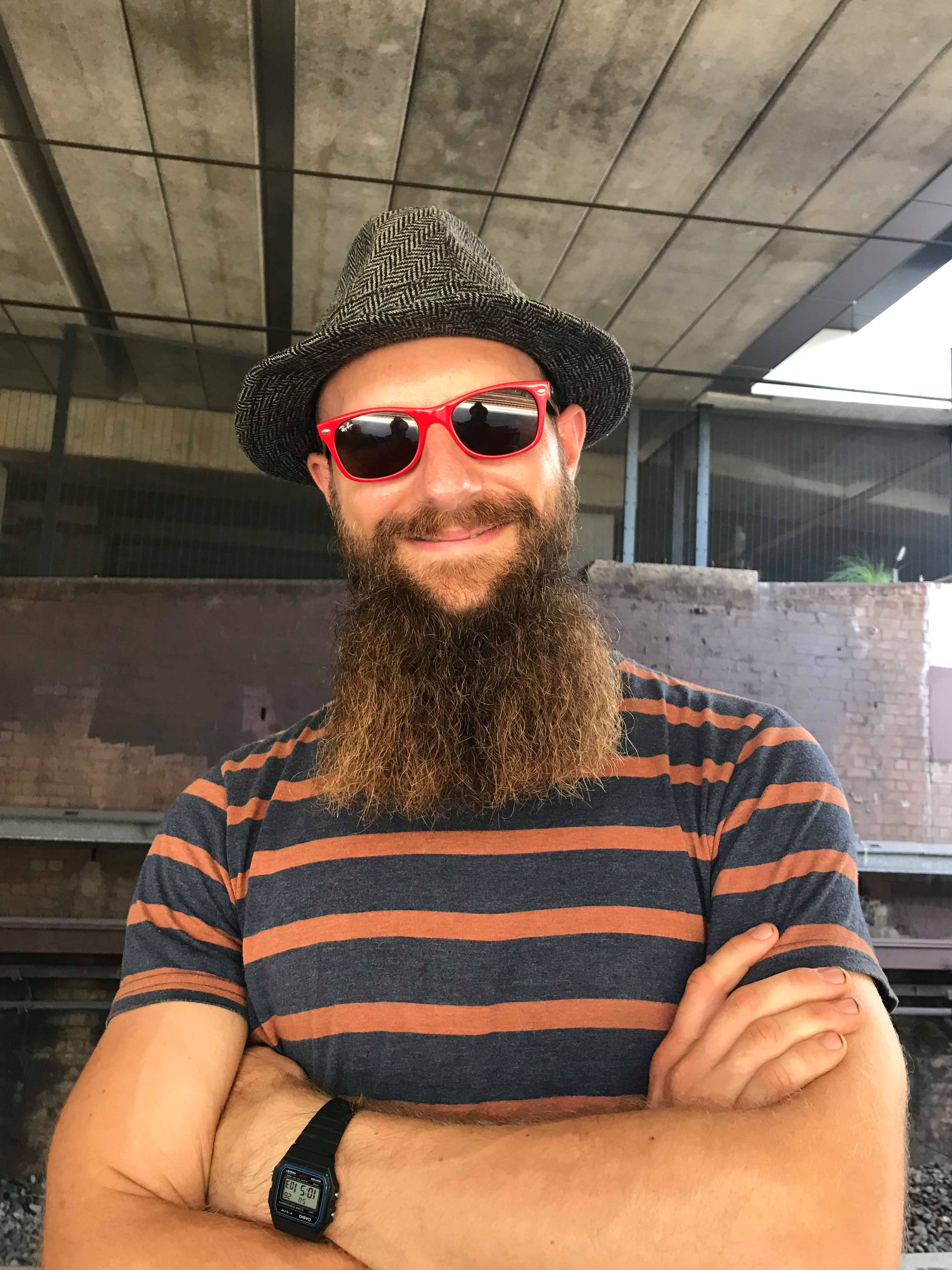
Full beards, vintage clothes, and retro electronics, such as the Casio F-91W watch pictured, are associated with hipster subculture.

Fixed-gear bicycles are associated with the hipster subculture. Slate calls the bikes an "increasingly common hipster accessory." An association of hipsters with an increasing popularity of full beards dates from before 2010. In 2016, historian Alun Withey remarked that "The hipster beard, or lumberjack beard, is going to be the defining facial hair of this generation." The undercut hairstyle also became popular among hipsters in the 2010s. Other hipster trends in the 2010s have included knitting, photography, horticulture, urban beekeeping, specialty coffee, craft beer, taxidermy, fedoras, and printing and bookbinding classes.

== By region ==
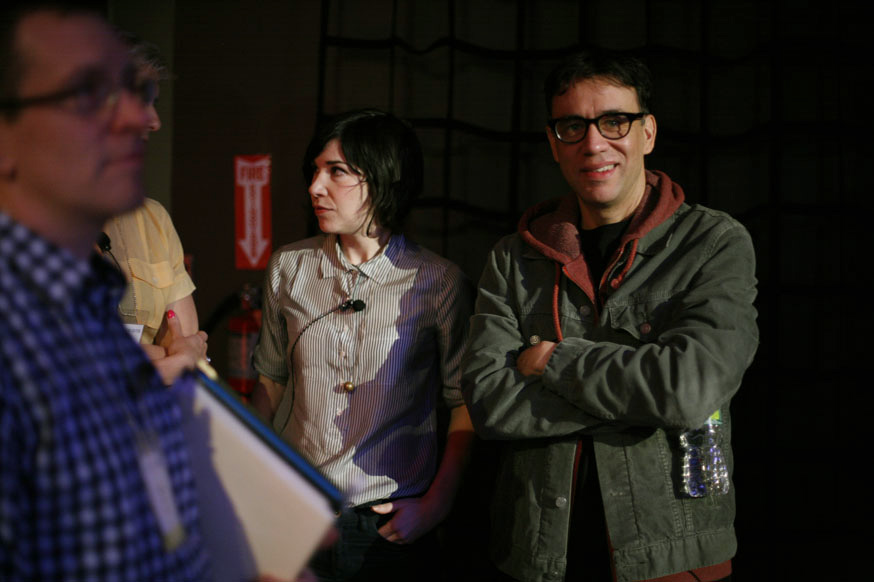
Fred Armisen and Pacific northwest native Carrie Brownstein parody American hipsters on Portlandia.

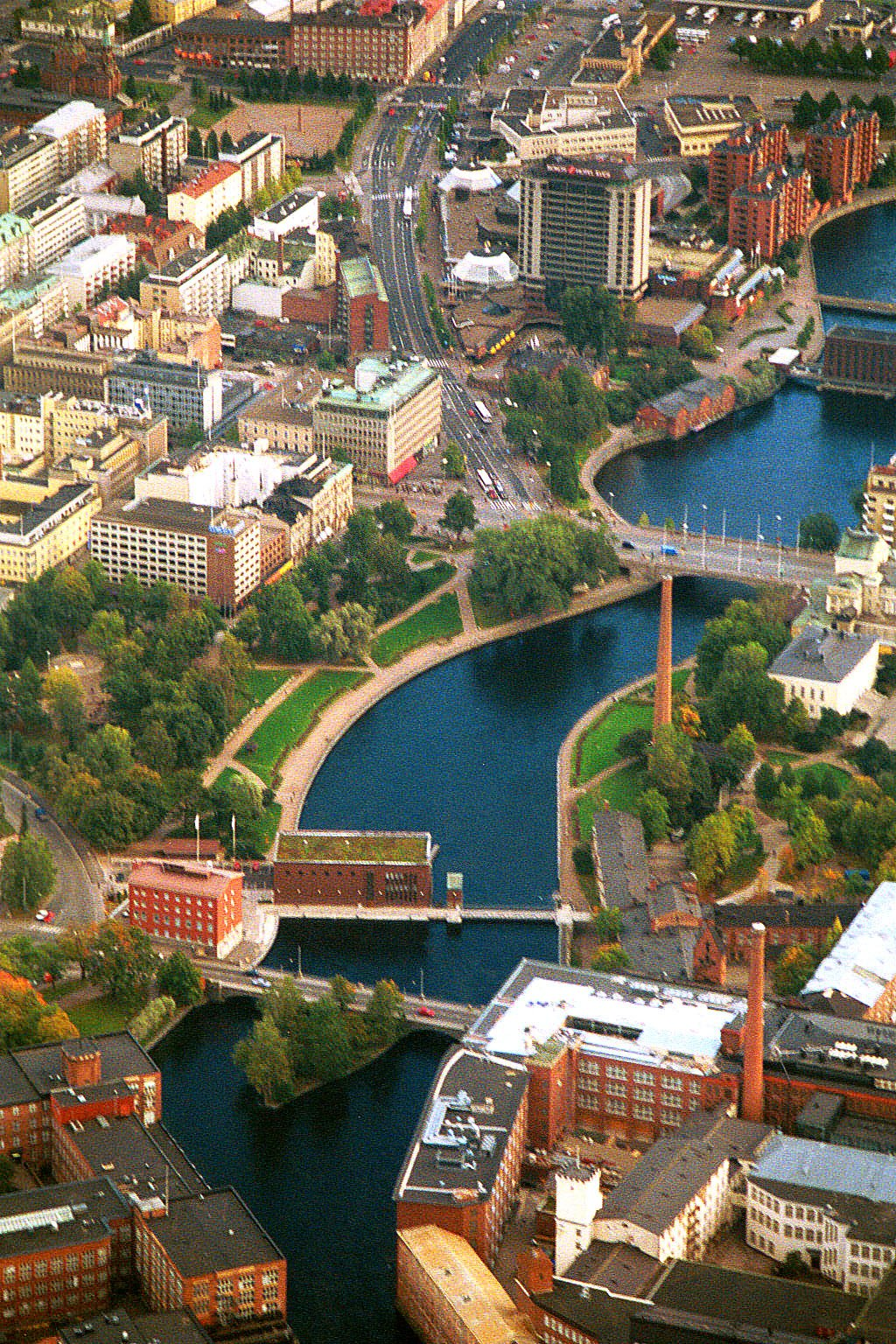
Tampere in Pirkanmaa, Finland is popular with hipsters.

In 2017, the British logistics and marketing firm MoveHub published a "Hipster Index" for the United States. This first study drew from five data points: microbreweries, thrift stores, vegan restaurants and tattoo parlors, and they compounded this data with cities' rent inflation in the previous year. In the following year, MoveHub came out with a similar study, this time measuring the most Hipster cities in the world. The metrics were slightly different for this study: they measured vegan eateries, coffee shops, tattoo studios, vintage boutiques, and record stores. For the global study, they also limited their search to larger cities, with populations above 150,000 residents. For this reason, many American cities which ranked highly on the U.S. study in 2017 were not eligible for the 2018 study. iHeartRadio, a media and entertainment company, then took MoveHub's 2018 study, and narrowed it down to the Canadian cities. All three of these tables are referenced in the following sections about regions which have large hipster cultures. Top of the world list is the city of Brighton in the UK, whose MP Caroline Lucas was the sole Green Party MP voted into the British Parliament in the 2010, 2015 and 2017 general elections.

=== Top cities list ===
United States cities (2017)			Global cities (2018)			Canadian cities (2018)		
1	Vancouver	Washington	1	Brighton and Hove	United Kingdom	1	Montreal	Quebec
2	Salt Lake City	Utah	2	Portland	Oregon, U.S.	2	Kelowna	British Columbia
3	Cincinnati	Ohio	3	Salt Lake City	Utah, U.S.	3	St. Catharines	Ontario
4	Boise	Idaho	4	Seattle	Washington, U.S.	4	Vancouver	British Columbia
5	Richmond	Virginia	5	Lisbon	Portugal	5	Regina	Saskatchewan
6	Tacoma	Washington	6	Fort Lauderdale	Florida, U.S.	6	Halifax	Nova Scotia
7	Spokane	Washington	7	Miami	Florida, U.S.	7	Windsor	Ontario
8	Atlanta	Georgia	8	Orlando	Florida, U.S.	8	Oshawa	Ontario
9	Grand Rapids	Michigan	9	Helsinki	Finland	9	Calgary	Alberta
10	Rochester	New York	10	Spokane	Washington, U.S.	10	London	Ontario
11	Orlando	Florida	11	Tampa	Florida, U.S.	11	Barrie	Ontario
12	Portland	Oregon	12	Eugene	Oregon, U.S.	12	Kingston	Ontario
13	Knoxville	Tennessee	13	Minneapolis	Minnesota, U.S.	13	Kitchener	Ontario
14	Tucson	Arizona	14	Atlanta	Georgia, U.S.	14	Winnipeg	Manitoba
15	Santa Rosa	California	15	San Francisco	California, U.S.	15	Saskatoon	Saskatchewan
16	Birmingham	Alabama	16	Rochester	New York, U.S.	16	Saguenay	Quebec
17	Tampa	Florida	17	Bordeaux	France	17	Ottawa	Ontario
18	Reno	Nevada	18	Pittsburgh	Pennsylvania, U.S.	18	Edson	Alberta
19	Albuquerque	New Mexico	19	Las Vegas	Nevada, U.S.	19	Hamilton	Ontario
20	Seattle	Washington	20	Richmond	Virginia, U.S.	20	Trois-Rivières	Quebec

=== Pacific Northwest ===
In the above global index put out by MoveHub, three of the ten most hipster-centric cities around the world were listed as being in either Oregon or Washington state: Portland, Seattle, and Spokane. Of the top 20 hipster cities in the U.S., six of them were in the Pacific Northwest. This includes, in order: Vancouver, Washington; Boise, Idaho; Tacoma, Washington; Spokane, Washington; Portland, Oregon; and Seattle, Washington.

While Canada as a whole is often known for their liberal philosophy and openness towards alternative living, some of the listed hipster cities in Canada are in the Canadian province of British Columbia, which is just north of Washington state, and this included three of the five top-ranking cities—Victoria, Kelowna, and Vancouver.

=== Southwestern U.S. ===
Young adults or Millennials are increasingly influencing culture in a number of cities throughout the Southwest and Rocky Mountain region. These cities are gaining a distinctive artsy atmosphere which is strongly associated with the term "hipster". This rise forms havens for alternative liberal lifestyles and politics in the midst of regions which normally have a strong association with the GOP and very traditional, conservative values.

One of these cities is Austin, Texas, well known as the home of the South by Southwest Music Festival. Texas is well known for its loyalty to the Republican party, but Austin is one of the few locales in Texas that reliably vote Democratic. There are also several organic foods and cosmetics companies based out of the city. The neighborhood of East Austin is an especially popular neighborhood for hipster-types to live in.

Another example of a liberal enclave in a conservative state is Salt Lake City, Utah. In the 2016 Presidential Election, a majority of voters chose Democrat Hillary Clinton in only two Utah counties, both located right around Salt Lake City. On the aforementioned MoveHub list of the 20 most hipster cities in America, Salt Lake City placed No. 2 in the whole nation. In a state known for its Mormon faith, Salt Lake City has become a favorite residence of LGBT people, and has sprouted an impressive host of microbreweries. The city also has many vegan stores and hiking trails.

Other locales in the Southwest region which made MoveHub's list of the 20 Most Hipster Cities include Tucson, Arizona; Santa Rosa, California; Reno, Nevada; and Albuquerque, New Mexico.

=== New York City ===
As hipsters—"young creatives" priced out of Bohemian urban neighborhoods in Brooklyn such as Williamsburg, Park Slope, and Greenpoint—moved into suburbs near New York City, The New York Times coined the neologism "Hipsturbia" to describe the hip lifestyle as lived in suburbia. Hastings-on-Hudson, Dobbs Ferry, Irvington, and Tarrytown, all in nearby Westchester County, were cited.

A minor trend of cross acculturation of Chabad Hasidism and Hipster subculture appeared within the New York Jewish community, beginning in the late 2000s. A significant number of members of the Chabad Hasidic community, mostly residing Crown Heights, Brooklyn, appear to now have adopted various cultural affinities as the local hipster subculture. These cross-acculturated Hasidim have been dubbed "Chabad hipsters" or "Hasidic hipsters". The Soho Synagogue, established by Chabad emissaries in SoHo, Manhattan, have branded themselves as a "hipster synagogue". The trend of Chabad Hasidic hipsters stands in contrast to the tensions experienced between the Satmar Hasidic community in Williamsburg and local hipsters.

The 2014 song "Brooklyn Baby" by Lana Del Rey is notable for containing satirical elements targeting the New York hipster subculture: its chorus highlights "a stable of cliches about hipsters, Brooklyn, millennials and other things Del Rey herself is known to idolize." These elements include: having a boyfriend in a band, drug use (of amphetamines and hydroponic marijuana), obsession with Lou Reed and Beat Generation poetry, wearing feathers in hair, collecting jazz records, playing different musical instruments, and self-proclaiming coolness.

There has been a parallel movement within the American Muslim community with members termed "mipsters".

=== Russia ===
The Soviet equivalent of the hipster or beatnik, known as stilyagi, first appeared during the mid 1950s and identified with the modern jazz scene. Their outfits were exaggerated caricatures of the costumes worn by western actors and musicians and typically incorporated bright colors, slim-fit pants, thick-soled shoes, vintage clothing from the 1920s and earlier, brightly colored socks, and plaid sportcoats. Following the release of a cult film in 2008, modern hipsters in Moscow and Saint Petersburg revived some aspects of this subculture.

== Racism ==
Hipster racism is engaging in behaviors typically regarded as racist and defending them as being performed ironically or satirically. Rachel Dubrofsky and Megan W. Wood have described it as being supposedly "too hip and self-aware to actually mean the racist stuff one expresses." This might include wearing blackface and other performances of stereotyped African Americans, use of the word nigger, and appropriating cultural dress. Talia Meer argues that hipster racism is rooted in what she calls "hipster exceptionalism", meaning "the idea that something ordinarily offensive or prejudiced is miraculously transformed into something clever, funny and socially relevant, by the assertion that said ordinarily offensive thing is ironic or satirical." As Leslie A. Hahner and Scott J. Varda described it, "those participating in acts of hipster racism understand those acts as racist when practiced by others, but rationalize their own racist performances through a presumed exceptionalism."

=== Hipsters and neo-Nazism ===
Nipsters are a right-wing neo-Nazi hipster movement that emerged in 2014. Nipsters have found ways to bypass the inhibition against right-wing extremist recruitment of adolescents in Germany through their indistinguishable similarity to and affiliation with the hipster subculture. The media uses the term nipster (a portmanteau of Nazi and hipster) for people who combine hipster style with right-wing and neo-Nazi extremism.

British neo-Nazi terrorist organisation National Action was said to have been a "mixture of hipsters and skinheads." The National, a Scottish newspaper, described the group as consisting of mostly middle-class hipster neo-fascists.

== Sexism ==
Hipster sexism, also known as everyday sexism, or ironic sexism, is defined by Alissa Quart in New York magazine's fashion blog The Cut as "the objectification of women but in a manner that uses mockery, quotation marks, and paradox." It is a form of self-aware sexism that is deemed acceptable given that its perpetrators are conscious of the inherent sexism and objectification of women in whatever action or statement is being carried out by them. It is rooted in the idea that sexism is an outdated and archaic institution which people do not engage in anymore, thereby making the demonstration of sexism seem satirical and ironic.

Hipster sexism may be presented with derision and expressed as harmless. Quart posits that hipster sexism "is a distancing gesture, a belief that simply by applying quotations, uncool, questionable, and even offensive material about women can be alchemically transformed." She notes this form of sexism as having a particular public admissibility, saying that it perpetuates sexism in general due to a public tolerance based upon reasoning that instances of hipster sexism are humorous. Distinguishing socially critiquing comedy from hipster sexism, feminist discourse discusses hipster sexism as humor which, rather than offering critique, employs an evasive methodology which maintains stereotypes and prejudice. Psychology professor Octavia Calder-Dawe suggests that due to this, the practice of hipster sexism also unconsciously influences the idea that sexism should not be spoken of. Hipster sexism relates to postfeminism in that it downplays sexism at large by casually normalizing it on the basis that sexism has been eradicated and thus is not appropriate for serious consideration or discussion.

A tenet of hipster sexism is the casual use of derogatory words such as "bitch" and "slut", on the basis that such use is intended as ironic. Jessica Wakeman, a contributor to The Frisky, suggests that the label hipster sexism enables casual sexism as a means of being ironic, and thus being seen as an acceptable form of sexism.

Quart coined the term "hipster sexism" in 2012, partly as a comment on "hipster racism", a term coined by Carmen Van Kerckhove circa 2007 which had been popularized earlier in 2012. She differentiated it from "classic sexism", which she describes as being "un-ironic, explicit, violent [and] banal."

== Analysis ==
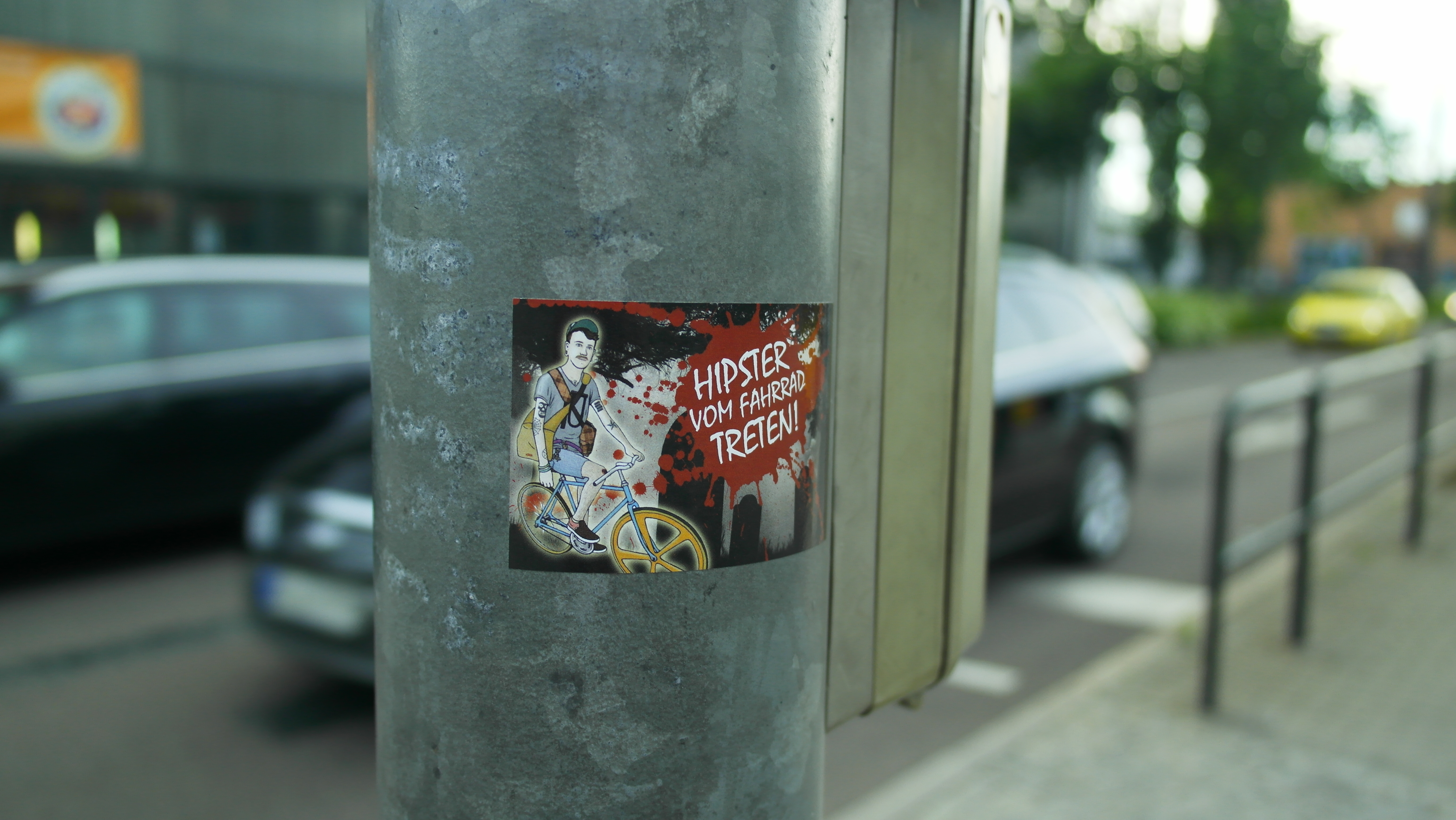
2014 anti-hipster sticker in Dresden, Germany

A 2016 literature review in the European Journal of Cultural Studies summarised the hipster culture "as a translocal and layered phenomenon with contextually specific claims to authenticity". While noting that the identity markers realised by hipsters are often localised, it states that

What is absolutely crucial – and global – in defining a hipster is the claim to authenticity, uniqueness and individuality. Being a true hipster is about 'being real', and not 'trying too hard'. 'Being real', however, demands identity work, and being a hipster comes with very strong and reoccurring identity discourses that all focus on authenticity, yet paradoxically form the basis of a very collective style.

Christian Lorentzen of Time Out New York argues that "hipsterism fetishizes the authentic" elements of all of the "fringe movements of the postwar era—Beat, hippie, punk, even grunge," and draws on the "cultural stores of every unmelted ethnicity" and "gay style", and then "regurgitates it with a winking inauthenticity." He claims that this group of "18-to-34-year-olds", who are mostly white, "have defanged, skinned and consumed" all of these influences. Lorentzen says hipsters, "in their present undead incarnation", are "essentially people who think of themselves as being cooler than America," also referring to them as "the assassins of cool". He argues that metrosexuality is the hipster appropriation of gay culture, as a trait carried over from their "Emo" phase. He writes that "these aesthetics are assimilated—cannibalized—into a repertoire of meaninglessness, from which the hipster can construct an identity in the manner of a collage, or a shuffled playlist on an iPod." He also criticizes how the subculture's original menace has long been abandoned and has been replaced with "the form of not-quite-passive aggression called snark."

In a Huffington Post article entitled "Who's a Hipster?", Julia Plevin argues that the "definition of 'hipster' remains opaque to anyone outside this self-proclaiming, highly-selective circle." She claims that the "whole point of hipsters is that they avoid labels and being labeled. However, they all dress the same and act the same and conform in their non-conformity" to an "iconic carefully created sloppy vintage look."

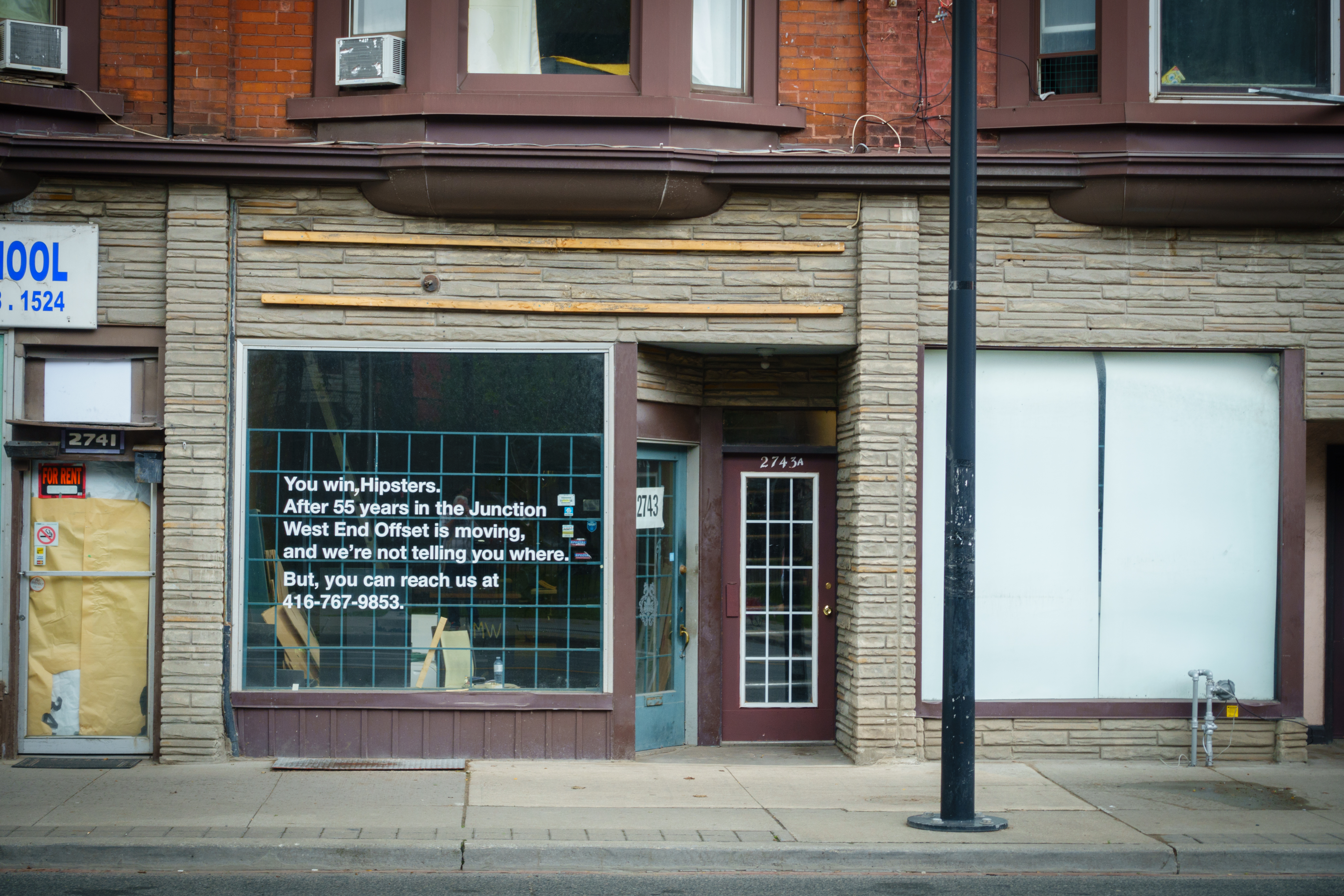
"You Win, Hipsters." Long-time Toronto, Canada, business relocates when hipsters adopt The Junction.

Rob Horning developed a critique of hipsterism in his April 2009 article "The Death of the Hipster" in PopMatters, exploring several possible definitions for the hipster. He muses that the hipster might be the "embodiment of postmodernism as a spent force, revealing what happens when pastiche and irony exhaust themselves as aesthetics," or might be "a kind of permanent cultural middleman in hypermediated late capitalism, selling out alternative sources of social power developed by outsider groups, just as the original 'white negros' evinced by Norman Mailer did to the original, pre-pejorative 'hipsters'—blacks." Horning also proposed that the role of hipsters may be to "appropriat[e] the new cultural capital forms, delivering them to mainstream media in a commercial form and stripping their inventors ... of the power and the glory." Horning argues that the "problem with hipsters" is the "way in which they reduce the particularity of anything you might be curious about or invested in into the same dreary common denominator of how 'cool' it is perceived to be," as "just another signifier of personal identity". Furthermore, he argues that the "hipster is defined by a lack of authenticity, by a sense of lateness to the scene" or the way that they transform the situation into a "self-conscious scene, something others can scrutinize and exploit."

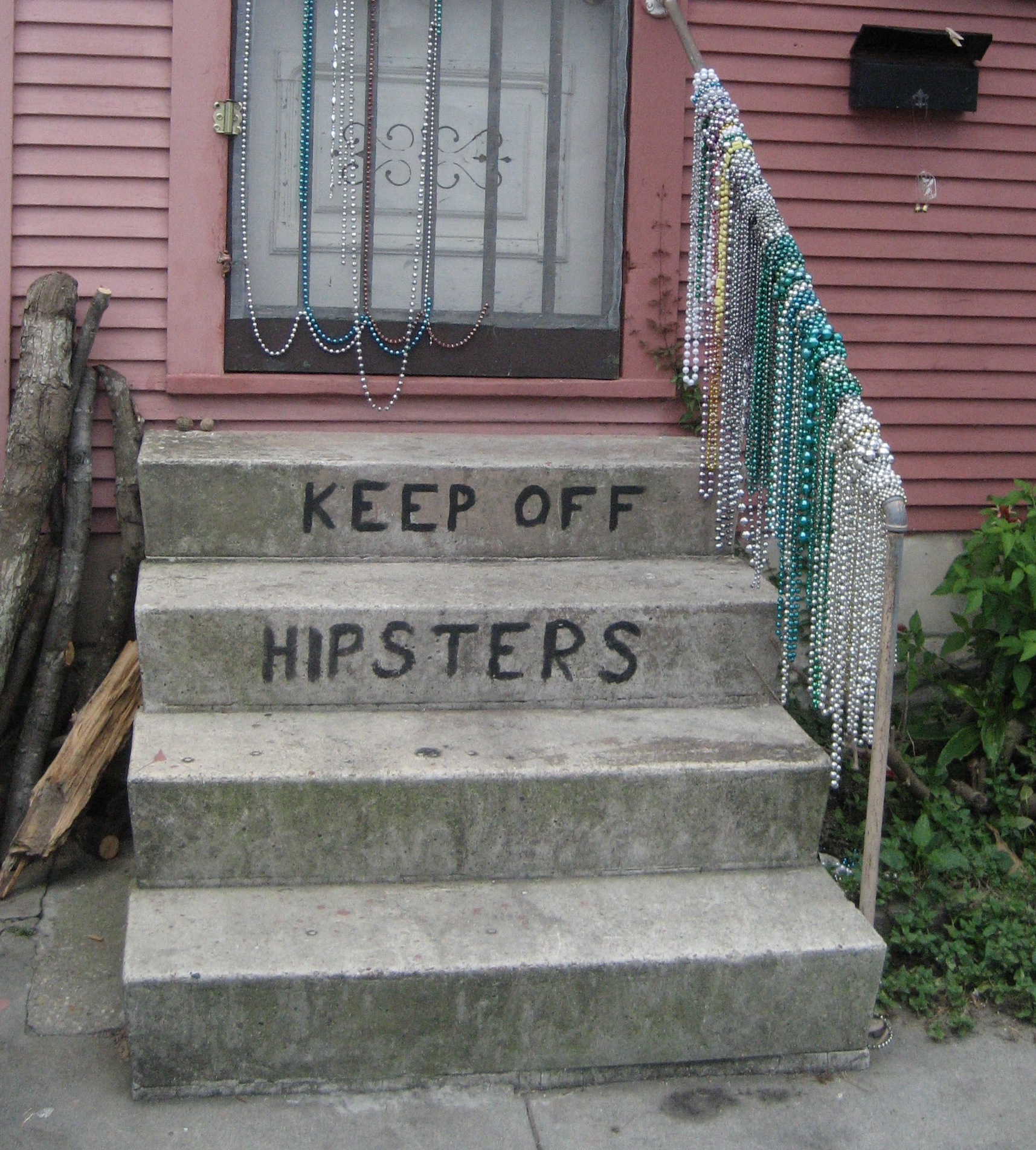
"Hipsters manage to attract a loathing unique in its intensity." –Dan Fletcher, Time Magazine.

Dan Fletcher in Time seems to support this theory, positing that stores like Urban Outfitters have mass-produced hipster chic, merging hipsterdom with parts of mainstream culture, thus overshadowing its originators' still-strong alternative art and music scene. According to Fletcher, "Hipsters manage to attract a loathing unique in its intensity. Critics have described the loosely defined group as smug, full of contradictions and, ultimately, the dead end of Western civilization."

Elise Thompson, an editor for the LA blog LAist, writes that "people who came of age in the 70s and 80s punk rock movement seem to universally hate 'hipsters'," which she defines as people wearing "expensive 'alternative' fashion[s]", going to the "latest, coolest, hippest bar...[and] listen[ing] to the latest, coolest, hippest band." Thompson argues that hipsters "don't seem to subscribe to any particular philosophy ... [or] ... particular genre of music." Instead, she argues that they are "soldiers of fortune of style" who take up whatever is popular and in style, "appropriat[ing] the style[s]" of past countercultural movements such as punk, while "discard[ing] everything that the style stood for."

Drawing from Pierre Bourdieu's work and Thomas Frank's theories of co-optation, Zeynep Arsel and Craig Thompson argue that in order to segment and co-opt the indie marketplace, mass media and marketers have engaged in commercial "mythmaking" and contributed to the formation of the contemporary discourse about hipsters. They substantiate this argument using a historical discourse analysis of the term and its use in the popular culture, based on Arsel's dissertation that was published in 2007. Their claim is that the contemporary depiction of hipster is generated through mass media narratives with different commercial and ideological interests. In other words, hipster is less of an objective category, and more of a culturally- and ideologically-shaped and mass-mediated modern mythology that appropriates the indie consumption field and eventually turns into a form of stigma. Arsel and Thompson also interview participants of the indie culture (DJs, designers, writers) to better understand how they feel about being labeled as one. Their findings demonstrate three strategies for dissociation from the hipster stereotype: aesthetic discrimination, symbolic demarcation, and proclaiming sovereignty. These strategies, empowered by one's status in the indie field (or their cultural capital) enable these individuals to defend their field dependent cultural investments and tastes from devaluing hipster mythology.

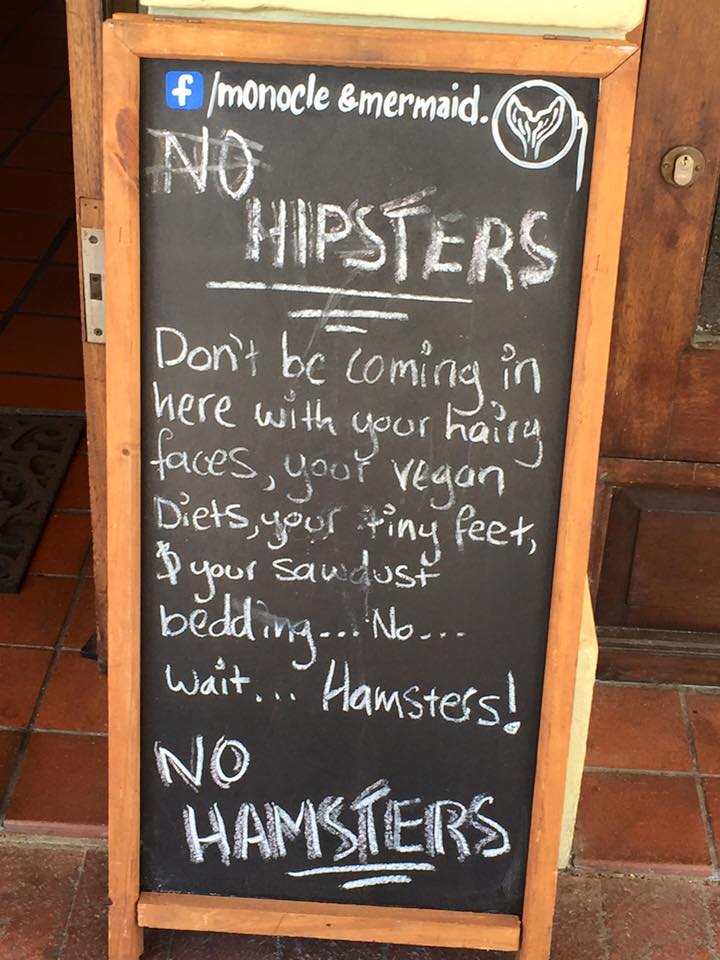
Humorous "no hipsters" sign at the entrance to a bar in Cape Town

Arsel and Thompson's work seeks to explain why people who are ostensibly fitting the hipster stereotype profusely deny being one: they argue that hipster mythology devalues their tastes and interests and thus they have to socially distinguish themselves from this cultural category and defend their tastes from devaluation. To succeed in denying being a hipster, while looking, acting, and consuming like one, Arsel and Thompson suggest that these individuals demythologize their existing consumption practices by engaging in rhetorics and practices that symbolically differentiate their actions from the hipster stigma.

Mark Greif, a founder of n+1 and an assistant professor at The New School, in a New York Times editorial, states that "hipster" is often used by youth from disparate economic backgrounds to jockey for social position. He questions the contradictory nature of the label, and the way that no one thinks of themselves as a hipster: "Paradoxically, those who used the insult were themselves often said to resemble hipsters—they wore the skinny jeans and big eyeglasses, gathered in tiny enclaves in big cities, and looked down on mainstream fashions and 'tourists'." He believes the much-cited difficulty in analyzing the term stems from the fact that any attempt to do so provokes universal anxiety, since it "calls everyone's bluff." Like Arsel and Thompson, he draws from La Distinction by Pierre Bourdieu to conclude that young, upper-middle-class graduates who move to urban centers are ridiculed as "liberal arts college grads with too much time on their hands"; although "ignored in the urban hierarchy", they have cultural capital. Members of the upper class – ridiculed in turn as "trust fund hipsters" – "convert real capital into 'cultural capital'." At the bottom are the lower-middle-class young, who "seem most authentic but are also often the most socially precarious." Without the capital of the other groups, they depend on their fashion sense to maintain a sense of superiority.

Greif's efforts puts the term "hipster" into a socioeconomic framework rooted in the petit bourgeois tendencies of a youth generation unsure of their future social status. The cultural trend is indicative of a social structure with heightened economic anxiety and lessened class mobility.

In 21st-century society, there are inevitably people who refuse to conform to the dominant culture and seek to do the exact opposite; given enough time, the anti-conformists will become more homogeneous with respect to their own subculture, making their behavior the opposite to any claims of counterculture. This synchronization occurs even if more than two choices are available, such as multiple styles of beard rather than whether or not to have a beard. Mathematician Jonathan Touboul of Brandeis University who studies how information propagation through society affects human behavior calls this the hipster effect.

== See also ==
- 2010s in fashion
- Indie sleaze
- Dandy
- Lumbersexual
- Normcore
- Scene (subculture)
- Bobo (socio-economic group) (Bourgeois-Bohèmes), also known as "bobos", are most likely the French origin of hipsters.
- Performative male
- Dimes Square
