= The Hipster Handbook =

2003 book by Robert Lanham

- Cover of first Anchor Books edition (paperback)
- Author: Robert Lanham
- Language: English
- Genre: Humor
- Publisher: Anchor Books (a division of Random House
- Publication date: 2003
- Publication place: United States
- Media type: paperback (first edition)
- Pages: 169 pp (first edition paperback)
- ISBN: 1-4000-3201-6 (first edition paperback)
- OCLC: 50554281
- Dewey Decimal: 818/.602 21
- LC Class: PN6165 .L36 2003

The Hipster Handbook (2003) is a satirical guide to hipster culture by Williamsburg, Brooklyn author Robert Lanham.

It includes a lexicon of words such as "deck" which means "cool" and "fin" which means "not so cool", as well as chapters that describe and explain all that which makes up a hipster. A quiz in the back of the book rates readers on their level of hipsterdom, rewarding high scores to those who answer the questions in the manner of art school students and well-cultured, well-dressed, self-proclaimed hyper-intellectuals. Esquire called the book "The Official Preppy Handbook for people who wear Atari T-shirts."

== Critical reception ==
Reviews were mixed. Rick Marin, of the New York Times, gave it a favorable review, though he pointed out "much of the hipsterism he sanctions seems pretty mainstream, even if it is being 'appropriated'...Such quibbles, though, won't penetrate the protective pomo coating on Lanham's mirrored shades." Ben McGrath, of Slate, described the book as "so comprehensive and so well-done that only a poseur could criticize it without tongue in cheek." Others have criticized the "veiled hostility" and "aura of trying too hard."

A sequel was published in 2004: Food Court Druids, Cherohonkees and Other Creatures Unique to the Republic.

== See also ==
- Grunge speak
