= Nipster =

Neo-Nazis who have embraced aspects of hipster culture

A Nipster is a young neo-Nazi who has embraced aspects of hipster culture. Historically, German neo-Nazis promoted an ultra-masculine and extreme right-wing image, preferring short hair, violent imagery and combat gear—in keeping with the white power skinhead or casual subcultures—while rejecting most modern pop culture. This has changed, with young "Nipsters" embracing causes such as animal rights and environmentalism alongside historically far right positions, including ultranationalist views. Nipsters, rather than rejecting modern pop culture, seek instead to appropriate it to promote neo-Nazi ideals. This has also been seen in the New Right and National Anarchism movements.

Rolling Stone magazine profiled Patrick Schroeder, one of the founders of the Nipster movement, who said he desires to "give the German National Socialist movement a friendlier, hipper face". Schroeder says that neo-Nazis who can "live within the mainstream", such as Nipsters, are "the future of the movement".

== See also ==
- Autonome Nationalisten
- Culture jamming
- Ecofascism
- Hipster racism
