= Hipster racism =

Behavior typically regarded as racist, defended as intended to be ironic or satirical

Hipster racism is an antic, or form of behavior, whereby the individual acts in a way typically regarded as racist and defends the offending action as being performed ironically or satirically. Rachel Dubrofsky and Megan W. Wood have described it as being supposedly "too hip and self-aware to actually mean the racist stuff one expresses". This might include wearing blackface and other performances of stereotyped African Americans, use of the N-word, and appropriating cultural dress.

Talia Meer argues that hipster racism is rooted in what she calls "hipster exceptionalism", meaning "the idea that something ordinarily offensive or prejudiced is miraculously transformed into something clever, funny and socially relevant, by the assertion that said ordinarily offensive thing is ironic or satirical." As Leslie A. Hahner and Scott J. Varda described it, "those participating in acts of hipster racism understand those acts as racist when practiced by others, but rationalize their own racist performances through a presumed exceptionalism."

== History ==
Carmen Van Kerckhove coined the term hipster racism in the article "The 10 Biggest Race and Pop Culture Trends of 2006", citing "Kill Whitey" Parties and "Blackface Jesus" as examples. "Kill Whitey" parties, as described by The Washington Post, were parties held for hipsters in Williamsburg, Brooklyn, by Jeremy Parker, a disc jockey who goes by the name Tha Pumpsta, in an attempt to "kill the whiteness inside". These were parties in which white hipsters mocked the black hip-hop industry, and essentially a part of African-American culture, for the sake of irony. Sierra and Bianca Casady of CocoRosie were noted as regulars at "Kill Whitey" parties. Van Kerckhove also regarded the use of blackface by white people and the normalization and acceptance of such use from other individuals as hipster racism. Van Kerckhove contends, quoting Debra Dickerson, that the use of blackface by individuals such as these was an effort to satirize political correctness and racism.

Matt Pearce of the Los Angeles Times characterized the appropriation of cultural artifacts as fashion without recognizing the significance of the article as hipster racism. Examples include wearing Native American headdresses, or more specifically, Urban Outfitters selling clothes with Navajo and other Aboriginal and African tribal prints without giving tribute, acknowledgement, or compensation. Filmmaker Lena Dunham was described as a hipster racist when Dunham defended her Girls collaborator and screenwriter Murray Miller after he was accused of sexual assault by actress Aurora Perrineau, who is of mixed race.

== See also ==
- Hipster sexism
- Irony poisoning
- Nipster
