= Harsh Realm =

1999 television series by Chris Carter

- Genre: Science fiction
- Developed by: Chris Carter
- Starring: Scott Bairstow; D. B. Sweeney; Max Martini; Rachel Hayward; Sarah-Jane Redmond; Samantha Mathis; Terry O'Quinn
- Composer: Mark Snow
- Country of origin: United States
- Original language: English
- No. of seasons: 1
- No. of episodes: 9

Production
- Executive producers: Chris Carter; Frank Spotnitz; Daniel Sackheim
- Producer: George A. Grieve
- Running time: 45 minutes
- Production companies: Ten Thirteen Productions; 20th Century Fox Television

Original release
- Network: Fox
- Release: October 8 – October 22, 1999
- Network: FX
- Release: April 14 – May 19, 2000

Harsh Realm is an American science fiction television series about humans trapped inside a virtual reality simulation. It was developed by Chris Carter, creator of The X-Files and Millennium, and began airing on the Fox Network on October 8, 1999. The series fared poorly in the ratings and was removed from the schedule after three of its nine episodes had aired. The remaining six episodes premiered on the FX Network. Repeats of the series began airing Fall 2007 on CBC Country Canada.

The term "harsh realm" originates from the "grunge speak" hoax of 1992, in which it meant "bummer".

The show was loosely based on a comic book by James D. Hudnall and Andrew Paquette. When the creators noticed the credits read "Created by Chris Carter", they sued Fox to get properly credited. The credits were changed to read "Inspired by the Harsh Realm comic book series, Created by James D. Hudnall and Andrew Paquette, Published by Harris Publications, Inc."

The series was filmed in Vancouver, British Columbia, Canada.

== Setting ==
Harsh Realm is a virtual reality game created by the U.S. Army, programmed to minutely replicate the real world for training simulations. In the world of Harsh Realm, a small nuclear bomb is detonated in the program's version of New York City, killing four million people and thrusting its participants into a post-apocalyptic disaster scenario.

Lieutenant Tom Hobbes is unknowingly thrust into this world by his superiors with one mission: to kill "General" Omar Santiago. Along the way, he meets fellow soldiers sent into the game and alternate versions of people he knows in the real world. Tom Hobbes quickly finds companions such as Mike Pinocchio (a cynical long-time resident of Harsh Realm), Florence (a mute with mysterious powers) and Dexter (an alternate version of his real world dog).

Hobbes' target is Santiago, the highest scorer in Harsh Realm. Santiago, a U.S. Army Sergeant Major in the "real world", is now a self-proclaimed "General" in the simulation who controls five U.S. states as a brutal dictator.

From his new companions, Hobbes learns that Santiago has commandeered Harsh Realm; Hobbes is merely the latest soldier in a long line of men sent on unsuccessful missions to kill the would-be dictator. Hobbes also learns from a mysterious "ally", Inga Fossa, that Santiago is planning the ultimate act of terrorism in the real world so that Harsh Realm is all that remains.

It is in this world that Hobbes must survive, defeat Santiago, save the real world, and somehow return to his real life and his fiancée, Sophie Green.

== Cast ==
- Scott Bairstow as Tom Hobbes. Lieutenant Thomas F. Hobbes was just days away from being discharged from the Army when he was called upon for one last mission and sent into the virtual reality simulation known as Harsh Realm. He was forced to leave behind his fiancée Sophie Green and put off their plans to move to California as a result. Hobbes was decorated for saving the life of his friend and comrade Mel Waters when they served together in Sarajevo in 1994. In the realm, Hobbes was reunited with the virtual character of his dog Dexter, who had died before the series. He also came upon the dying virtual copy of his mother, Katherine, at the same time she was dying of cancer in the real world. Hobbes grew up in Columbus, Ohio. His name is a reference to the 17th-century English philosopher Thomas Hobbes. Hobbes used a Heckler & Koch P7 pistol in the Pilot episode before moving onto the SIG Sauer P226 in episodes 2, 3, and 4, and then a Walther P99 for the remainder of the series. He also uses a Beretta M93R in episode 7.
- D. B. Sweeney as Mike Pinocchio . Specialist-4 Mike Pinocchio served in Operation Desert Storm. After that, he served in Yugoslavia, where he was severely injured by a land mine. The loss of his leg and eye prompted him to volunteer to go into Harsh Realm (in which Pinocchio has neither injury). In the Realm, he worked for Santiago before presumably faking his own death and going to live outside the fence. He is forced into an uneasy alliance with Tom Hobbes after attempting to rob him upon Hobbes' first entering the realm. He drives a modified 1972 Chevrolet Chevelle. His gun is a Heckler & Koch MP5K PDW.
- Rachel Hayward as Florence. Florence is a mute VC ("virtual character") with the ability to heal injuries that occur within the game (although pre-existing conditions coded into the game are beyond her capabilities). She was a member of a group known as the Sisters, all of whom were mute healers, but she left the religious group and took up arms. She now works as a mercenary of sorts, though she shows some loyalty to Mike Pinocchio. Her gun is a CAR-15 Commando (specifically, the Model 649 GAU-5A/A variant, as indicated by the 11.5 inch barrel, A1-type rear sight, and lack of forward assist and case deflector).
- Terry O'Quinn as Omar Santiago. In the real world, Santiago is a sergeant major in the U.S. Army and the most-decorated combat veteran to serve in Southeast Asia. He then retired, but apparently that retirement took him to Harsh Realm, where he holds the rank of General in the Republican Guard and is working from his Santiago City headquarters to take over the United States, renaming it the United States of Santiago. Pinocchio claims that Santiago is able to go in and out of the game at will, though how is unclear. The US government in the real world wants him dead, which prompts their sending Hobbes into the realm to stop him. His plans are said to involve destroying the real world so that Harsh Realm, where his rule is total, becomes the new reality.
- Max Martini as Mel Waters. Although they were best friends in the real world, Waters and Hobbes are at odds in Harsh Realm. Hobbes finds that Waters married Sophie's virtual character, to his horror; things become even more complicated when Waters accidentally shoots and kills her at the end of the pilot. Waters holds the rank of major in the Republican Guard (Waters' real world military rank was sergeant) and often reports directly to Santiago. His gun is a Taurus PT99.
- Sarah-Jane Redmond as Inga Fossa. She works with the military in Fort Dix, New Jersey. She can come and go as she pleases between Harsh Realm and the real world, where she approached Sophie Green with information. She has a past connection to Pinocchio. Her motives in Harsh Realm are unclear, having also worked with Santiago, Waters, and aiding Tom Hobbes. "Inga Fossa" translates to "in the trench" in Latin. Redmond appeared in the 2008 film The X-Files: I Want to Believe as a character referred to on-screen as "Agent Fossa", possibly a reprisal of the character.
- Samantha Mathis as Sophie Green. Sophie is Hobbes' pregnant fiancée, whom he was forced to leave behind in the real world. She has two sisters and a brother named Sam. The "virtual character" version of Sophie within Harsh Realm briefly becomes Hobbs' ally until she is gunned down by Waters, who happens to be her husband in the realm. This angers Santiago, who realizes that her death, even if it is not real, will act as a drive for Hobbes to take Santiago down.

== Episodes ==
No.	Title	Directed by	Written by	Original release date	Prod. code
1	"Pilot"	Daniel Sackheim	Chris Carter	October 8, 1999	1ADC79
Decorated war hero Lieutenant Thomas Hobbes is about to retire from the military and start a new life with his beloved fiancée Sophie, when the government orders him for one last mission: play the virtual reality situational war game known as "Harsh Realm." But Hobbes finds himself stuck inside this computer game and all he wants is to get back to the real world and to get back to Sophie. The episode included uncredited cameos by Gillian Anderson of The X-Files as the narrator of the Harsh Realm training video and Lance Henriksen of Millennium as the general who recruits Hobbes for the game.
2	"Leviathan"	Daniel Sackheim	Chris Carter	October 15, 1999	1ADC01
The underworld outside of Santiago City has its share of renegades, and one particular is a bounty hunter who traps Pinocchio and Hobbes for his own reward. The bounty hunter cuts a deal with Santiago to barter his prisoners in return for passage back to the real world, but hides the true nature of his trade from girlfriend May In the real world: The military notifies Sophie that her fiancé Hobbes was killed in action. A grief-stricken Sophie is confused when a mysterious stranger leads her to believe that she doesn't know the whole story.
3	"Inga Fossa"	Bryan Spicer	Chris Carter	October 22, 1999	1ADC02
Hobbes, Pinocchio and Florence search for Freddie, the chip forger who will help them access Santiago City and gain entry to the secret portal back taking them back to the real world. More is learned about the true nature of Inga Fossa, and her relationships with other characters in the Realm.
4	"Kein Ausgang"	Cliff Bole	Steve Maeda	April 14, 2000 (on FX)	1ADC03
While looking for a soldier who once nearly penetrated Santiago's forces, Hobbes and Pinocchio get stuck in a combat simulation game of a World War II battle. They must find the jump-portal to escape the game, or else be destined to watch the battle scenario repeat over and over with the same outcome.
5	"Reunion"	Kim Manners	Greg Walker	April 21, 2000 (on FX)	1ADC06
Hobbes and Pinocchio are taken to a forced labor camp where Hobbes finds his mother, who is dying of cancer. Meanwhile, Sophie visits Hobbes' mother in the real world as she also struggles against cancer.
6	"Three Percenters"	Daniel Sackheim	Frank Spotnitz	April 28, 2000 (on FX)	1ADC05
Hobbes, Pinocchio, and Florence find themselves in a camp where the people preach nonviolence and use the promise of food to lure people to a strange lake that is capable of scanning people's images and creating copies of them.
7	"Manus Domini"	Tony To	John Shiban	May 5, 2000 (on FX)	1ADC04
Florence is captured while trying to save her Sisterhood from Santiago's forces. Hobbes and Pinocchio are caught in a mine blast while pursuing her; Pinocchio is badly injured and is taken into the Sister's care while Hobbes faces a deadly situation with a Republic Guard soldier.
8	"Cincinnati"	Larry Shaw	Chris Carter	May 12, 2000 (on FX)	1ADC07
Santiago wages a personal war against a Native American rebellion in Cincinnati, Ohio. Hobbes and Pinocchio attempt to use the opportunity to kill Santiago.
9	"Camera Obscura"	Jefery Levy	Steve Maeda	May 19, 2000 (on FX)	1ADC08
When they take a job as bodyguards, Hobbes and Pinocchio find themselves in the middle of a family feud mitigated by a priest who can see the future.

== Production ==
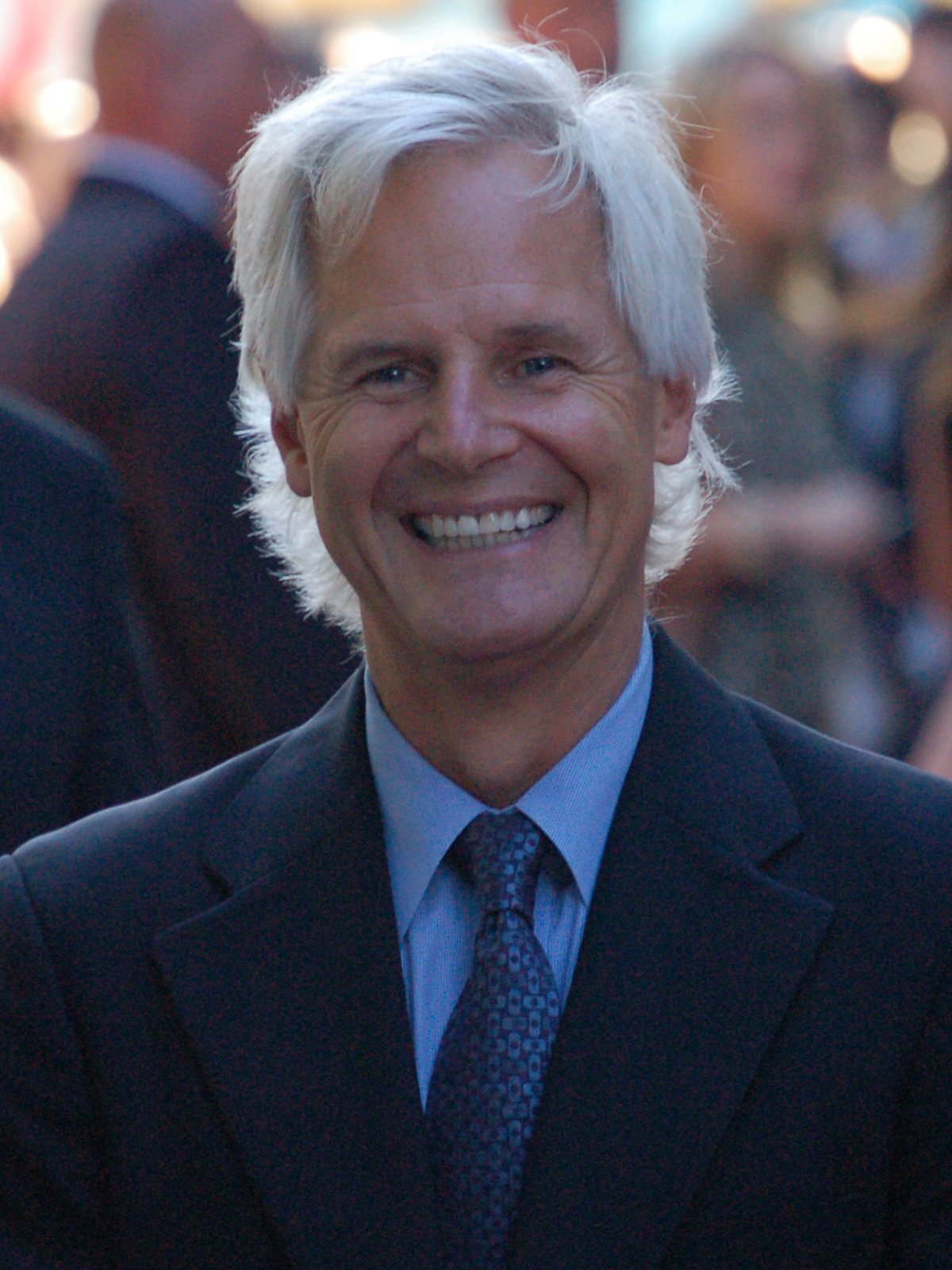
The pilot was written by Chris Carter, pictured in 2008.

The pilot was written by Chris Carter, best known as the creator of the science-fiction series The X-Files. Carter wrote the pilot as a "high-tech version" of his favorite films—Paths of Glory, Platoon and Blade Runner. He said of the pilot: "I think this has a tremendous romantic story and a great mythology potential, as well. I think it's a great chance to tell allegorical stories … to take a godless world, where there is no morality, where there is no standard or code of behavior, and see what the world would be like if it were like that." The Fox executives worried that pilot episode included too much violence for the 8:00 p.m. timeslot, and they tried to get the producers of the show to tone the violence down in upcoming episodes. American writer Judd Apatow said he doubted Carter would tone down the violence: "He's going to do what he wants to do, and he should. I don't think it's his place to tone it down for people. It's parents' place to say, 'You know what? You're not allowed to watch Harsh Realm'. But it's much easier to say, 'Take off the shows' than to tell parents to be aware of what their kids are doing." Terry O'Quinn stars in the episode as Omar Santiago. He was concerned that the viewers would find the show confusing, "There might be some things if you miss the first one you won't know what is going on. The writers are going to have to find a good one- or two-minute intro that explains things." When O'Quinn first read the script of the pilot, he "pretty much understood the concept of the show when I read it, but I had a hard time visualizing it. I'm kind of computer illiterate. So I had a tough time seeing it. But the fact that Carter is doing it is a good starting point."

A tenth episode, entitled "Circe", was written and directed by Mark Rosner, but never produced. In the episode Hobbes meets up with a woman claiming to be his old lover, while he was searching for an army to recruit. Pinocchio senses danger, and Florence finds both a prophecy and a traitor in the Resistance against Santiago.

== Music ==
The theme music contains samples of speeches given by Benito Mussolini.

- Pilot
  - Prodigy - Fat of the Land - "Climbatize"
  - White Zombie - AstroCreep: 2000 - "Electric Head Part 2"
  - Organik - "Piece of Meat"
- Leviathan
  - Moby - Play - "Run On"
  - Rob Zombie - Hellbilly Deluxe - "Superbeast"
- Inga Fossa
  - White Zombie - AstroCreep: 2000 - "Electric Head Part 1"
- Kein Ausgang
  - Édith Piaf - Love & Passion (box set) - "Y'A Pas D'Printemps"
- Camera Obscura
  - "Suo Gan"

== Reception ==
The debut episode was watched by 7.5 million viewers during its original airing in the United States.

On Rotten Tomatoes it has a score of 44% based on reviews from 18 critics. Ken Parish Perkins of the Philadelphia Inquirer called the pilot "dark, moody and confusing". Ed Bark of The Dallas Morning News said "Fans of heavy automatic weapons fire, bloodletting and unrelenting bleakness won't be disappointed. A supporting character named Mike Pinocchio supplies the gutter-level language, none of which can be printed here." David Kronke of the Daily News of Los Angeles said: "Fortunately, Carter makes the show's pilot episode exciting, smart and edgy enough that, for the time being, viewers will be intrigued enough to see how this ordeal will play out." Rob Owen of the Pittsburgh Post-Gazette wrote: "If most of these Harsh Realm characters are virtual, why should we care? And if the show is playing out inside Hobbes' brain, why do any of the events depicted matter? Presumably future episodes will answer those questions, but the pilot exudes lots of flash and little heart. The characters lack any spark of life and depth. Harsh Realm could improve, but at this point dark conspiracies and paranoia have become tiresome. How many viewers will stick with Harsh Realm to a point it starts to make sense?" Mark McGuire of the Times Union commented that "Carter's script and the direction of Daniel Sackheim are riddled with hoary, snory contemporary clichés."

Later Samantha Mathis said, "I mean, did it actually air? My recollection on having done that was that it was greenlit into production when one person was the president of the studio and when we aired someone else was the president of the studio and as often times happens things just get abandoned because they were made by the prior regime if you will and people want to clean house. But I thought that was a very interesting provocative landscape and I was excited to work with Chris Carter – that’s all I really remember about why that didn’t launch."

== Lawsuit ==
A lawsuit filed by the creators of the Harsh Realm comic book series that was licensed by Fox and Carter as the basis for the TV series became a precedent-setting case. In it, Fox attorneys argued that Carter's sole "written by" credit was not only warranted, but required under the rules of the Writers Guild of America (WGA). Fox argued – with the support of the WGA – that it could not give Hudnall and Paquette the credit they demanded, because of the WGA agreement. "The problem with this argument," Judge Martin responded, "is that [Hudnall and Paquette] are not members of the WGA and are not bound by its contract. If the listing of the credits violates [their] right under the Lanham Act, the fact that the violation is pursuant to a contract with a third party is no defense." In response to the comic book authors’ request for a preliminary injunction, Judge Martin found that "While there are substantial differences between the comic books and the television series, a trier of fact could find that it is misleading to represent Chris Carter as the creator of ‘Harsh Realm’ without giving adequate recognition to the role [Hudnall and Paquette] played in its creation."

== Home release ==
The DVD box set features two commentary tracks on the pilot episode by the show's creator and director as well as other special features.

== See also ==
- Simulated reality
