= Andrew Paquette =

American artist and writer (born 1965)

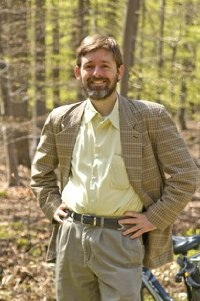
Paquette

Andrew Paquette is an artist and writer, known primarily for his work as a CG artist in the feature film and video game industry. Born in 1965 in St. Paul, Minnesota, he has lived in several states within the US, primarily New York, Maine, California, Minnesota, and Arizona. Currently he lives in the Netherlands, where he is an art teacher at a game-development school.

== Comic books ==
Paquette's first professional work as a comic book artist appeared in the now defunct title Dread of Night from Hamilton Comics. He later made several one-shot appearances as penciller, inker, or artist, in various titles from Marvel Comics and DC Comics, including a well-received story written by author Nicholas Vance in Hellraiser #14, Nightbreed #17, written by Larry Wachowski, of The Matrix fame, Teen Titans #87, A couple issues of Avengers, a Daredevil annual, Book of the Damned, Deathstroke and The Big Book of Urban Legends.

After these initial forays into comics, he became co-creator (with author James Hudnall) and penciller of the Harris Comics series Harsh Realm. His last comic, published immediately before entering the video game industry, was the self-parody Dr. Andy #1, published by the now defunct Alliance Comics.

== Harsh Realm ==
The Harsh Realm comic book series was optioned for use as a TV series by producer Daniel Sackheim and Fox television sometime prior to 1998. By 1999, the series was in production, with Fox veteran Chris Carter (The X-Files) at the helm. The series did not perform well and was cancelled almost as soon as it was released, after airing only three episodes on the Fox network. Later, all nine of the finished episodes were aired on the FX channel (owned by Fox) and then the series was released as a boxed set of DVDs. When the series first aired, credit was not given to either creator of the series, Paquette or Hudnall. The pair subsequently filed suit against Fox, Carter, and Harris Comics, asking for a preliminary injunction against airing further episodes until appropriate credit was given. In the final ruling on the matter, the injunction was granted, Fox relented and gave the two creators credit in the start credits, and the show was cancelled. Some believe there is a connection between the lawsuit and the series being cancelled, though the show's poor ratings are enough of a justification on their own.

The lawsuit against Carter was filed on October 13, which was both his birthday and Paquette's, as well as the name of Carter's production company, Ten Thirteen Productions.

== Credits ==
=== Video games ===
Paquette has credits for working on the following games:

- OMFII/Battlegrounds, Diversions Entertainment (worked on this product for Epic MegaGames) as lead artist 1994-1996.
- Unreal, Epic Megagames 1996, incidental character design.
- Tyrian, Epic Megagames 1996, Character design.
- Parasite Eve, SquareUSA 1998, Senior animator.
- Xena: Warrior Princess, Universal Studios Digital Arts 1999, Art director
- Scooby-Doo! Night of 100 Frights, Heavy Iron Studios/THQ 2002, Art director.
- Full Spectrum Warrior, Sony Pictures Imageworks/THQ 2004, Art director/CG Supervisor.

=== Feature films ===
Paquette has credits on the following films:

- Space Jam 1996, Warner Brothers, CG Lighter.
- Hard Rain 1998, CG Lighter.
- Smilla's Sense of Snow 1997, CG Lighter.
- Spider-Man 2002, Sony Pictures, Texture artist.
- Daredevil 2003, Texture artist.

=== Paintings ===
Paquette moved to Arizona in 2003 and made many large format plein-air acrylic landscapes. At the time, he showed at the Taos Gallery in Scottsdale.

=== Books ===
- Dreamer: 20 years of psychic dreams and how they changed my life, published by O-Books/John Hunt Publishing Ltd, Winchester, UK
- Computer Graphics for Artists: an Introduction, published by Springer/Verlag, London
- Computer Graphics for Artists II: Characters and Environments, published by Springer/Verlag, London
- Peripheral Vision (screenplay), published by Black Coat Press in 2004.
