= 10/13 =

Term in television series production

In television series production a 10/13 role plays a character who is a series regular, but is only guaranteed to be in 10 (out of 13) episodes.

10/13 roles typically pay less than a full-blown regular but the role still renders an actor ineligible for other pilots/series.

If the production decides to use the actor in more than 10 episodes, they have to pay premium.
