= Robert Lanham =

Robert Lanham (born 1971 in Richmond, Virginia) is the author of the satiric books The Hipster Handbook, Food Court Druids, Cherohonkees, and Other Creatures Unique to the Republic, and The Sinner's Guide to the Evangelical Right. He coined the term idiosyncrology, the study of idiosyncratic people. Neal Pollack calls Lanham "the Margaret Mead of the North American weirdo." In an article published in the fall of 2009, referred to Lanham as one of "Five Voices That Matter in the Music Blogosphere."

Lanham is also the editor of FREEwilliamsburg, a website covering the arts and culture of Williamsburg, Brooklyn. Lanham lives in Brooklyn, New York.
