= Irony poisoning =

Process of normalising a belief with humour

Irony poisoning is the process or altered state wherein one has a diminished capacity for distinguishing between one's own genuine beliefs and ironic beliefs through an overuse of irony. This can manifest in either an inability to state one's beliefs in a genuine way or genuinely echoing provocative sentiments they once held only ironically. Appearing in The New York Times in 2018, the term is often used to describe the normalization of extremist views through the use of humor, particularly in online spaces.

== Notable examples ==
The New York Times used the term to describe the chain of events that led up to the attempt of German man Dirk Denkhaus to set fire to a house sheltering refugees after exchanging racist memes and Nazi greetings online.

In 2022, the Canadian Anti-Hate Network described the Canadian alt-right organization Diagolon as using irony poisoning to desensitize users to hateful rhetoric through the use of online jokes and memes.

== See also ==
- Behavioral addiction
- Extremely online
- Far-right subcultures
- Hipster racism
- Poe's law
- Post-irony
