= Ten Thirteen Productions =

American production company

Ten Thirteen Productions is a production company founded by Chris Carter in 1993, which produced four television series and two films (The X-Files and The X-Files: I Want to Believe). The company was named after Carter's birthday, October 13. The Ten Thirteen offices are located in Santa Monica, Los Angeles, California.

== History ==
The company was founded when Carter began his series The X-Files in 1993. With the success of The X-Files continuously growing, in 1996 the company embarked on a new series - Millennium. The series lasted for three seasons. In 1998, they released a film simply titled The X-Files, which grossed $189,176,423 worldwide. In 1999, as Millennium was cancelled, a third series was put into production, Harsh Realm. Despite critical praise, it was canceled after only nine episodes. In 2001 they decided to create a direct spin-off from The X-Files and the result was The Lone Gunmen. This was canceled after one season.

== Filmography ==
=== Television series (1993–2018) ===
- The X-Files (1993–2002, 2016–2018)
- Millennium (1996–1999)
- Harsh Realm (1999–2000)
- The Lone Gunmen (2001)
- The After (2014), a pilot created by Chris Carter for Amazon Studios

=== Films ===
- The X-Files (1998)
- The X-Files: I Want to Believe (2008)
