= Hillary Clinton as First Lady of the United States =

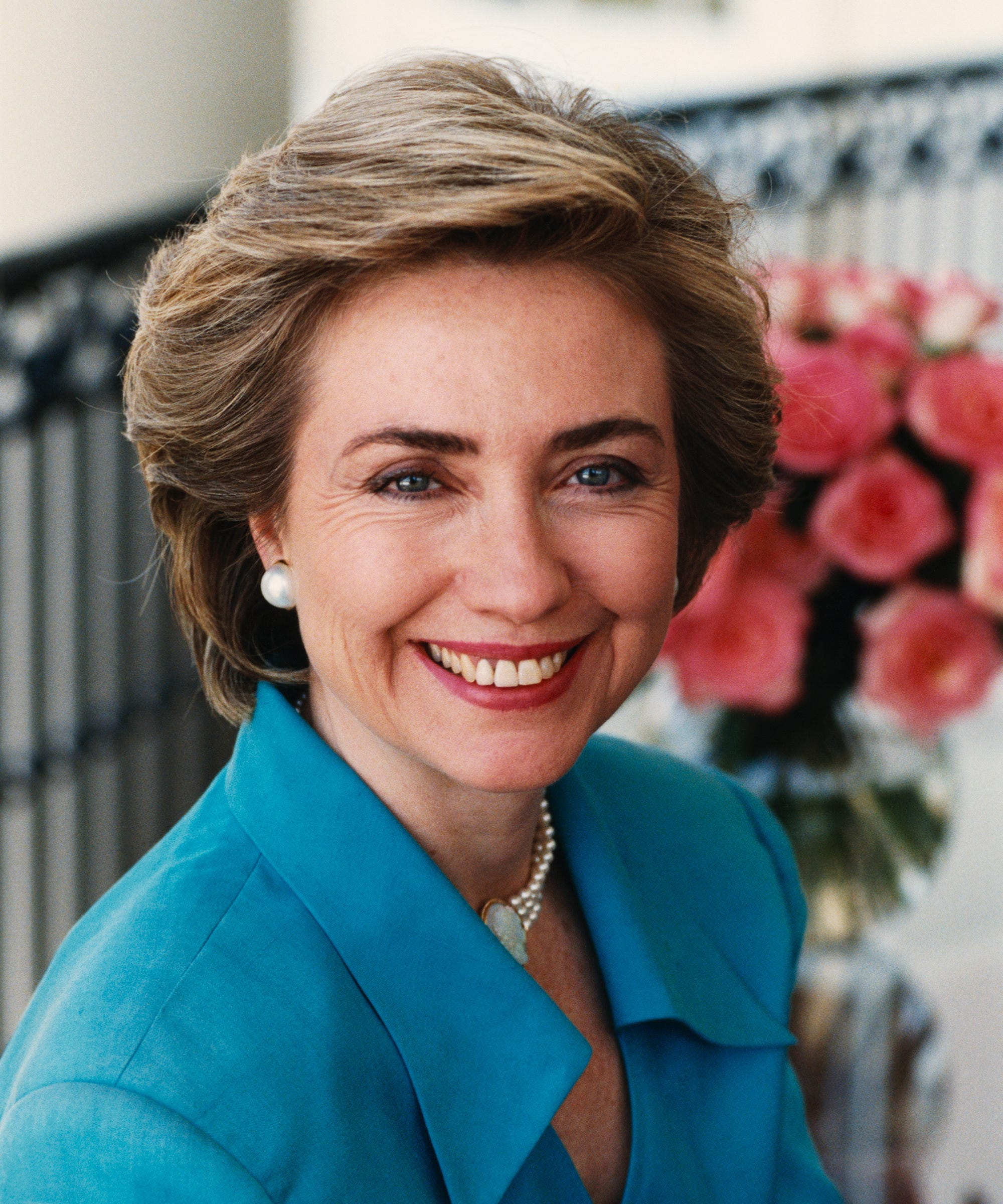
- Official portrait, 1993
- Hillary Clinton as First Lady of the United States; January 20, 1993 – January 20, 2001
- President: Bill Clinton

Hillary Clinton served as the first lady of the United States from 1993 until 2001, during the presidency of her husband Bill Clinton.

As the first lady of the U.S., Clinton advocated for healthcare reform. In 1994, her health care plan failed to gain approval from Congress. In 1997 and 1999, Clinton played a leading role in promoting the creation of the State Children's Health Insurance Program, the Adoption and Safe Families Act, and the Foster Care Independence Act. She also advocated for gender equality at the 1995 World Conference on Women. In 1998, Clinton's marital relationship came under public scrutiny during the Clinton-Lewinsky scandal, which led her to issue a statement that reaffirmed her commitment to the marriage.

== General overview ==
When Bill Clinton took office as president in January 1993, Hillary Clinton became the first lady. Her press secretary reiterated she would be using her married name rather than her maiden name Hillary Rodham. (Note: As of 1993, she had not legally changed her name from Hillary Rodham. Bill Clinton's advisers thought her use of her maiden name to be one of the reasons for his 1980 gubernatorial re-election loss. During the following winter, Vernon Jordan suggested to Hillary Rodham that she start using the name Clinton, and she began to do so publicly with her husband's February 1982 campaign announcement to regain that office. She later wrote, "I learned the hard way that some voters in Arkansas were seriously offended by the fact that I kept my maiden name." Once he was elected again, she made a point of using "Hillary Rodham Clinton" in work she did as First Lady of the state. Once she became first lady of the United States in 1993, she publicly stated that she wanted to be known as "Hillary Rodham Clinton". She has authored all her books under that name. She continued to use that name on her website and elsewhere once she was a U.S. senator. When she ran for president during 2007–08, she used the name "Hillary Clinton" or just "Hillary" in campaign materials. She used "Hillary Rodham Clinton" again in official materials as secretary of state. As of the 2015 launch of her second presidential campaign, she again switched to using "Hillary Clinton" in campaign materials; in November 2015 both the Associated Press and The New York Times noted that they would no longer use "Rodham" in referring to Clinton, with the Times stating that "the Clinton campaign confirmed ... that Mrs. Clinton prefers to be simply, 'Hillary Clinton'".) She was the first in this role to have a postgraduate degree and her own professional career up to the time of entering the White House. She was also the first to have an office in the West Wing of the White House in addition to the usual first lady offices in the East Wing. During the presidential transition, she was part of the innermost circle vetting appointments to the new administration. Her choices filled at least eleven top-level positions and dozens more lower-level ones. After Eleanor Roosevelt, Clinton was regarded as the most openly empowered presidential wife in American history.

Some critics called it inappropriate for the first lady to play a central role in public policy matters. Supporters pointed out that Clinton's role in policy was no different from that of other White House advisors, and that voters had been well aware she would play an active role in her husband's presidency. Bill Clinton's campaign promise of "two for the price of one" led opponents to refer derisively to the Clintons as "co-presidents" or sometimes use the Arkansas label "Billary". The pressures of conflicting ideas about the role of a first lady were enough to send Hillary Clinton into "imaginary discussions" with the also-politically active Eleanor Roosevelt. (Note: The Eleanor Roosevelt "discussions" were first reported in 1996 by The Washington Post writer Bob Woodward; they had begun from the start of Hillary Clinton's time as first lady. Following the Democrats' loss of congressional control in the 1994 elections, Clinton had engaged the services of Human Potential Movement proponent Jean Houston. Houston encouraged Clinton to pursue the Roosevelt connection, and while no psychic techniques were used with Clinton, critics and comics immediately suggested that Clinton was holding séances with Eleanor Roosevelt. The White House stated that this was merely a brainstorming exercise, and a private poll later indicated that most of the public believed these were indeed just imaginary conversations, with the remainder believing that communication with the dead was actually possible. In her 2003 autobiography, Clinton titled an entire chapter "Conversations with Eleanor", and stated that holding "imaginary conversations [is] actually a useful mental exercise to help analyze problems, provided you choose the right person to visualize. Eleanor Roosevelt was ideal.") From the time she came to Washington, Hillary also found refuge in a prayer group of the Fellowship that featured many wives of conservative Washington figures. Triggered in part by the death of her father in April 1993, she publicly sought to find a synthesis of Methodist teachings, liberal religious political philosophy and Tikkun editor Michael Lerner's "politics of meaning" to overcome what she saw as America's "sleeping sickness of the soul"; that would lead to a willingness "to remold society by redefining what it means to be a human being in the twentieth century, moving into a new millennium".

== Health care and other policy initiatives ==
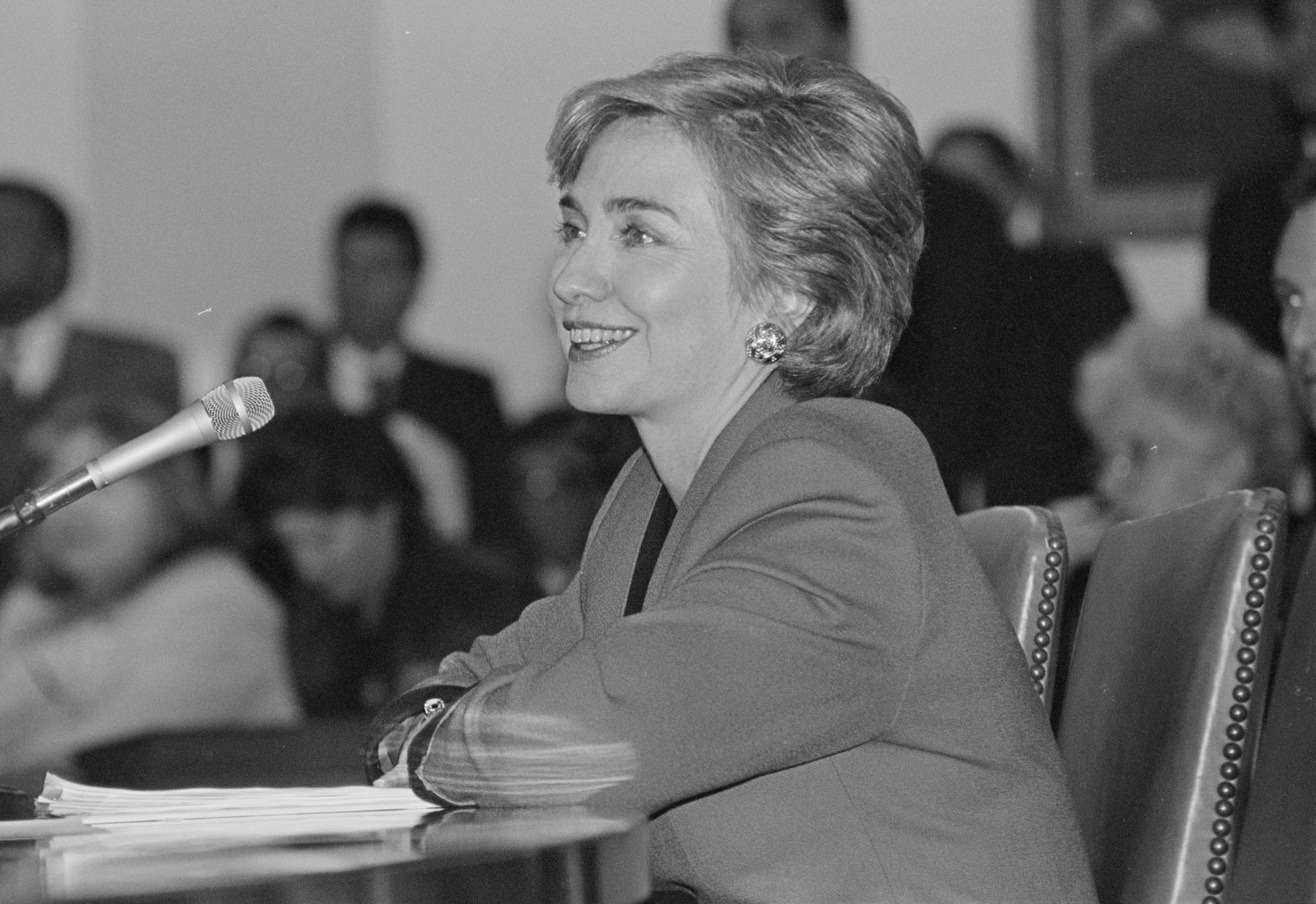
Clinton presenting her health care plan, September 1993

In January 1993, President Clinton named Hillary to chair a task force on National Health Care Reform, hoping to replicate the success she had in leading the effort for Arkansas education reform when she was the first lady of Arkansas. Unconvinced regarding the merits of the North American Free Trade Agreement (NAFTA), she privately urged that passage of health care reform be given higher priority. The recommendation of the task force became known as the Clinton health care plan. This was a comprehensive proposal that would require employers to provide health coverage to their employees through individual health maintenance organizations. Its opponents quickly derided the plan as "Hillarycare" and it even faced opposition from some Democrats in Congress. Some protesters against the proposed plan became vitriolic and during a July 1994 bus tour to rally support for the plan, Clinton wore a bulletproof vest at times.

Failing to gather enough support for a floor vote in either the House or the Senate (although Democrats controlled both chambers), the proposal was abandoned in September 1994. Clinton later acknowledged in her memoir that her political inexperience partly contributed to the defeat but cited many other factors. The first lady's approval ratings, which had generally been in the high-50 percent range during her first year, fell to 44 percent in April 1994 and 35 percent by September 1994.

Republicans made the Clinton health care plan a major campaign issue of the 1994 midterm elections. They saw a net gain of 54 seats in the House election and eight in the Senate election, winning control of both; many analysts and pollsters found the plan to be a major factor in the Democrats' defeat, especially among independent voters. The White House subsequently sought to downplay Clinton's role in shaping policy. Opponents of universal health care would continue to use "Hillarycare" as a pejorative label for similar plans by others.

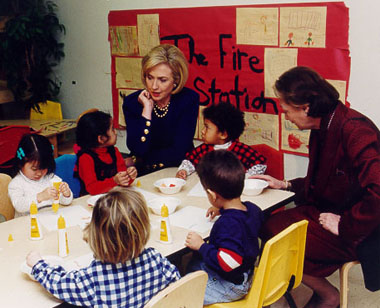
Clinton interacts with children in a classroom

Along with senators Ted Kennedy and Orrin Hatch, Clinton was a force behind the passage of the State Children's Health Insurance Program in 1997. This federal bill gave state support to children whose parents could not provide them health coverage. She conducted outreach efforts on behalf of enrolling children in the program once it became law. She promoted nationwide immunization against childhood diseases and encouraged older women to get a mammogram for breast cancer screening, with coverage provided by Medicare. She successfully sought to increase research funding for prostate cancer and childhood asthma at the National Institutes of Health. She worked to investigate reports of an illness that affected veterans of the Gulf War, which became known as the Gulf War syndrome.

Enactment of welfare reform was a major goal of Bill Clinton's presidency. When the first two bills on the issue came from a Republican-controlled Congress lacking protections for people coming off welfare, however, Hillary urged him to veto the bills, which he did. A third version came up during his 1996 general election campaign that restored some of the protections but cut the scope of benefits in other areas; critics, including her past mentor Edelman, urged her to get the president to veto it again. But she decided to support the bill, which became the Welfare Reform Act of 1996, as the best political compromise available. This caused a rift with Edelman that Hillary later called "sad and painful".

Together with Attorney General Janet Reno, Clinton helped create the Office on Violence Against Women at the Department of Justice. In 1997, she initiated and shepherded the Adoption and Safe Families Act, which she regarded as her greatest accomplishment as the first lady. In 1999, she was instrumental in the passage of the Foster Care Independence Act, which doubled federal monies for teenagers aging out of foster care. As First Lady of the United States, Clinton was the host for various White House conferences. These included one on Child Care (1997), on Early Childhood Development and Learning (1997), and on Children and Adolescents (2000). She also hosted the first-ever White House Conference on Teenagers (2000), and the first-ever White House Conference on Philanthropy (1999).

== International diplomacy and promotion of women's rights ==
Clinton traveled to 79 countries during her time as first lady, breaking the record for most-traveled first lady previously held by Pat Nixon. She did not hold a security clearance or attend National Security Council meetings, but played a role in U.S. diplomacy attaining its objectives. A March 1995 five-nation trip to South Asia, on behest of the U.S. State Department, without her husband, sought to improve relations with India and Pakistan. Clinton was troubled by the plight of women she encountered, but found a warm response from the people of the countries she visited, and gained a better relationship with the American press corps. The trip was a transformative experience for her and presaged her eventual career in diplomacy.

Clinton delivering her "human rights are women's rights and women's rights are human rights" speech in Beijing in September 1995 (20:19)

In a September 1995 speech before the Fourth World Conference on Women in Beijing, Clinton argued forcefully against practices that abused women around the world and in the People's Republic of China itself. She declared, "it is no longer acceptable to discuss women's rights as separate from human rights". Delegates from over 180 countries heard her say: "If there is one message that echoes forth from this conference, let it be that human rights are women's rights and women's rights are human rights, once and for all." In doing so, she resisted both internal administration and Chinese pressure to soften her remarks. The speech became a key moment in the empowerment of women and years later women around the world would recite Clinton's key phrases. During the late 1990s, she was one of the most prominent international figures to speak out against the treatment of Afghan women by the Taliban. She helped create Vital Voices, an international initiative sponsored by the U.S. to encourage the participation of women in the political processes of their countries. It and Clinton's own visits encouraged women to make themselves heard in the Northern Ireland peace process. In 1997, Clinton returned to Northern Ireland to deliver the inaugural Joyce McCartan lecture at the University of Ulster in honour of the community campaigner she had met during her visit in Belfast in 1995.

== Scandals and investigations ==
Clinton was a subject of several investigations by the United States Office of the Independent Counsel, committees of the U.S. Congress, and the press.

The Whitewater controversy was the focus of media attention from its publication in a New York Times report during the 1992 presidential campaign and throughout her time as the first lady. The Clintons had lost their late-1970s investment in the Whitewater Development Corporation; at the same time, their partners in that investment, Jim and Susan McDougal operated Madison Guaranty, a savings and loan institution that retained the legal services of Rose Law Firm and may have been improperly subsidizing Whitewater losses. Madison Guaranty later failed, and Clinton's work at Rose was scrutinized for a possible conflict of interest in representing the bank before state regulators her husband had appointed. She said she had done minimal work for the bank. Independent counsels Robert Fiske and Kenneth Starr subpoenaed Clinton's legal billing records; she said she did not know where they were. After a two-year search, the records were found in the first lady's White House book room and delivered to investigators in early 1996. The delayed appearance of the records sparked intense interest and another investigation concerning how they surfaced and where they had been. Clinton's staff attributed the problem to continual changes in White House storage areas since the move from the Arkansas Governor's Mansion. On January 26, 1996, Clinton became the first spouse of a U.S. president to be subpoenaed to testify before a federal grand jury. After several Independent Counsels had investigated, a final report was issued in 2000 that stated there was insufficient evidence that either Clinton had engaged in criminal wrongdoing.

Scrutiny of the May 1993 firings of the White House Travel Office employees, an action that became known as "Travelgate", began with charges that the White House had used audited financial irregularities in the Travel Office operation as an excuse to replace the staff with friends from Arkansas. The 1996 discovery of a two-year-old White House memo led to the investigation being focused on whether Clinton had orchestrated the firings and whether the statements she made to investigators about her role in the firings were true. The 2000 final Independent Counsel report concluded she was involved in the firings and that she had made "factually false" statements, but that there was insufficient evidence that she knew the statements were false or knew that her actions would lead to firings, to prosecute her.

In March 1994, newspaper reports revealed that Clinton had earned spectacular profits from cattle futures trading in 1978–79. The press made allegations that Clinton had engaged in a conflict of interest and disguised a bribery. Several individuals analyzed her trading records, but no formal investigation was made and she was never charged with any wrongdoing.

An outgrowth of the "Travelgate" investigation was the June 1996 discovery of improper White House access to hundreds of FBI background reports on former Republican White House employees, an affair that some called "Filegate". Accusations were made that Clinton had requested these files and she had recommended hiring an unqualified individual to head the White House Security Office. The 2000 final Independent Counsel report found no substantial or credible evidence that Clinton had any role or showed any misconduct in the matter.

In early 2001, a controversy arose over gifts that were sent to the White House; there was a question whether the furnishings were White House property or the Clintons' personal property. During the last year of Bill Clinton's time in office, those gifts were shipped to the Clintons' private residence.

== It Takes a Village release and tour ==
In 1996, Clinton presented a vision for American children in the book It Takes a Village: And Other Lessons Children Teach Us. In January 1996, she went on a ten-city book tour and made numerous television appearances to promote the book, although she was frequently hit with questions about her involvement in the Whitewater and Travelgate controversies. The book spent 18 weeks on the New York Times Best Seller List that year, including three weeks at number one. By 2000, it had sold 450,000 copies in hardcover and another 200,000 in paperback.

Clinton received the Grammy Award for Best Spoken Word Album in 1997 for the book's audio recording.

== Response to Lewinsky scandal ==
In 1998, the Clintons' private concerns became the subject of much speculation when investigations revealed the president had engaged in an extramarital affair with 22-year-old White House intern Monica Lewinsky. Events surrounding the Lewinsky scandal eventually led to the impeachment of the president by the House of Representatives; he was later acquitted by the Senate. When the allegations against her husband were first made public, Hillary Clinton stated that the allegations were part of a "vast right-wing conspiracy". She characterized the Lewinsky charges as the latest in a long, organized, collaborative series of charges by Bill's political enemies (Note: Clinton was referring to the Arkansas Project and its funder Richard Mellon Scaife, Kenneth Starr's connections to Scaife, Regnery Publishing and its connections to Lucianne Goldberg and Linda Tripp, Jerry Falwell, and others.) rather than any wrongdoing by her husband. She later said she had been misled by her husband's initial claims that no affair had taken place. After the evidence of President Clinton's encounters with Lewinsky became incontrovertible, she issued a public statement reaffirming her commitment to their marriage. Privately, she was reported to be furious at him and was unsure if she wanted to remain in the marriage. The White House residence staff noticed a pronounced level of tension between the couple during this period.

Public reaction varied. Women variously admired her strength and poise in private matters that were made public. They sympathized with her as a victim of her husband's insensitive behavior and criticized her as being an enabler to her husband's indiscretions. They also accused her of cynically staying in a failed marriage as a way of keeping or even fostering her own political influence. In the wake of the revelations, her public approval ratings shot upward to around 70 percent, the highest they had ever been. In her 2003 memoir, she would attribute her decision to stay married to "a love that has persisted for decades" and add: "No one understands me better and no one can make me laugh the way Bill does. Even after all these years, he is still the most interesting, energizing, and fully alive person I have ever met."

Issues that surrounded the Lewinsky scandal left Bill Clinton with substantial legal bills. In 2014, Hillary said that she and Bill had left the White House "not only dead broke, but in debt". The statement may have been literally accurate but ignored the potentially enormous earning power of ex-presidents who give paid speeches after leaving office. The couple would also have the ability to secure loans from banks.

In October 2018, Hillary stated in an interview on CBS News Sunday Morning that Bill was right to not resign from office, and that Bill's affair with Lewinsky did not constitute an abuse of power because Lewinsky "was an adult".

== Other books and initiatives ==
Other books published by Clinton when she was the first lady include Dear Socks, Dear Buddy: Kids' Letters to the First Pets (1998) and An Invitation to the White House: At Home with History (2000). In 2001, she wrote an afterword to the children's book Beatrice's Goat. She was the founding chair of Save America's Treasures, a nationwide effort matching federal funds with private donations to preserve and restore historic items and sites. This included the flag that inspired "The Star-Spangled Banner" and the First Ladies National Historic Site in Canton, Ohio. She also published a weekly syndicated newspaper column titled "Talking It Over" from 1995 to 2000. It focused on her experiences and those of women, children and families she met during her travels around the world.

Near the end of her tenure, publisher Simon & Schuster paid Clinton a near-record advance of $8 million in December 2000 for her autobiography. The book was released in 2003, as Living History.

== Traditional duties ==
Clinton was the head of the White House Millennium Council and hosted Millennium Evenings, a series of lectures that discussed futures studies, one of which became the first live simultaneous webcast from the White House. Clinton also created the first White House Sculpture Garden, located in the Jacqueline Kennedy Garden, which displayed large contemporary American works of art loaned by museums.

In the White House, Clinton placed donated handicrafts of contemporary American artisans, such as pottery and glassware, on rotating display in the state rooms. She oversaw the restoration of the Blue Room to be historically authentic to the period of James Monroe, and the Map Room to how it looked during World War II. Working with Arkansas interior decorator Kaki Hockersmith over an eight-year period, she oversaw extensive, privately funded redecoration efforts around the building, often trying to make it look brighter. These included changing of the Treaty Room and a presidential study to have a 19th-century look. Overall the redecoration brought mixed notices, with Victorian furnishings for the Lincoln Sitting Room being criticized the most. Clinton hosted many large-scale events at the White House, including a state dinner for visiting Chinese dignitaries, a New Year's Eve celebration at the turn of the 21st century, and a state dinner honoring the bicentennial of the White House in November 2000.

== Role during the president's re-election campaign ==
Despite being regarded as a nationally-polarizing figure, Clinton was a top campaigner on her husband's behalf during his successful re-election bid in 1996.

There was initially internal uncertainty as to whether Clinton should speak at the 1996 Democratic National Convention. Due to her being a polarizing figure, there was some concern that a convention speech might do the campaign more harm than benefit. At the time, Speeches by candidate's spouses had not yet become a standard feature at United States presidential nominating conventions, and Clinton herself had not spoken at the preceding 1992 Democratic National Convention. However, Elizabeth Dole (spouse of Republican presidential Bob Dole) had delivered a well-received speech at the 1996 Republican National Convention, held prior to that year's Democratic gathering. Clinton ultimately spoke at the convention, delivering a speech that touched on the subjects of family and children. Playing off the title of her recent book It Takes a Village, Clinton claimed, "it takes a president who believes not only in the potential of his own child, but of all children; who believes not only in the strength of his own family, but of the American family. It takes Bill Clinton."

== United States Senate campaign ==
Results of the 2000 United States Senate election in New York. Clinton won the counties in blue.

When New York's long-serving U.S. senator Daniel Patrick Moynihan announced his retirement in November 1998, several prominent Democratic figures, including Representative Charles Rangel of New York, urged Clinton to run for his open seat in the Senate election of 2000. Once she decided to run, the Clintons purchased a home at 15 Old House Lane in Chappaqua, New York, north of New York City, in September 1999. She became the first wife of the president of the United States to be a candidate for elected office. Initially, Clinton expected to face Rudy Giuliani—the mayor of New York City—as her Republican opponent in the election. Giuliani withdrew from the race in May 2000 after being diagnosed with prostate cancer and matters related to his failing marriage became public. Clinton then faced Rick Lazio, a Republican member of the U.S. House of Representatives who represented New York's 2nd congressional district. Throughout the campaign, opponents accused Clinton of carpetbagging, because she had never resided in New York State or participated in the state's politics before the 2000 Senate race.

The contest drew national attention. Clinton and Lazio's campaigns, along with Giuliani's initial effort, spent a record combined $90 million. Clinton won the election on November 7, 2000, with 55 percent of the vote to Lazio's 43 percent.

== Beginning of Senate tenure ==
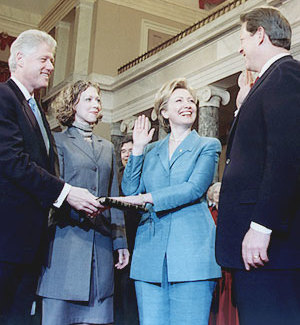
Reenactment of Hillary Rodham Clinton's swearing-in as a U.S. senator by Vice President Al Gore in the Old Senate Chamber, as Bill and Chelsea look on

Clinton was sworn in as U.S. senator on January 3, 2001. As the end of her husband's presidency was still 17 days away, this meant from January 3–20, Clinton simultaneously held the titles of First Lady and Senator – a first in U.S. history.

== Public opinion ==
Clinton has often been described in the popular media as a polarizing figure, with some arguing otherwise.

Northern Illinois University political science professor Barbara Burrell's 2000 study found that Clinton's Gallup poll favorability numbers broke sharply along partisan lines throughout her time as first lady, with 70 to 90 percent of Democrats typically viewing her favorably while only 20 to 40 percent of Republicans did. McGill University professor of history Gil Troy titled his 2006 biography of her Hillary Rodham Clinton: Polarizing First Lady and wrote that after the 1992 campaign, Clinton "was a polarizing figure, with 42 percent [of the public] saying she came closer to their values and lifestyle than previous first ladies and 41 percent disagreeing." Troy further wrote that Clinton "has been uniquely controversial and contradictory since she first appeared on the national radar screen in 1992" and that she "has alternately fascinated, bedeviled, bewitched and appalled Americans."

Gallup polling showed Hillary to be controversial, with her lowest approval ratings coming amid the failure of her healthcare plan and her highest approval ratings coming following the Lewinsky scandal. Opinion of her Clinton was also closely divided in these polls during her 2000 Senate campaign.

At the time that she left office, Clinton was the least-popular first lady ever polled. She left office with a final approval rating of 52% and a final disapproval rating of 39%. No first lady was more unpopular than Clinton until Melania Trump.

== Historical assessments ==
Since 1982 Siena College Research Institute has conducted occasional surveys asking historians to assess American first ladies according to a cumulative score on the independent criteria of their background, value to the country, intelligence, courage, accomplishments, integrity, leadership, being their own women, public image, and value to the president. Clinton has been consistently ranked in the top-6 on each of the surveys since she became First Lady. In terms of cumulative assessment, Clinton has been ranked:

- 2nd-best of 37 in 1993
- 5th-best of 38 in 2003
- 4th-best of 38 in 2008
- 6th-best of 39 in 2014
- 8th-best of 40 in 2020

The only later-serving first lady to (as of yet) be ranked higher overall than Clinton in the Siena surveys is Michelle Obama, who has been ranked higher than Clinton in each of the two surveys that she has been included in (2014 and 2020). In the 2003 survey, Clinton was ranked 3rd in background, 2nd in intelligence, 2nd in being her "own woman", 4th in accomplishments, and 3rd in leadership. In the 2008 survey, Clinton was ranked 4th in background, 3rd in intelligence, 2nd in being her "own woman", 2nd in accomplishments, 4th in courage, 3rd in leadership, and 5th in value to the president. In the 2014 survey, Clinton and her husband were ranked the 21st-highest out of 39 first couples in terms of being a "power couple". In additional questions added to the 2014 survey, historians ranked Clinton among f 20th and 21st century first ladies 2nd in her advancement of women's issues, the 2nd greatest in terms of being a political asset, the 2nd strongest public communicator, 2nd greatest in terms of service performed after leaving the role of first lady, and the third greatest in terms of creating a lasting legacy. It also found her to be the 20th and 21st century first lady that historians could most imagine serving as president herself. In the most recent survey (conducted in 2020), Clinton was ranked 4th most favorably in background, 8th most favorably in value to the country, 7th most favorably in leadership, 14th most favorably for her role as steward of the White House, 4th most favorably in being her "own woman", 4th most favorably in accomplishments, 7th most favorably in public images, and 9th most favorably in her value to the president, while receiving a lower ranking (21st) for integrity. In an additional questions that were asked of participants in the 2020 survey (beyond the questions that were weighed in the overall rankings), among 20th and 21st century first ladies Clinton was ranked third-best as a public communicator, third-best as a political asset to the president, fourth-best in terms of having created a lasting legacy, second-best (behind only Eleanor Roosevelt) for advancing women's issues, and was additionally ranked as the first lady that historians could most imagine having served as president herself. In another supplementary question, Clinton's healthcare reform effort was ranked as 8th-most effective among signature initiatives of the ten first ladies between 1964 and 2020.

In 2021, Zogby Analytics conducted a poll in which a sample of the American public was asked to assess the greatness of twelve First Ladies from Jacqueline Kennedy onwards. The American public ranked Clinton only the tenth-greatest of the twelve first ladies assessed.

== See also ==
- State dinners hosted by the Clintons
- Presidency of Bill Clinton
- Hillary Clinton's tenures as First Lady of Arkansas
- US Senate career of Hillary Clinton
- Hillary Clinton's tenure as Secretary of State
- Legal career of Hillary Clinton
- Hillary Clinton's career in corporate governance
- Activities of Hillary Clinton subsequent to 2016
