= Activities of Hillary Clinton subsequent to 2016 =

Activities of American politician

Following her 2016 U.S. presidential election loss, Hillary Clinton, former Secretary of State and Democratic nominee, remained active in politics, writing, and advocacy. She published What Happened (2017), a memoir detailing her campaign and election defeat, and later co-authored The Book of Gutsy Women (2019) and the political thriller State of Terror (2021).

Clinton continued to engage in Democratic Party politics, endorsing candidates and commenting on national and international issues. She launched Onward Together, a political action organization supporting progressive groups, and remained involved in initiatives related to women's rights, democracy, and foreign policy.

In 2023, she joined Columbia University as a professor in the School of International and Public Affairs.

== Writing career ==
=== Books ===
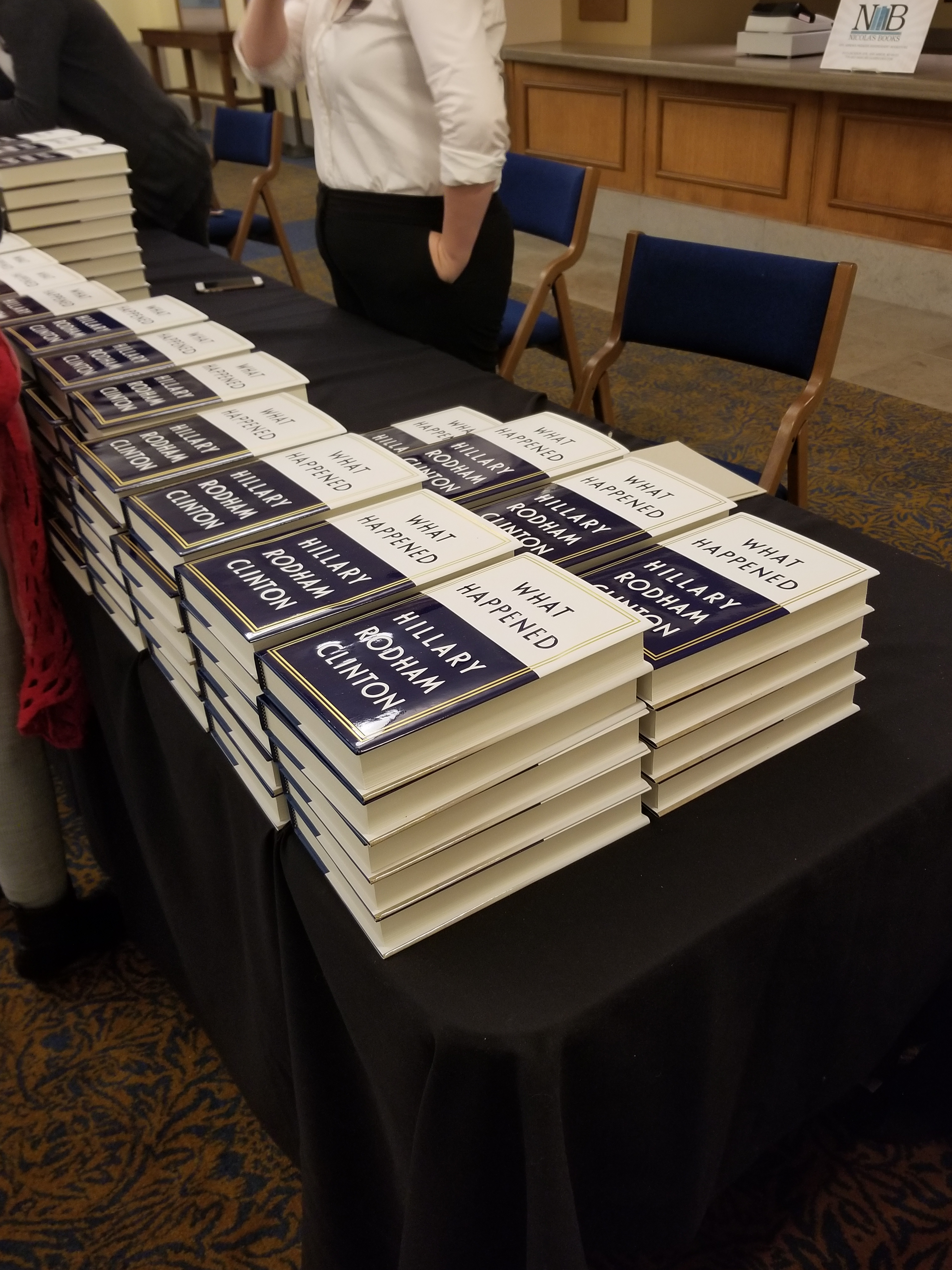
Copies of What Happened at an event on Clinton's book tour promoting the memoir

Clinton's third memoir, What Happened, an account of her loss in the 2016 election, was released on September 12, 2017. A book tour and a series of interviews and personal appearances were arranged for the launch. What Happened sold 300,000 copies in its first week, fewer than her 2003 memoir, Living History, but triple the first-week sales of her previous memoir, 2014's Hard Choices. Simon & Schuster announced that What Happened had sold more e-books in its first-week than any nonfiction e-book since 2010. As of December 10, 2017, the book had sold 448,947 hardcover copies.

An announcement was made in February 2017 that efforts were under way to render her 1996 book It Takes a Village as a picture book. Marla Frazee, a two-time winner of the Caldecott Medal, was announced as the illustrator. Clinton had worked on it with Frazee during her 2016 presidential election campaign. The result was published on the same day of publication of What Happened. The book is aimed at preschool-aged children, although a few messages are more likely better understood by adults.

In October 2019, The Book of Gutsy Women: Favorite Stories of Courage and Resilience, a book Clinton co-wrote with her daughter Chelsea, was published. In February 2021, Clinton announced that she was co-writing her first fiction book with Louise Penny. The book, a political mystery thriller, is titled State of Terror and was released in October 2021.

=== Op-eds ===
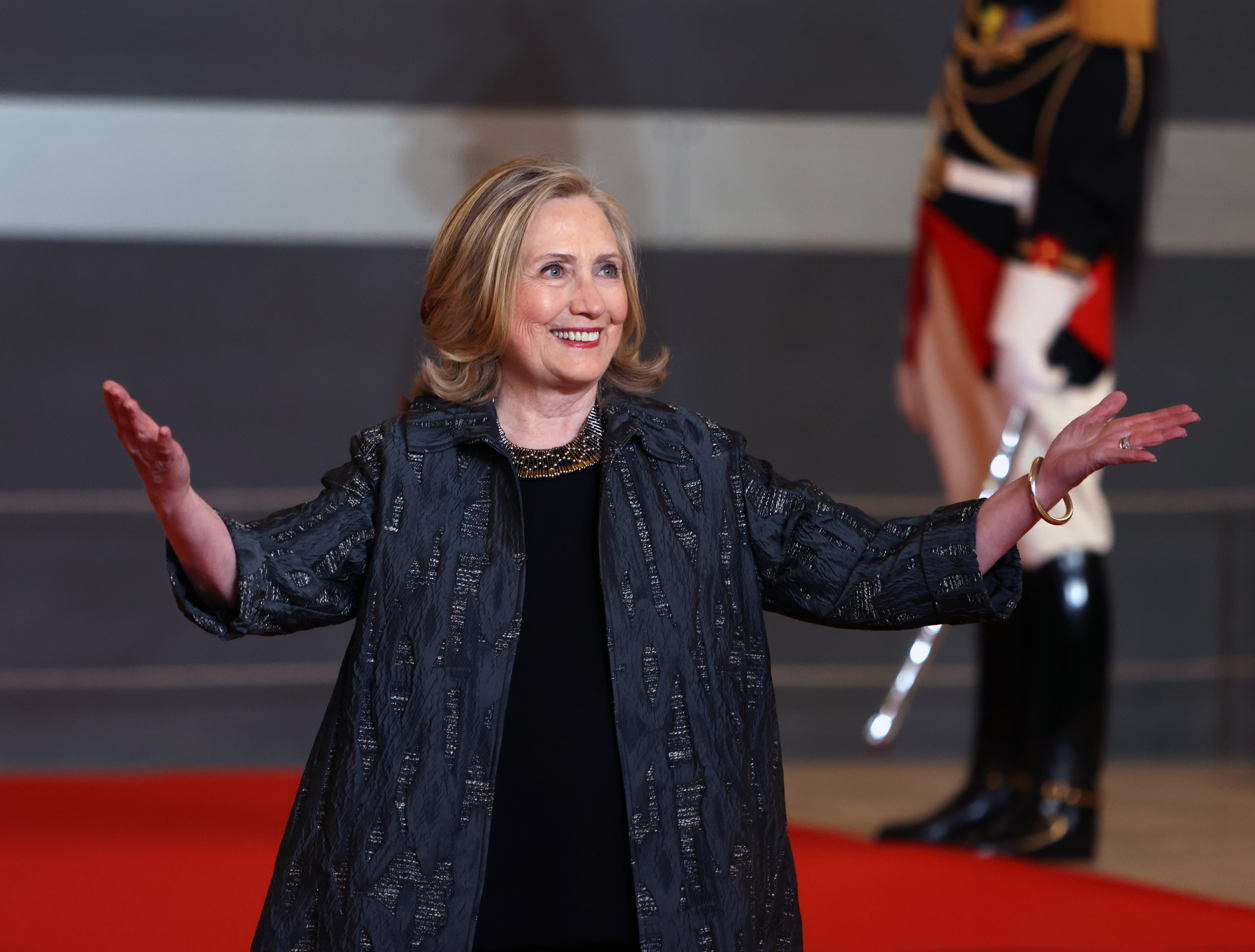
Clinton in the June 2021 Generation Equality Forum in Paris

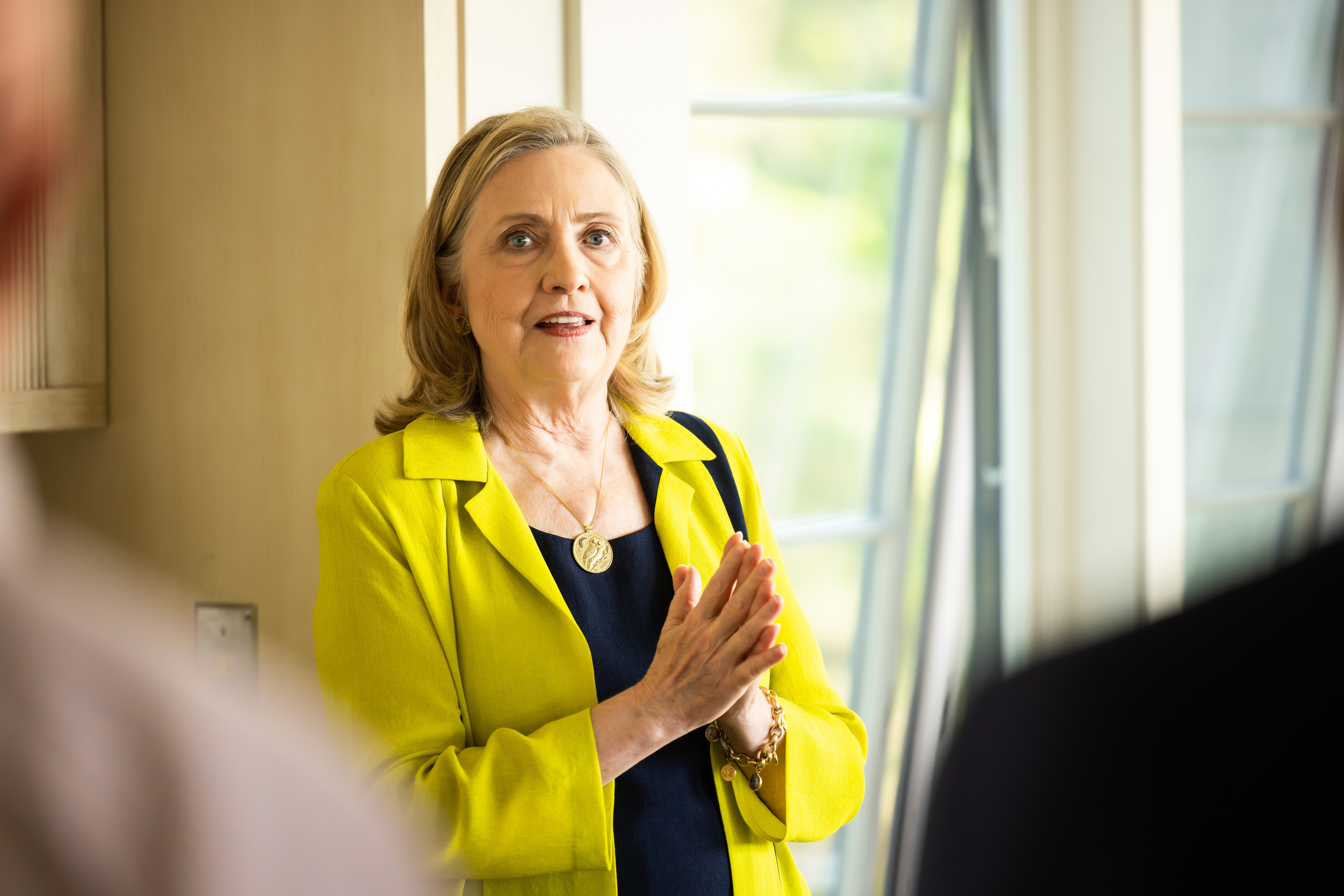
Clinton speaking in 2022

Clinton has written occasional op-eds in the years since her 2016 election defeat:

- September 2018: The Atlantic published an article written by Clinton titled "American Democracy Is In Crisis".
- April 2019: The Washington Post published an op-ed by Clinton calling for congress to be, "deliberate, fair, and fearless" in responding to the Mueller Report.
- Winter 2020: In their November/December 2020 issue, Foreign Affairs published a piece by Clinton titled "A National Security Reckoning".
- January 2021: five days after the January 6 storming of the United States Capitol, The Washington Post published an op-ed by Clinton titled "Trump should be impeached. But that alone won't remove white supremacy from America."
- July 2021: Democracy Docket published an op-ed by Clinton on Republican efforts to restrict voting following the 2020 presidential election.
- February 2022: The Atlantic published an op-ed coauthored by Clinton and Dan Schwerin accusing Republicans of assisting Russian president Vladimir Putin and Chinese president Xi Jinping's goals "by attacking the rule of law."
- March 2022: after the death of former secretary of state Madeleine Albright, The New York Times published a guest opinion essay by Clinton on Albright's vision.
- April 2023: The New York Times published an op-ed by Clinton which faulted Republicans for the 2023 United States debt-ceiling crisis, and characterized their actions as directly benefiting the interests of Russian president Vladimir Putin and Chinese president Xi Jinping.
- August 2023, The Atlantic published an op-ed by Clinton that opined that loneliness and loss of social connection is causing many citizens to decrease their civic engagement.

== Media ventures ==
=== Television and streaming series ===
Clinton collaborated with director Nanette Burstein on the documentary film Hillary, which was released on Hulu in March 2020. In 2022, Apple TV+ released the television series Gutsy, which was created by Clinton and her daughter Chelsea as an offshoot of their book series.

In mid-2018, it was announced that Clinton was slated to serve as an executive producer of a drama series to be created with Steven Spielberg's Amblin Television. The series would depict the fight for women's suffrage in the United States. Titled The Woman's Hour, it was to be based upon Elaine Weiss' book of the same name, which Amblin had optioned. Plans were to have the program carried on either a premium cable channel or streaming media service. In late-2020, it was announced that the series had been picked-up by The CW. As of 2024, the series had not yet been filmed.

=== Other ventures ===
On September 29, 2020, Clinton launched an interview podcast in collaboration with iHeartRadio titled You and Me Both. Clinton's pre-recorded voice was featured in a 2022 stage production of Into the Woods staged at the Arkansas Repertory Theatre for the role of the Giantess. Clinton had a one night cameo in the January 2024 Broadway musical Gutenberg! The Musical!. Clinton is a producer of the 2024 Broadway production of Suffs, a musical which focuses on suffragists and suffragettes. Other producers include Jill Furman, Rachel Sussman, and Nobel Peace Prize Laureate Malala Yousafzai.

== Academics ==
=== Chancellor of Queen's University Belfast (2020–present) ===
On January 2, 2020, it was announced that Clinton would take up the position of Chancellor at Queen's University Belfast. Clinton became the 11th and first female chancellor of the university, filling the position that had been vacant since 2018 after the death of her predecessor, Thomas J. Moran. Commenting on taking up the position, she said that "the university is making waves internationally for its research and impact and I am proud to be an ambassador and help grow its reputation for excellence". Queen's Pro-Chancellor Stephen Prenter said that Clinton on her appointment "will be an incredible advocate for Queen's" who can act as an "inspirational role model". However, her inauguration was protested by some students.

In the wake of the Gaza war Queen's University became the target of local activists from the BDS Movement, Students protested during Clinton's winter 2024 visit to the university, leading to four arrests.

=== Professorial career ===
Clinton resumed her professorial career in September 2023, teaching at Columbia University's School of International and Public Affairs as a professor of foreign policy. She had last been a university professor nearly five decades prior when she taught at the University of Arkansas Law School. Clinton's first class as a professor at Columbia is a being co-taught with Keren Yarhi-Milo. Clinton is a professor of practice at the school, as well as a presidential fellow at Columbia World Projects.

== Political activities ==
Clinton delivered a St. Patrick's Day speech in Scranton, Pennsylvania, on March 17, 2017. In it, alluding to reports that she had been seen taking walks in the woods around Chappaqua following her loss in the presidential election, Clinton indicated her readiness to emerge from "the woods" and become politically active again. However, the following month she confirmed she would not seek public office again. She reiterated her comments in March 2019 and stated she would not run for president in 2020.

In May 2017, Clinton announced the formation of Onward Together, a new political action committee that she wrote is "dedicated to advancing the progressive vision that earned nearly 66 million votes in the last election". During 2017, she spoke out on a number of occasions against Republican plans to repeal the Affordable Care Act and replace it with the American Health Care Act, which she called "a disastrous bill" and a "shameful failure of policy & morality by GOP". In response to the Khan Shaykhun chemical attack, Clinton said the U.S. should take out Bashar al-Assad's airfields and thereby "prevent him from being able to use them to bomb innocent people and drop sarin gas on them".

On April 28, 2020, Clinton endorsed the presumptive Democratic nominee, former Vice President Joe Biden, for president in the 2020 election and she addressed the 2020 Democratic National Convention in August. On October 28, 2020, Clinton announced that she was on the 2020 Democratic slate of electors for the state of New York. After Biden and Kamala Harris won New York State, thereby electing the Democratic elector slate, Clinton and her husband served as members of the 2020 United States Electoral College and cast the first of the state's electoral votes for Biden and Harris.

=== Comments on politics during the first Trump administration ===
On May 2, 2017, Clinton said Trump's use of Twitter "doesn't work" when pursuing important negotiations. "Kim Jong Un ... [is] always interested in trying to get Americans to come to negotiate to elevate their status and their position". Negotiations with North Korea should not take place without "a broader strategic framework to try to get China, Japan, Russia, South Korea, to put the kind of pressure on the regime that will finally bring them to the negotiating table with some kind of realistic prospect for change." While delivering the commencement speech at her alma mater Wellesley College on May 26, Clinton asserted President Trump's 2018 budget proposal was "a con" for underfunding domestic programs. On June 1, when President Trump announced the withdrawal of the U.S. from the Paris Agreement, Clinton tweeted that it was a "historic mistake".

On September 29, 2019, in an interview with CBS News Sunday Morning, Clinton described Trump as a "threat" to the country's standing in the world, describing him as a "corrupt human tornado". She also described Trump as an "illegitimate president", despite him having won the 2016 presidential election. While recognizing that she had indeed lost to Trump, she said that she considered him "illegitimate" because she asserted that his election victory had been assisted by voting restrictions in certain states and Russian influence efforts.

=== Comments on politics during the Biden administration ===
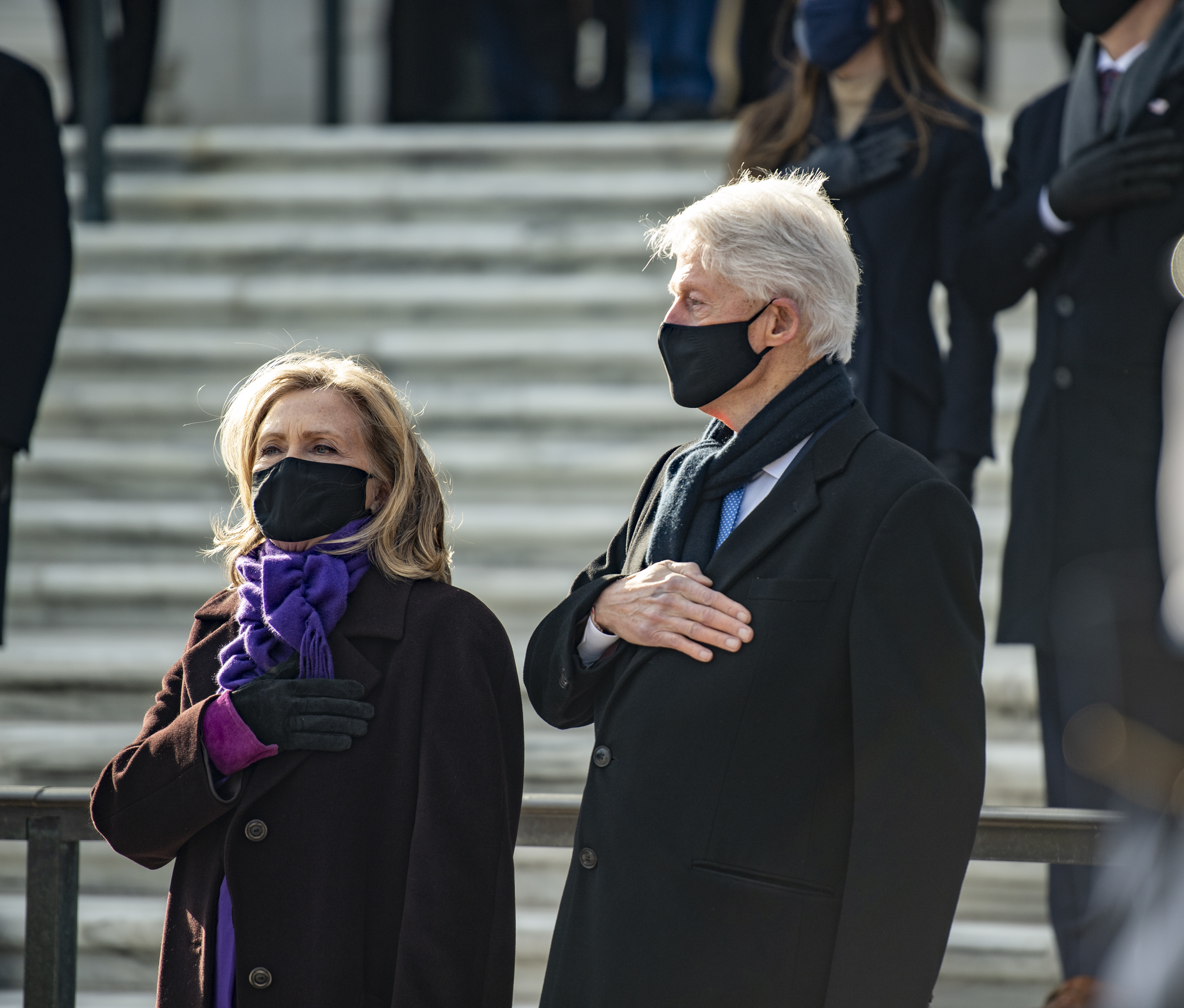
Clinton and her husband attend a wreath laying ceremony at the Tomb of the Unknown Soldier in Arlington National Cemetery after the inauguration of Joe Biden.

In March 2021, Clinton voiced her support for the United States Senate to abolish the Senate filibuster if it proves necessary to do so in order to pass voting rights legislation. Clinton called the Senate filibuster "another Jim Crow relic".

In a May 2021 interview with The Guardian, Clinton called for a "global reckoning" with disinformation, and for the accountability of major social media platforms such as Facebook.

=== Comments on politics during the second Trump administration ===
In June 2026, Clinton wrote an op-ed in the Financial Times endorsing Trump's proposed Gaza reconstruction plan and the Board of Peace.

== Other activities and incidents ==
In October 2017, Clinton was awarded an honorary doctorate from Swansea University, whose College of Law was renamed the Hillary Rodham Clinton School of Law in her honor. In October 2018, Hillary and Bill Clinton announced plans for a 13-city speaking tour in various cities in the United States and Canada between November 2018 and May 2019. Hillary was awarded an Honorary Doctorate in law (LLD) at Queen's University Belfast on October 10, 2018, after giving a speech on Northern Ireland and the impacts of Brexit at Whitla Hall, Belfast. In June 2018, Trinity College Dublin awarded her with an honorary doctorate (LLD). In September 2021 she was awarded an honorary doctorate of civil law by the University of Oxford.

A package that contained a pipe bomb was sent to Clinton's home in New York on October 24, 2018. It was intercepted by the Secret Service. Similar packages were sent to several other Democratic leaders and to CNN.

Clinton praised Muhammad Yunus, leader of the interim government of Bangladesh in April 2025, saying, "Now, Yunus has answered his country’s call once more. As he shepherds Bangladesh out of the shadows of oppression, he is restoring human rights, demanding accountability, and laying the foundations for a just and free society."

== See also ==
- Hillary Clinton's tenure as First Lady of the United States
- US Senate career of Hillary Clinton
- Hillary Clinton's tenure as Secretary of State
- Hillary Clinton's tenures as First Lady of Arkansas
- Legal career of Hillary Clinton
- Hillary Clinton's career in corporate governance
- Post-presidency of Bill Clinton
