= Hillary Clinton as First Lady of Arkansas =

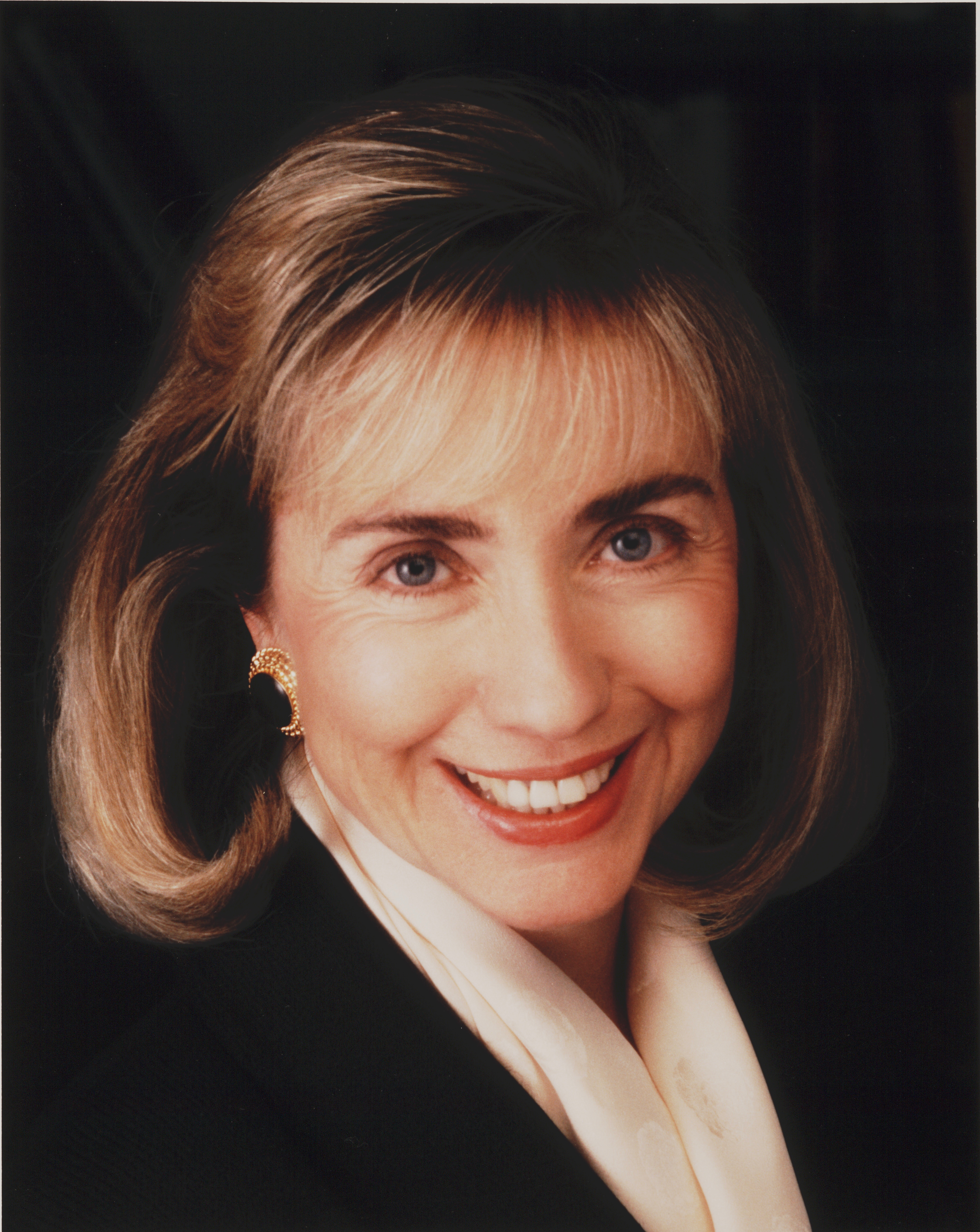
- Clinton in 1992
- Hillary Clinton as First Lady of Arkansas
- Governor: Bill Clinton
- First term January 9, 1979 – January 19, 1981
- Second term January 11, 1983 – December 12, 1992

Hillary Clinton served as first lady of Arkansas during the two governorships of her husband, Bill Clinton. During her husband's first governorship, she was known as Hillary Rodham. However, in his second governorship, she made use of the name Hillary Rodham Clinton.

Clinton took an active role in the state's government, serving on boards and advancing causes and legislation. During her time as first lady of Arkansas, she also continued her legal career at the Rose Law Firm and served on several nonprofits, federal boards, as well as on the corporate boards of directors of Wal-Mart and other companies.

== First tenure (1979–1981) ==
Following her husband's November 1978 election as governor of Arkansas, Hillary Rodham became that state's first lady in January 1979. She would hold that title for twelve nonconsecutive years (1979–81, 1983–92). Her first tenure lasted from January 1979 until January 1981, as her husband lost his bid for reelection in 1980.

=== Unconventionality ===
Clinton (at the time using her maiden name of Rodham) was the first first lady of Arkansas to hold a job during their husband’s governorship. After her husband and her moved to the state capital of Little Rock in 1979, she joined the prestigious Rose Law Firm. In 1979, she was made the first woman to be made a full partner at the prestigious Rose Law Firm. Rodham earned more than her husband did in salary during his tenures as governor. Additionally, during both her husband’s terms as governor, she would advise her husband on policy.

She retained use of her birth name Hillary Rodham instead of using her husband’s surname, which was something that her husband’s opponent in the 1978 gubernatorial primary had heavily used as an attack against her husband. The news gave attention to her lack of conformity and to her decision not to use her husband’s surname. The New York Times's profile of the newly-elected Bill Clinton described him as, "married to an ardent feminist, Hillary Rodham, who will certainly be the first First Lady of Arkansas to keep her maiden name." The Arkansas Democrat wrote a profile that reported, "Despite the fact that she keeps her maiden name, the wife of Arkansas’s new governor, Bill Clinton, claims she’s really an old-fashioned girl." Additionally, her cosmetic appearance during her husband’s first term did not conform to societal standards for the state’s first ladies. She dressed in matronly manner, wore her hair in headbands, and wore large glasses.

Early into her husband’s governorship, she appeared on a public-affairs program and was asked about her decision to continue having her own career and to retain her maiden name, which the host argued was a liability because these were "liberal" moves and Arkansas was a conservative state. She answered "Anita Bryant didn’t take her husband’s name either and I don’t think that she has a liberal image." She continued,

I think a lot of people have images that are in no way related to reality. And there’s really not much one can do about that. Someone could come up with an image of either me or my husband, or you, that — if you were to sit down and talk with the person — would dissolve because you’d realize that your image was not in any way reflective of how that person acted or believed.

An occurrence demonstrating skepticism towards Rodham because of her unconventionality saw a reporter ask her “You’re not a native [of Arkansas], you’ve been educated in liberal Eastern universities, you’re less than 40. You don’t have any children. You don’t use your husband’s name. You practice law. Does it concern you that maybe other people feel that you don’t fit the image that we have created for the governor’s wife in Arkansas?". She replied that it did not.

Gay White, who succeeded Hillary as the state's first lady after Bill Clinton's first term as governor, has expressed the belief that Hillary's unconventionally was a factor in Bill Clinton's failure to win his first bid for reelection.

=== Rural Health Advisory Committee ===
In the first year of her husband’s governorship, Rodham was appointed by her husband to be the chair of the Rural Health Advisory Committee. The role of the committee was to work on providing healthcare to the more isolated areas of the state. As chair of this committee, she secured federal funds to expand medical facilities in Arkansas's poorest areas without affecting doctors' fees.

=== Other activities ===
In 1979, Rodham continued engaged in the trading of cattle futures contracts, something she had begun the previous year. An initial $1,000 investment generated nearly $100,000 when she stopped trading after ten months. In 1979, the couple began their ill-fated investment in the Whitewater Development Corporation real estate venture with Jim and Susan McDougal. Both of these became subjects of controversy in the 1990s.

On February 27, 1980, Rodham gave birth to her and Bill Clinton's only child, a daughter whom they named Chelsea.

== Second tenure (1983–1993) ==
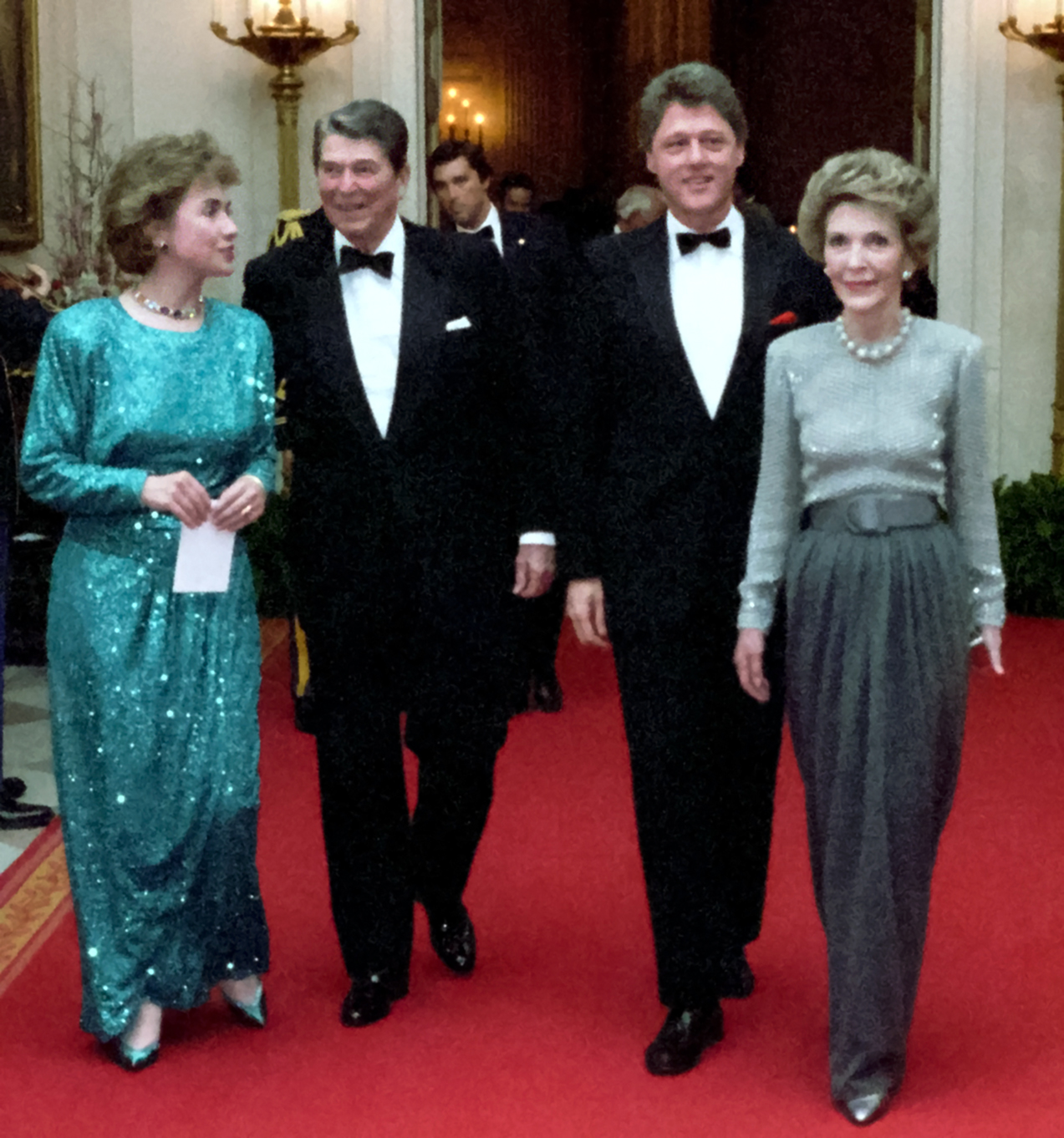
Bill and Hillary Clinton with President Ronald and First Lady Nancy Reagan

Two years after leaving office, Bill Clinton was returned to the governorship of Arkansas after winning the election of 1982. During her husband's campaign, Hillary began to use the name "Hillary Clinton", or sometimes "Mrs. Bill Clinton", to relieve the concerns of Arkansas voters; she also took a leave of absence from Rose Law to campaign for him full-time. During her second stint as the first lady of Arkansas, she made a point of using Hillary Rodham Clinton as her name. (Note: As of 1993, she had not legally changed her name from Hillary Rodham. Bill Clinton's advisers thought her use of her maiden name to be one of the reasons for his 1980 gubernatorial reelection loss. During the following winter, Vernon Jordan suggested to Hillary Rodham that she start using the name Clinton, and she began to do so publicly with her husband's February 1982 campaign announcement to regain that office. She later wrote, "I learned the hard way that some voters in Arkansas were seriously offended by the fact that I kept my maiden name." Once he was elected again, she made a point of using "Hillary Rodham Clinton" in work she did as First Lady of the state. Once she became first lady of the United States in 1993, she publicly stated that she wanted to be known as "Hillary Rodham Clinton". She has authored all her books under that name. She continued to use that name on her website and elsewhere once she was a U.S. senator. When she ran for president during 2007–08, she used the name "Hillary Clinton" or just "Hillary" in campaign materials. She used "Hillary Rodham Clinton" again in official materials as secretary of state. As of the 2015 launch of her second presidential campaign, she again switched to using "Hillary Clinton" in campaign materials; in November 2015 both the Associated Press and The New York Times noted that they would no longer use "Rodham" in referring to Clinton, with the Times stating that "the Clinton campaign confirmed ... that Mrs. Clinton prefers to be simply, 'Hillary Clinton'".)

During her husband’s 1980 campaign, Clinton also adopted a more traditional appearance than she had previously had, likely also out of a belief that her failure to conform to convention standards for a first lady’s appearance had hurt her husband in his 1980 reelection campaign. This included straightening and coloring her hair and ceasing to wear glasses. Additionally, her speech had, whether deliberate or not, taken on a slight southern accent.

During her stint as the state's first lady, Clinton's own political skills and intellect were noticed. For example, in 1990, columnist Paul Greenberg called Clinton, "a political talent and generational intelligence in her own right."

=== Involvement in education policy ===
Clinton’s husband named her chair of the Arkansas Education Standards Committee in 1983, where she sought to reform the state's court-sanctioned public education system. The committee was tasked with proposing stronger education standards for the state. This was Clinton’s first involvement with a high-profile government public policy initiative.

In developing their proposal, different members of the committee traveled to different parts of the state in July 1983, together holding hearings in all of the state’s 75 counties. Input was received from more than 7,500 Arkansas residents. Recommendations made by the committee included adopting greater accountability in the schools; adopting uniformity in core curriculum; administering standardized tests to third, sixth and eighth graders; extending the school years; decreasing class sizes; and making classes more intensive.

In one of the most important initiatives of her husband’s governorship, Clinton fought a prolonged but ultimately successful battle against the Arkansas Education Association to establish mandatory teacher testing and state standards for curriculum and classroom size. It served as an introduction for Clinton to the politics of a highly visible public policy effort. In 1985, she introduced Arkansas's Home Instruction Program for Preschool Youth (HIPPY) a program that helps parents work with their children in preschool preparedness and literacy. Modeled after an Israeli program, it trained low-income parents on reading and on how to educate their kids on basic skills. By 1991, the program was serving 4,500 low-income families.

=== Other activities ===
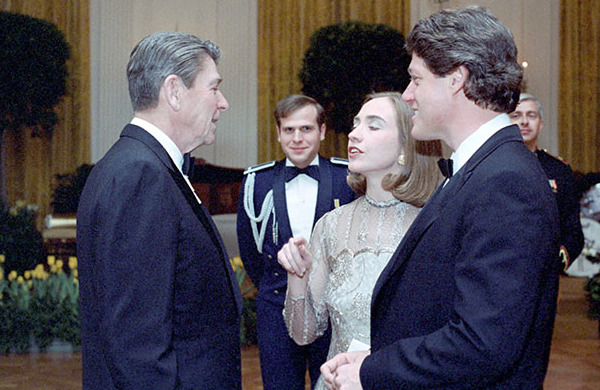
Clinton (second from right) and her husband (far right) speak to President Ronald Reagan at a 1983 White House dinner honoring state governors

In the summer of 1992, Clinton unveiled a program aiming to decrease the state's infant mortality rate by helping to provide prenatal checkups to pregnant individuals.

Clinton continued to practice law with the Rose Law Firm while she was the first lady of Arkansas. Bill Clinton's Republican opponent in his 1986 gubernatorial reelection campaign accused the Clintons of conflict of interest because Rose Law did state business; the Clintons countered the charge by saying that state fees were walled off by the firm before her profits were calculated.

One of the numerous activities Clinton took part in addition to being first lady of Arkansas was serving from 1982 until 1988 on the board of directors of the New World Foundation. The foundation funded a variety of New Left interest groups. Clinton served as the board's president for a portion of her time on it. From 1987 to 1991, Clinton was the first chair of the American Bar Association's Commission on Women in the Profession, created to address gender bias in the legal profession and induce the association to adopt measures to combat it. Clinton was also chairman of the board of the Children's Defense Fund. She was additionally on the board of the Arkansas Children's Hospital's Legal Services from 1988 until 1992 In addition to her positions with nonprofit organizations, she also held positions on the corporate board of directors of TCBY (1985–92), Wal-Mart Stores (1986–92) and Lafarge (1990–92).

Clinton was named Arkansas Woman of the Year in 1983 and Arkansas Mother of the Year in 1984.

When Bill Clinton thought about not running again for governor in 1990, Hillary considered running. Private polls were unfavorable, however, and in the end he ran and was reelected for what was ultimately final term as governor.

== See also ==
- Legal career of Hillary Clinton
- Governorships of Bill Clinton
- Hillary Clinton's tenure as First Lady of the United States
- US Senate career of Hillary Clinton
- Hillary Clinton's tenure as Secretary of State
- Activities of Hillary Clinton subsequent to 2016
