= David Helfenbein =

American communication expert

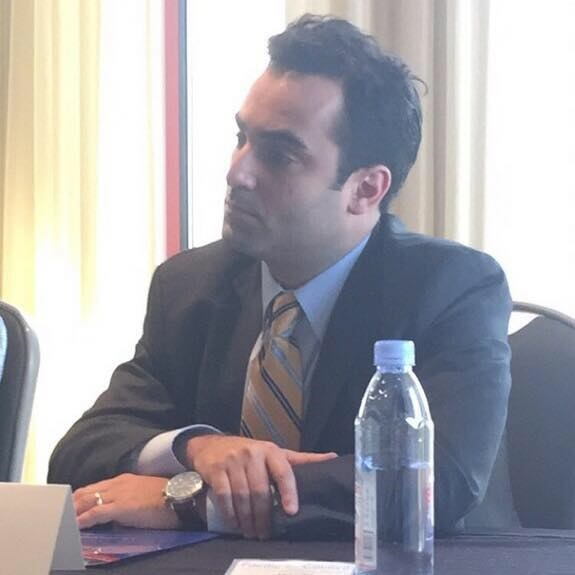
- Born: August 1, 1986 (age 40)
- Education: University of Pennsylvania (B.A.) Washington University in St. Louis (J.D.)
- Occupation: Strategic communications
- Website: Official website

David Helfenbein (born August 1, 1986) is a strategic communication expert focused on public affairs and crisis communication and a former staffer for Secretary Hillary Clinton.

== Early life and education ==
Helfenbein graduated from the University of Pennsylvania where he double majored in political science and communication and public service. He was also educated at Washington University School of Law. His college thesis, entitled "Political Polarization in America, Through the Eyes of a President," included an interview with Ambassador Jon Huntsman Jr. and former President Bill Clinton, among others.

== Career ==
At age 21, he was featured in The New York Times for working for Clinton for 8 years, from the time when he started "Kids 4 Hillary" at age 13. He first met Clinton while attending Robert E. Bell Middle School in Chappaqua, New York where the Clintons had recently moved. He later talked his way into a meeting with her where he offered to work on her Senate campaign. After founding Kids 4 Hillary, he would later work for Clinton in capacities of Senate page, intern, and staff member.

In 2015, Politico mentioned him in a story about "The 11 gushiest emails in Hillary's inbox," where, in an email, he thanked Clinton for "Not only the mentorship and guidance but the continuous opportunities to learn." He is the former host of The Gaggle Podcast.
