= Amanda Litman =

American political activist (born 1990)

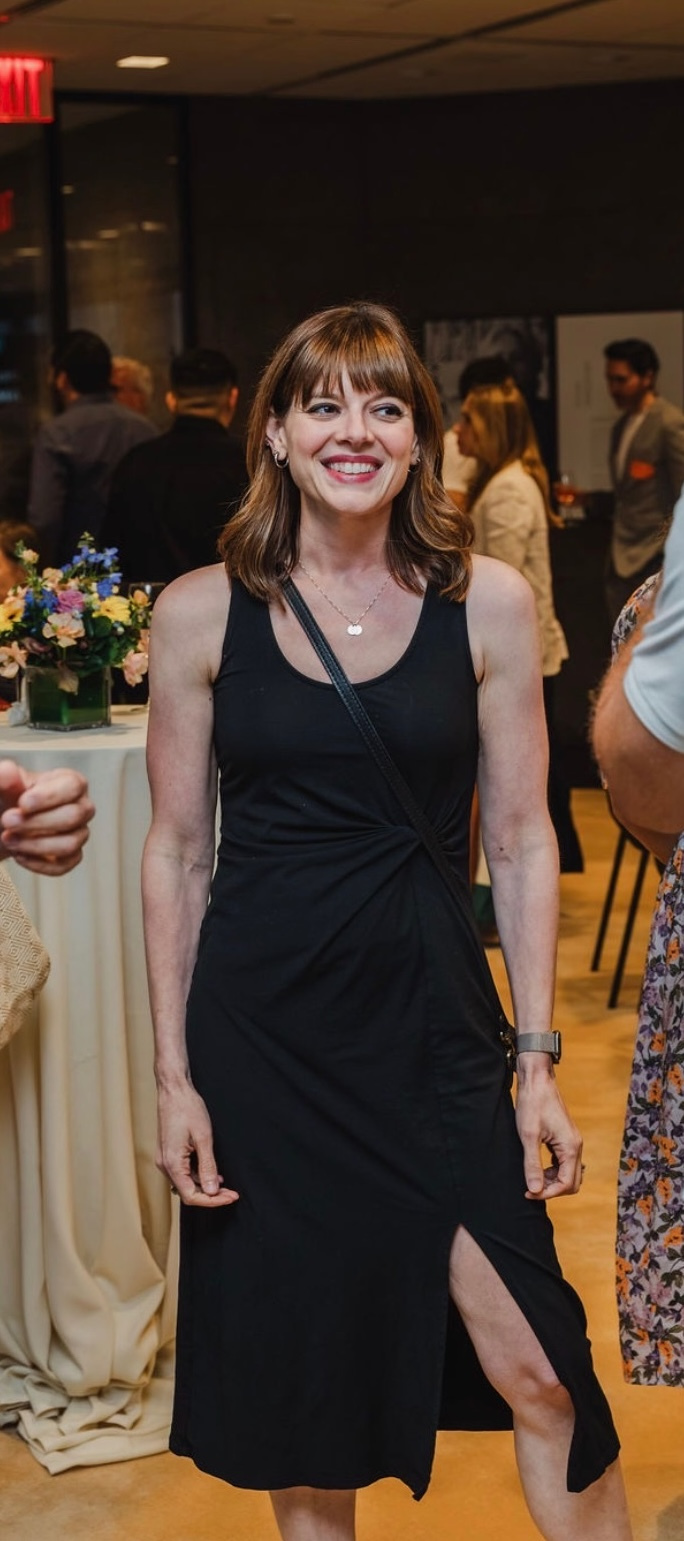
- Amanda Litman at Murmuration America at 250 event in 2026
- Born: Amanda Litman; 1990 (age 35–36)
- Education: Northwestern University (BA)
- Occupation: Political activist
- Organization: Run for Something
- Website: www.amandalitman.com

Amanda Litman is an American writer and political organizer. She is the co-founder and president of Run for Something, a political action committee that recruits and supports young progressive candidates for down-ballot office, and the author of Run for Something: A Real-Talk Guide to Fixing the System Yourself (2017) and When We're in Charge: The Next Generation's Guide to Leadership (2025). Before founding Run for Something in 2017, Litman worked as a digital strategist on Democratic campaigns, including as email director for Hillary Clinton's 2016 presidential campaign. Litman has been recognized by Time, Bloomberg Businessweek, Politico, and Fortune for her work in progressive politics. Her writing focuses on generational turnover in American political leadership and business leadership.

== Early life and education ==
Litman was raised in Fairfax, Virginia. She is Jewish. A defining moment in Litman's high school years came when she skipped class to hear Barack Obama speak at a local college. Her decision to attend Northwestern University, in Chicago, was driven by a desire to be near Obama's base of operations, with hopes of one day working for him. She graduated from Northwestern in 2012 with a Bachelor of Arts Degree.

== Career ==
Litman began her career as an intern on Barack Obama's 2012 presidential campaign and was later hired as an email writer. After the campaign, she worked as deputy email director for his nonprofit, Organizing for Action. In 2014, she served as digital director for Charlie Crist's gubernatorial campaign, and in 2016, she was national email director for Hillary Clinton's presidential campaign.

Litman launched Run for Something on January 20, 2017 with cofounder Ross Morales Rocketto. The purpose of the organization is to recruit and support young candidates running for down-ballot office As of 2025, a total of over 250,000 people have reached out to express interest in running for local races. About 25,000 of them have pursued office in 50 states and D.C.

Litman is the author of two books: a guide to running for local office and a leadership book aimed at younger managers. She writes a popular Substack chronicling her political views, book reading, and personal life.

== Personal life ==
Litman is married with two children. She lives in Brooklyn.

== Recognition ==
- Named to Politico's 50 list of the people most influencing American politics in 2018.
- Named one of Bloomberg Businessweek's "Ones to Watch" in 2018.
- Named to Fortune's 40 Under 40 list in 2020.
- Named to Time's TIME100 Next list in 2022.
- Named a Dial Fellow by the Emerson Collective in 2022.
- Named a Obama Foundation USA Leader for 2025–2026.
- Named a 2026 University of Chicago Institute of Politics Pritzker Fellow.

== Selected publications ==
- Litman, Amanda (2017). Run for Something: A Real-Talk Guide to Fixing the System Yourself. Atria Books. ISBN 978-1501180446.
- Litman, Amanda (2025). When We're in Charge: The Next Generation's Guide to Leadership. Zando/Crooked Media Reads. ISBN 978-1638931928.
