= US Senate career of Hillary Clinton =

Overview of Hillary Clinton's United States Senate career

Hillary Rodham Clinton
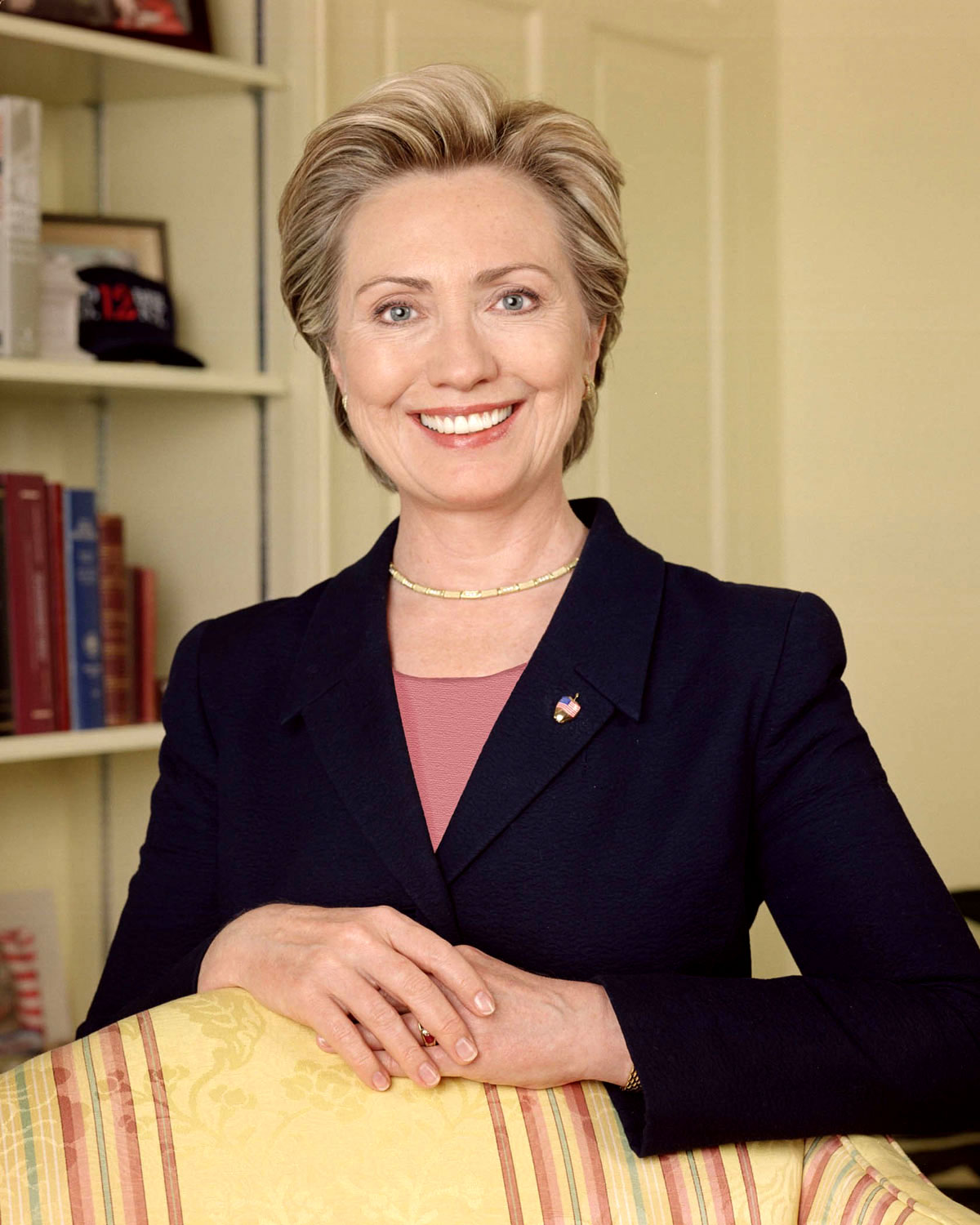

United States Senator from New York
- In office January 3, 2001 – January 21, 2009 Serving with Chuck Schumer
- Elections: 2000; 2006
- Preceded by: Daniel Patrick Moynihan
- Succeeded by: Kirsten Gillibrand

Chairwoman of the Steering and Outreach Committee
- In office January 3, 2003 – January 3, 2007
- Leader: Tom Daschle; Harry Reid
- Preceded by: Office established
- Succeeded by: Debbie Stabenow

Personal details
- Party: Democratic

The United States Senate career of Hillary Rodham Clinton began when she defeated Republican Rick Lazio in the 2000 United States Senate election in New York. She was elected to a second term in 2006. Clinton resigned from the Senate on January 21, 2009, to become United States Secretary of State for the Obama Administration.

Clinton was first elected to the U.S. Senate in 2000, becoming the first female senator from New York and the first First Lady to simultaneously hold elected office. As a senator, she chaired the Senate Democratic Steering and Outreach Committee from 2003 to 2007. She advocated for medical benefits for September 11 first responders. She supported the resolution authorizing the Iraq War in 2002, but opposed the surge of U.S. troops in 2007. Clinton ran for president in 2008, but lost to Barack Obama in the Democratic primaries. She resigned from the Senate to become Obama's secretary of state in 2009.

== First term ==
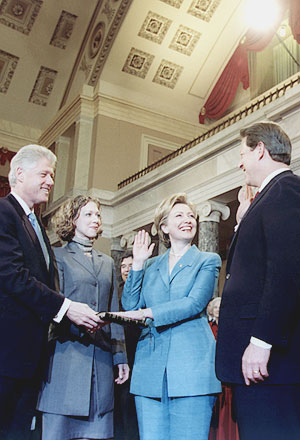
Reenactment of Hillary Rodham Clinton's swearing-in ceremony as a United States Senator by Vice President Al Gore in the Old Senate Chamber, as President Clinton and daughter Chelsea look on, January 3, 2001.

Upon entering the United States Senate, Clinton maintained a low public profile while building relationships with senators from both parties, to avoid the polarizing celebrity she experienced as First Lady (it was reported that when Elizabeth Dole joined the Senate in 2003 under somewhat similar circumstances, she modeled her initial approach after Clinton's, as did the nationally visible Barack Obama in 2005). Clinton also forged alliances with religiously inclined senators by becoming a regular participant in the Senate Prayer Breakfast.

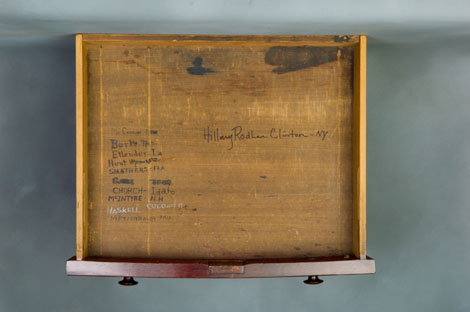
Drawer of chamber desk LXXXVII occupied by Hillary Rodham Clinton in the U.S. Senate. Note signature at center inside of drawer. Chamber desk was once occupied in the U.S. Senate by Al Gore, Sr., father of Al Gore, now used by her successor Kirsten Gillibrand.

Following the September 11, 2001 attacks, Clinton sought to obtain funding for the recovery efforts in New York City and security improvements in her state. Working with New York's senior senator, Charles Schumer, she was instrumental in quickly securing $21.4 billion in funding for the World Trade Center site's redevelopment. Not a favorite of New York City police officers and firefighters who were in attendance, she was audibly booed and heckled at The Concert for New York City on October 20, 2001, although her husband was loudly applauded. Causes included the lack of support from the police and firefighter unions during her 2000 campaign, and her inattentive, possibly disrespectful behavior during Bush's September 20 address to Congress. Hillary Clinton said she did not take the booing personally: "They can blow off steam any way they want to. They've earned it." She subsequently took a leading role in investigating the health issues faced by 9/11 first responders, eventually earning the praise and endorsement of New York City's Uniformed Fire Officers Association and the Uniformed Firefighters Association for her 2006 re-election bid. In 2005, Clinton issued two studies that examined the disbursement of federal homeland security funds to local communities and first responders. Clinton voted for the USA Patriot Act in October 2001. In 2005, when the act was up for renewal, she worked to address some of the civil liberties concerns with it, before voting in favor of a compromise renewed act in March 2006 that gained large majority support.

Clinton strongly supported the 2001 U.S. military action in Afghanistan, saying it was a chance to combat terrorism while improving the lives of Afghan women who suffered under the Taliban government. Clinton voted in favor of the October 2002 Iraq War Resolution, which authorized United States President George W. Bush to use military force against Iraq, should such action be required to enforce a United Nations Security Council Resolution after pursuing with diplomatic efforts (however, Clinton voted against the Levin Amendment to the Resolution, which would have required the President to conduct vigorous diplomacy at the U.N., and would have also required a separate Congressional authorization to unilaterally invade Iraq. She did vote for the Byrd Amendment to the Resolution, which would have limited the Congressional authorization to one year increments, but the only mechanism necessary for the President to renew his mandate without any Congressional oversight was to claim that the Iraq War was vital to national security each year the authorization required renewal). Clinton later said that she did not read the full classified National Intelligence Estimate that was delivered ten days before the vote to all members of Congress, and that gave a more subtle case for Iraq possessing weapons of mass destruction than the Bush Administration's abridged summary, but that she was briefed on the report.

After the Iraq War began, Clinton made trips to both Iraq and Afghanistan to visit American troops stationed there, such as the 10th Mountain Division based in Fort Drum, New York. In spring 2004, Clinton publicly castigated U.S. Deputy Secretary of Defense Paul Wolfowitz at a hearing, saying his credibility was gone due to false predictions he had made before the war's start. On a visit to Iraq in February 2005, Clinton noted that the insurgency had failed to disrupt the democratic elections held earlier, and that parts of the country were functioning well. Noting that war deployments were draining regular and reserve forces, she co-introduced legislation to increase the size of the regular United States Army by 80,000 soldiers to ease the strain. In late 2005, Clinton said that while immediate withdrawal from Iraq would be a mistake, Bush's pledge to stay "until the job is done" was also misguided, as it would give Iraqis "an open-ended invitation not to take care of themselves". She criticized the administration for making poor decisions in the war, but added that it was more important to solve the problems in Iraq. This centrist and somewhat vague stance caused frustration among those in the Democratic party who favored immediate withdrawal.

During her time as senator, Clinton supported retaining and improving health benefits for veterans. She lobbied against the closure of several military bases in New York, including Fort Drum, and visited almost all military installations within the state. She formed strong working relationships with several high-ranking military officers, including General Franklin L. "Buster" Hagenbeck at Fort Drum, who was Commander of the 10th Mountain Division, and General Jack Keane, who was Vice Chief of Staff of the Army. When in 2003 the opportunity opened to take a seat on the Senate Foreign Relations Committee or the Senate Armed Services Committee, she chose the latter, even though past New York senators such as Daniel Patrick Moynihan and Jacob Javits had traditionally been highly visible on the former. Once on the Armed Services Committee, she made a practice of going to every meeting, no matter how obscure the topic. In the words of New York Times reporter Mark Landler, Clinton became "a military wonk"; in part this was to bolster her credentials should she stage a run for president.

Senator Clinton voted against the two major tax cuts packages introduced by President Bush, the Economic Growth and Tax Relief Reconciliation Act of 2001 and the Jobs and Growth Tax Relief Reconciliation Act of 2003, saying it was fiscally irresponsible to reopen the budget deficit. At the 2000 Democratic National Convention, Clinton had called for maintaining a budget surplus to pay down the national debt for future generations. At a fundraiser in 2004, she told a crowd of financial donors that "Many of you are well enough off that ... the tax cuts may have helped you" but that "We're saying that for America to get back on track, we're probably going to cut that short and not give it to you. We're going to take things away from you on behalf of the common good."

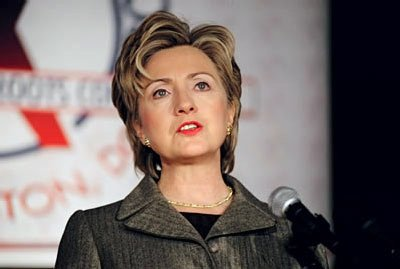
Senator Clinton delivers an address to Families USA, 2005.

In Clinton's first term as senator, New York's jobless rate rose by 0.7 percent after a nationwide recession. The state's manufacturing sector was especially beleaguered, losing about 170,000 jobs. In 2005, Clinton and Senator Lindsey Graham cosponsored the American Manufacturing Trade Action Coalition, which provides incentives and rewards for completely domestic American manufacturing companies. In 2003, Clinton convinced the information technology firm Tata Consultancy Services to open an office in Buffalo, New York, but some criticized the plan because Tata is also involved in the business of outsourcing. In 2004, Clinton co-founded and became the co-chair of the Senate India Caucus with the aid of USINPAC, a political action committee. In 2005, Clinton voted against ratification of the Central America Free Trade Agreement, believing that it did not provide adequate environmental or labor standards. In this she differed with her husband, who supported CAFTA; the ratification was successful.

Senator Clinton led a bipartisan effort to bring broadband access to rural communities. She cosponsored the 21st Century Nanotechnology Research and Development Act, which encourages research and development in the field of nanotechnology. She included language in an energy bill to provide tax exempt bonding authority for environmentally-conscious construction projects, and introduced an amendment that funds job creation to repair, renovate and modernize public schools.

In 2005, Clinton was joined by former House Speaker Newt Gingrich, who once led the Republican opposition to her husband's administration, in support of a proposal for incremental universal health care. She also worked with Bill Frist, the Republican Senate Majority Leader, in support of modernizing medical records with computer technology to reduce human errors, such as misreading prescriptions.

During the 2005 debate over the use of filibusters by Senate Democrats, which prevented some of President Bush's judicial nominations from being confirmed, Clinton was not part of the "Gang of 14", a bipartisan group of senators who would support cloture but oppose the Republican threat to abolish the filibuster. However, she did vote in favor of cloture along with that group, thereby allowing the nominations to come to a vote. She subsequently voted against three of the nominees, but all were confirmed by the Senate. Clinton voted against the confirmation of John Roberts as Chief Justice of the United States, saying "I do not believe that the Judge has presented his views with enough clarity and specificity for me to in good conscience cast a vote on his behalf", but then said she hoped her concerns would prove to be unfounded. Roberts was confirmed by a solid majority, with half the Senate's Democrats voting for him and half against. She joined with about half of the Democratic Senators in support of the filibuster against the nomination of Samuel Alito to the United States Supreme Court, and subsequently voted against his confirmation along with almost all Democratic members of the Senate. On the Senate floor, Clinton said Alito would "roll back decades of progress and roll over when confronted with an administration too willing to flaunt [sic] the rules and looking for a rubber stamp". Alito was confirmed in a vote split largely along party lines.

Clinton sought to establish an independent, bipartisan panel patterned after the 9/11 Commission, an independent commission chaired by former New Jersey governor Thomas Kean, that was charged with investigating the September 11 attacks, to investigate the response to Hurricane Katrina by the federal, state and local governments, but could not obtain the two-thirds majority needed to overcome procedural hurdles in the Senate.

In 2005, Clinton called for the Federal Trade Commission to investigate how hidden sex scenes showed up in the controversial video game Grand Theft Auto: San Andreas. Along with Senators Joe Lieberman and Evan Bayh, she introduced the Family Entertainment Protection Act, intended to protect children from inappropriate content found in video games. Similar bills have been filed in some states such as Michigan and Illinois, but were ruled to be unconstitutional.

In July 2004 and June 2006, Clinton voted against the Federal Marriage Amendment that sought to prohibit same-sex marriage. The proposed constitutional amendment fell well short of passage on both occasions. In June 2006, Clinton voted against the Flag Desecration Amendment, which failed to pass by one vote. Earlier, she attempted to reach a compromise by proposing the Flag Protection Act of 2005, a legislative ban on flag burning (in cases where there was a threat to public safety) that would not require a constitutional amendment, but it was also voted down.

Looking to establish a "progressive infrastructure" to rival that of American conservatism, Clinton played a formative role in conversations that led to the 2003 founding of former Clinton administration chief of staff John Podesta's Center for American Progress; shared aides with Citizens for Responsibility and Ethics in Washington, founded in 2003; advised and nurtured the Clintons' former antagonist David Brock's Media Matters for America, created in 2004; and following the 2004 Senate elections, successfully pushed new Democratic Senate leader Harry Reid to create a Senate war room to handle daily political messaging.

== Second term ==
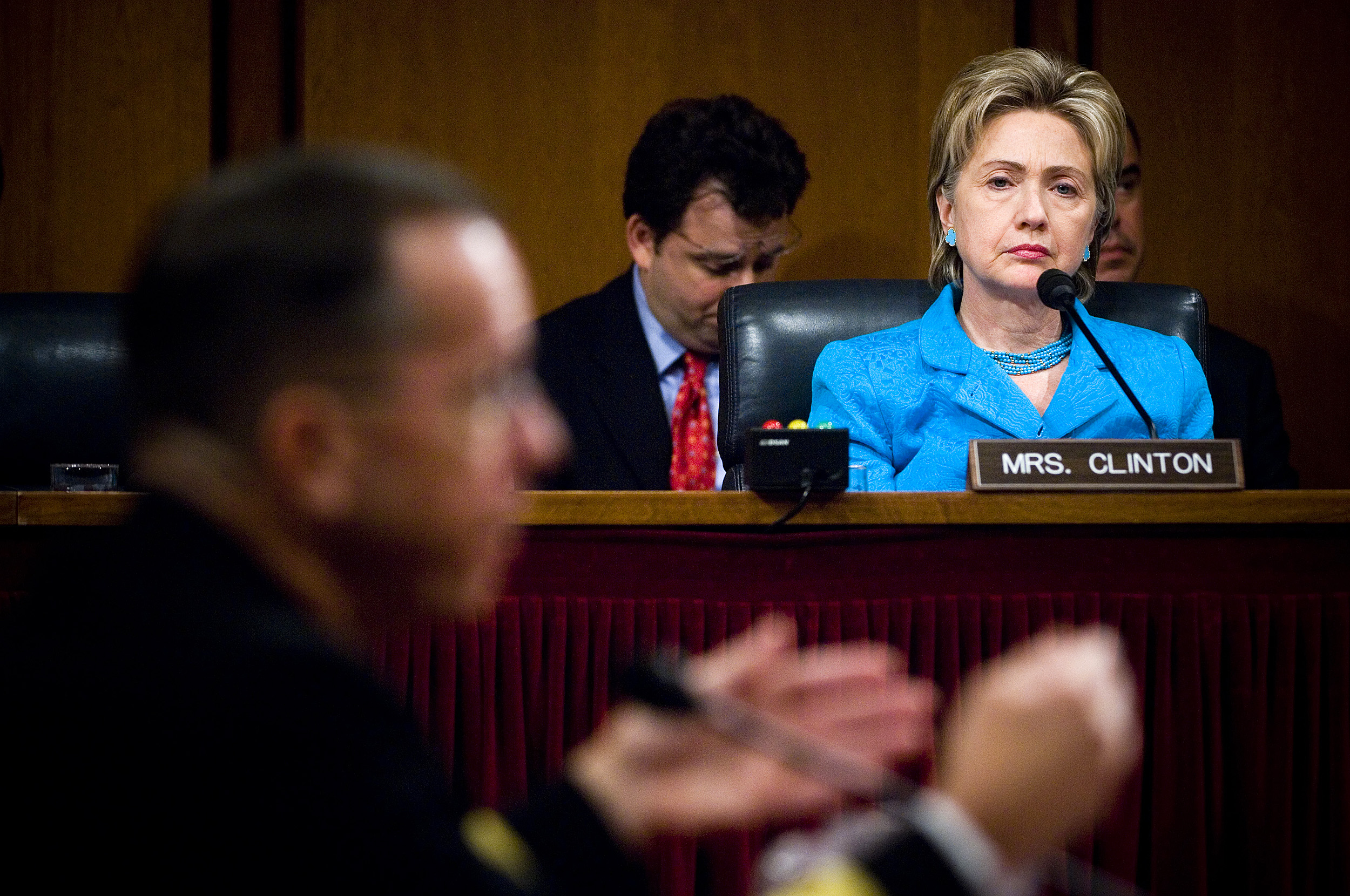
Senator Clinton listens as Chief of Naval Operations Navy Admiral Mike Mullen responds to a question during his July 2007 confirmation hearing in front of the Senate Armed Services Committee.

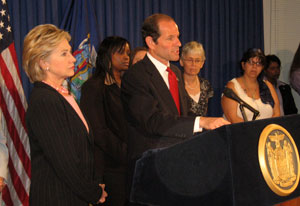
New York Governor Eliot Spitzer and Senator Clinton talk about health care coverage in August 2007.

Clinton opposed the Iraq War troop surge of 2007 and supported a February 2007 non-binding Senate resolution against it, which failed to gain cloture. Her rationale for doing so included reasons both military and domestic political. General Jack Keane, one of the architects of the surge, later related that he tried to convince Clinton of its merits at the time but that she felt it would not succeed and that U.S. casualties would be too high. Keane said that sometime during 2008 she told him, "You were right, this really did work". In 2014, Secretary of Defense Gates related that after Clinton had left the Senate and become Secretary of State, she told President Obama that her opposition to the 2007 Iraq surge had been political, due to her facing a strong challenge from the anti-Iraq War Obama in the upcoming Democratic presidential primary. Gates also quotes Clinton as saying, "The Iraq surge worked". Clinton responded that Gates had misinterpreted her remark regarding the reason for her opposition.

In March 2007 she voted in favor of a war spending bill that required President Bush to begin withdrawing troops from Iraq within a certain deadline; it passed almost completely along party lines but was subsequently vetoed by President Bush. In May 2007 a compromise war funding bill that removed withdrawal deadlines but tied funding to progress benchmarks for the Iraqi government passed the Senate by a vote of 80–14 and would be signed by Bush; Clinton was one of those that voted against it. In August 2007 Clinton, following the lead of Armed Services Committee chair Carl Levin, called on the Iraqi Parliament to replace Nouri al-Maliki as Prime Minister of Iraq with "a less divisive and more unifying figure", saying that Maliki had failed to make progress in bridging differences between the hostile factions within Iraq. Maliki responded angrily to the suggestion, saying "There are American officials who consider Iraq as if it were one of their villages, for example Hillary Clinton and Carl Levin ... This is severe interference in our domestic affairs." Clinton responded to General David Petraeus's September 2007 Report to Congress on the Situation in Iraq by saying, "I think that the reports that you provide to us really require a willing suspension of disbelief". Regarding the concurrent MoveOn.org ad controversy, Clinton voted against a Senate resolution condemning personal attacks on Petraeus, which passed 72–25. In September 2007 she voted in favor of a Senate resolution calling on the State Department to label the Iranian Revolutionary Guard Corps "a foreign terrorist organization", which passed 76–22.

In March 2007, in response to the dismissal of U.S. attorneys controversy, Clinton called on Attorney General Alberto Gonzales to resign. In May 2007, following the Supreme Court's decision in Ledbetter v. Goodyear Tire & Rubber Co. to narrowly interpret the time period in which equal pay discrimination complaints must be filed, Clinton vowed to introduce legislation to statutorily expand this timeframe. In November 2007, following the eventual resignation of Gonzales, Clinton missed the 53–40 vote confirming Michael Mukasey as the new Attorney General, but had earlier said she opposed the nomination.

In May and June 2007, regarding the high-profile, hotly debated comprehensive immigration reform bill known as the Secure Borders, Economic Opportunity and Immigration Reform Act of 2007, Clinton twice voted against amendments that would have derailed the bill, thus moving forward the bill's chance of passage. She introduced a failed amendment to facilitate legal immigrants bringing other family members into the country. After not announcing her position until a week before the vote, she ayed on a cloture motion to bring the overall bill to a vote, which failed. When the bill was again brought forward, she continued to vote in favor of cloture motions to consider it. In October, Clinton voted in favor of a small subset of the failed bill, the DREAM Act, but it too failed to gain cloture.

In October 2007, Clinton signed her name to a request from her and 40 other Democratic senators to Mark P. Mays, head of Clear Channel Communications and affiliate broadcaster of The Rush Limbaugh Show, to repudiate comments made by Rush Limbaugh that referred to certain U.S. servicemen as "phony soldiers".

Clinton has enjoyed high approval ratings for her job as Senator within New York, reaching an all-time high of 72 to 74 percent approving (including half of Republicans) over 23 to 24 percent disapproving in December 2006, before her presidential campaign became active; by August 2007, after a half year of campaigning, it was still 64 percent over 34 percent.

In February 2008, Clinton voted in favor of an expanded version of the economic stimulus package crafted by the House and President Bush. The bill would have added benefits to senior citizens, disabled veterans, and the unemployed, but narrowly failed to break a filibuster. Due to campaigning, Clinton missed the subsequent final vote for the House-Bush version, which passed easily 81–16 and became the Economic Stimulus Act of 2008. A few days later, Clinton also missed a key vote on whether to strip telecommunications company retroactive immunity from a new Foreign Intelligence Surveillance Act update bill, an action that fell well short of passing; she similarly missed the final 68–29 vote on the Act updating.

During General Petraeus's April 2008 testimony before the Armed Services Committee, Clinton said that political progress in Iraq had not matched the security gains brought by the troop surge, that too much of the U.S. military was tied down in Iraq, and that "it's time to begin an orderly process of withdrawing our troops".

On June 24, 2008, Clinton received a warm reception as she returned to the Senate for the first time after the unsuccessful conclusion of her presidential campaign three weeks earlier.

As the 2008 financial crisis reached a peak, Clinton proposed a revival of the New Deal-era Home Owners' Loan Corporation, to help homeowners refinance their mortgages. Writing in a Wall Street Journal op-ed, she said that "This is a sink-or-swim moment for America. We cannot simply catch our breath. We've got to swim for the shores." Regarding the proposed bailout of United States financial system, she initially pronounced the $700 billion rescue plan flawed, but said she would support it. On October 1, 2008, she voted in favor of the Senate legislation, HR1424, saying that it represented the interests of the American people; it passed the Senate 74–25.

Following the November 4, 2008, presidential election and the victory of Clinton's primary rival Barack Obama, Clinton requested a position within the Democratic Senate leadership or as a head of a potential task force to deal with health care reform. Party leaders did not want to dislodge any existing members, however, and no concrete offers came out of the talks, which continued after Obama offered a position in his cabinet to her.

On December 1, 2008, President-elect Barack Obama announced that Clinton would be his nominee for U.S. Secretary of State. Clinton said that "leaving the Senate is very difficult for me" and thanked New Yorkers, "who have for eight years given me the joy of a job I love, with the opportunity to work on issues I care about deeply, in a state that I cherish". Clinton's decision to leave the Senate set off a scramble to determine who Governor of New York David Paterson would name to replace her, and resulted in the brief entry into politics for the first time of Caroline Kennedy.

Later that month, during the automotive industry crisis of 2008, Clinton voted in favor of a $14 billion emergency bailout for U.S. automakers, but it failed to gain the 60 votes needed for cloture.

Confirmation hearings before the Senate Foreign Relations Committee began on January 13, 2009, a week before the Obama inauguration; two days later, the Committee voted 16–1 to approve Clinton. Republican Senator David Vitter of Louisiana was the lone dissenting vote in the committee. In anticipation of her confirmation as the 67th Secretary of State, Clinton attended an emotional farewell party on January 14, where she said that being in the Senate "has been the greatest experience of my life" and that departing was "like leaving family". Clinton cast her last Senate vote on January 15, supporting the release of the second $350 billion for the Troubled Assets Relief Program, a measure which passed 52–42. She gave a final Senate address later that day, spending much of her time thanking her fellow members for their support after the events of September 11 and taking the unusual step of entering all of her staff's names into the Congressional Record. Later that night, she attended the final fundraiser possible to help retire her presidential campaign debt. The Manhattan event featured Jon Bon Jovi, and Clinton said it was a "very nostalgic and bittersweet time"; when she also said it was her last political event, some in the crowd of supporters shouted out "2016".

Following the inauguration of Obama, Clinton's confirmation was not done by voice vote the same day, due to objections from Republican Senator John Cornyn of Texas, who was still concerned about financial disclosure procedures related to Bill Clinton. Clinton was then confirmed as Secretary of State in the Senate by a roll call vote of 94–2 on January 21, 2009. Vitter and Republican Jim DeMint of South Carolina voted against the confirmation. Clinton was administered the oath of office of Secretary of State by longtime friend Judge Kathryn A. Oberly, and resigned from the Senate the same day. On January 23, 2009, New York Governor David Paterson named Congresswoman Kirsten Gillibrand as Clinton's successor.

== Legislation ==
While a member of the U.S. Senate, Clinton sponsored 31 pieces of legislation, including 21 bills, 9 amendments, 33 Senate Resolutions, and 21 concurrent resolutions. Fourteen of her Senate resolutions were passed, expressing the Senate's views on policy or commemorative questions. One of her concurrent resolutions—supporting National Purple Heart Recognition Day—passed both houses. Three became law:

No.	Senate Bill	Congress	Year	Title	Senate Vote Yea/Nay	House Vote Yea/Nay	Purpose	Ref.
1	S. 1241	108th	2004	Kate Mullany National Historic Site Act	Unanimous	Acclamation	Establishes the Kate Mullany National Historic Site in Troy, New York. Authorizes appropriations.	
2	S. 3613	109th	2006	A bill to designate the facility of the United States Postal Service located at 2951 New York Highway 43 in Averill Park, New York, as the "Major George Quamo Post Office Building".	Unanimous	Acclamation	Names post office after Major George Quamo, U.S. Army	
3	S. 3145	110th	2008	A bill to designate a portion of United States Route 20A, located in Orchard Park, New York, as the "Timothy J. Russert Highway"	Unanimous	Acclamation	Named U.S. Route Highway after late journalist Tim Russert	

Taking a different metric used by PolitiFact, in total Clinton introduced 713 pieces of legislation, of which 363 were Senate bills while the balance consisted of amendments or resolutions. In addition Clinton was listed as a co-sponsor on 74 bills that became law.

== Assignments ==
Clinton served on five Senate committees with nine subcommittee assignments:

- Committee on the Budget (2001–2003)
- Committee on Armed Services (2003–2009)
  - Subcommittee on Airland
  - Subcommittee on Emerging Threats and Capabilities
  - Subcommittee on Readiness and Management Support
- Committee on Environment and Public Works (2001–2009)
  - Subcommittee on Clean Air and Nuclear Safety
  - Subcommittee on Fisheries, Wildlife, and Water
  - Subcommittee on Transportation and Infrastructure (2007–2008)
  - Subcommittee on Superfund and Environmental Health (chairwoman, 2007–2009)
- Committee on Health, Education, Labor and Pensions (2001–2009)
  - Subcommittee on Children and Families
  - Subcommittee on Employment and Workplace Safety
- Special Committee on Aging.

She was a Commissioner of the Commission on Security and Cooperation in Europe (2001–2009)

She also held two leadership positions in the Senate Democratic Caucus:

1. Chairwoman of Steering and Outreach Committee (2003–2006)
2. Vice Chairwoman of Committee Outreach (2007–2009)

== Electoral history ==
United States Senate election in New York, 2000
Party	Candidate	Votes	%	±%
Democratic	Hillary Rodham Clinton	3,747,310	55.3	
Republican	Rick Lazio	2,915,730	43.0	

United States Senate election in New York, 2006
Party	Candidate	Votes	%	±%
Democratic	Hillary Rodham Clinton (Incumbent)	3,008,428	67.0	+11.7
Republican	John Spencer	1,392,189	31.0	−12.0

== See also ==
- Hillary Clinton as First Lady of the United States
- Hillary Clinton as Secretary of State
- Hillary Clinton as First Lady of Arkansas
- Legal career of Hillary Clinton
- Activities of Hillary Clinton subsequent to 2016
- Post-presidency of Bill Clinton
