= Run for Something =

American progressive political organization

Run For Something
- Founded: January 20, 2017; 9 years ago
- Founders: Amanda Litman, Ross Morales Rocketto
- Type: 501(c)(4)
- Website: runforsomething.net

Run for Something (RfS) is a progressive American political organization dedicated to recruiting and supporting young candidates running for down-ballot office. Its mission is to get young progressive candidates from non-traditional backgrounds to run for and win state and local offices, and create a next generation slate of political candidates that will seek higher office in the future.

It was founded on January 20, 2017 — the day of the inauguration of Donald Trump as president — by Amanda Litman, the email director of Hillary Clinton's 2016 U.S. presidential campaign, and Ross Morales Rocketto, a veteran of political campaigns.

In May 2017, political action organization Onward Together, founded by Clinton, selected Run for Something as one of its three primary partner organizations. In the 2017 Virginia elections, Run for Something-endorsed candidates won more than 40 percent of their races, almost four times the average for first-time candidates.

National Run for Office Day, to occur annually one week after Election Day, was created by Run for Something in 2017 to encourage more young progressives to run for office.

In spring 2025, after the second election and inauguration of Donald Trump, progressive Vermont Sen. Bernie Sanders partnered with RfS on his Fighting Oligarchy tour to recruit and train new progressive political talent.

According to its website, since 2017, Run for Something has endorsed more than 3,500 candidates across all 50 states and Washington D.C. As of 2025, the group claims to have elected candidates in more than 1,500 races across 49 states.
