= Swing Left =

American political organization

- Established: January 19, 2017; 9 years ago
- Founders: Ethan Todras-Whitehill; Miriam Stone; Josh Krafchin; Michelle Finocchi; Matt Ewing
- Legal status: Hybrid PAC
- Purpose: Democratic Party victories
- Headquarters: Washington, DC
- Website: swingleft.org

Swing Left is a progressive political group with hybrid PAC status in the United States that was created following the election of Donald Trump in 2016 with a goal of gaining a Democratic majority in United States legislatures. The group was founded by Ethan Todras-Whitehill, Miriam Stone, Josh Krafchin, Michelle Finocchi, and Matt Ewing to create ways for Democrats to volunteer in their nearest swing district. Its initial mission was to win a Democratic majority in the House of Representatives in 2018 by building a network of volunteers and donors in targeted swing districts across the U.S. Swing Left uses a margin of fifteen points to determine which seats are considered "swing seats", and then concentrates their efforts there. Swing Left cast a broader net in 2019, when they began putting effort toward maintaining a Democratic majority in United States State Legislatures after merging with another organization, Flippable. Swing Left focuses on training volunteers to register voters, phone bank, fundraise, and engage in door-to-door campaigning for Democratic candidates.

== History ==
Swing Left was the idea of Ethan Todras-Whitehill, a long-time Democrat who gained interest in starting the platform after being "flabbergasted and devastated" following the results of the 2016 United States presidential election. Todras-Whitehill urged his friends Josh Krafchin, a developer, and Josh's wife, Miriam Stone, a brand strategist, to reach out to developers and designers to help get the organization get off the ground. The group ended up finding marketing strategist Michelle Finocchi and advisor Matt Ewing to focus on outreach and community organization. Todras-Whitehill initially decided to focus on gaining a Democratic majority in the House of Representatives which, at the time of Swing Left's founding, was controlled by the Republican Party, because it seemed "tangible". Swing Left determines seats to be "swinging" by seeing which congressional districts were decided within a margin of fifteen points in the previous election.

== Political action ==
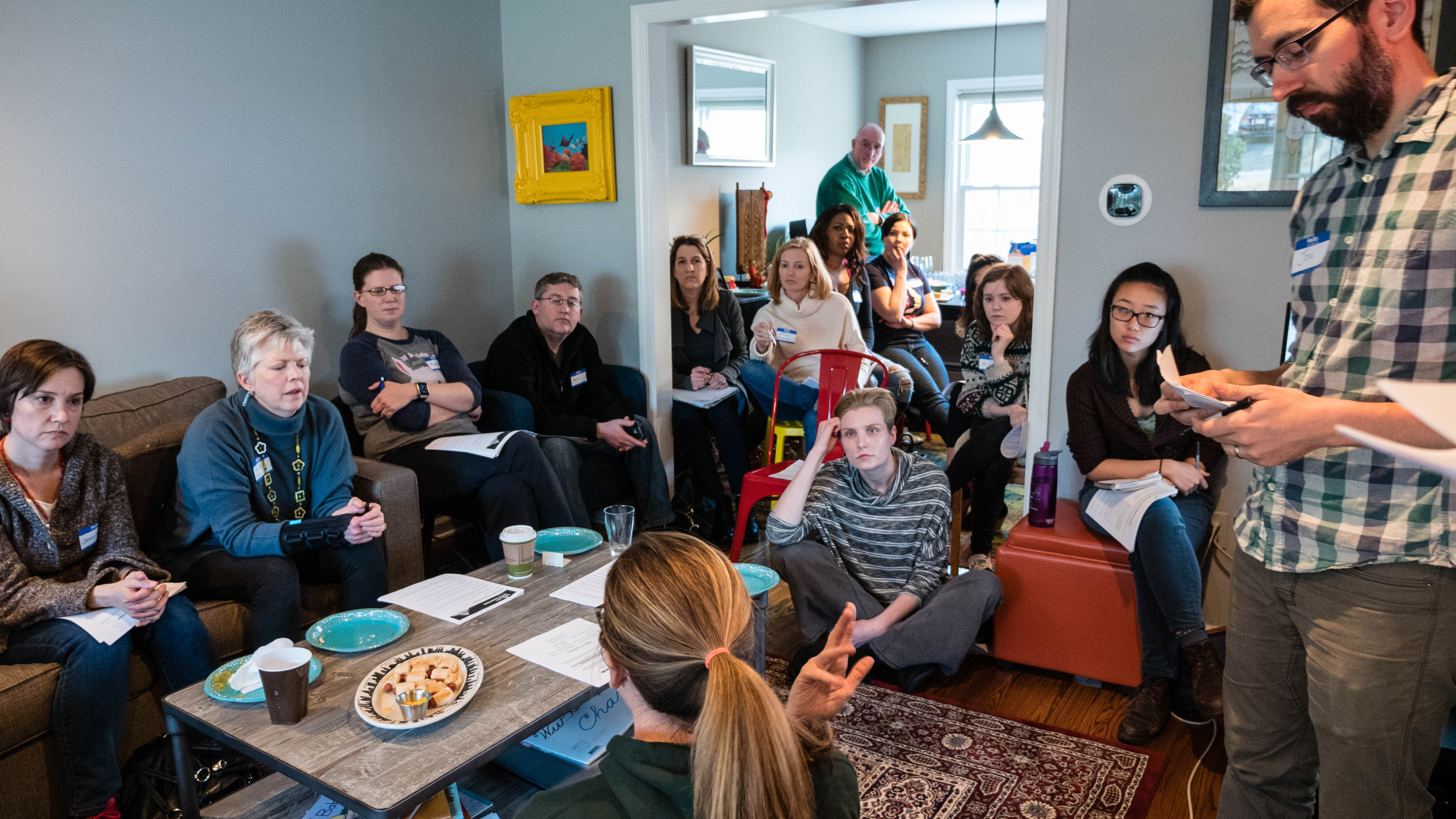
Swing Left Organizing Event for New Jersey's 7th Congressional District

Since its launch on January 19, 2017, Swing Left has recruited 300,000 volunteers and raised millions of dollars in donations. It has partnered with the Daily Kos and ActBlue with the goal of raising $100,000 for each of its targeted swing districts. Swing Left has created sub-chapters, including 31st Street Swing Left, which focuses on the Maryland, Virginia, and D.C area; 31st Street Swing Left focuses on funding campaigns of swing-candidates in their jurisdiction. In May 2017, Onward Together named Swing Left as one of the groups whose work it would support. In December 2017, Crooked Media announced a joint fundraising initiative with Swing Left called the Crooked Seven, to raise money for the eventual Democratic challengers of seven Republican-controlled House districts that Hillary Clinton won in 2016. Swing Left engages in phone banking, town halls, organizing events, and voter registration drives.

== Fundraising ==
Swing Left gathers donations from both organizations and individuals. Some notable donors of Swing Left include George Soros, Chris Sacca, and Tom Ford as well as organizations like Onward Together and Majority Forward. In 2020, days after Michael Bloomberg dropped out of the Democratic campaign for president, he donated $2 million to the organization, saying that the organization would help with the ultimate goal of "defeating Donald Trump". During the 2020 election cycle, Swing Left raised over $15 million, which was donated to different Democratic candidates in swing districts.

== Vote Forward ==
Vote Forward is a 501(c)(4) affiliate of Swing Left that encourages voting through volunteer handwritten letters. Scott Forman started Vote Forward in 2017 experimenting with 1,000 handwritten letters to inconsistent registered voters in Alabama. Turnout was 3.4% higher than the control group. Over 200,000 volunteers wrote letters in 2020. Letters could be written over months and sent at a strategic moment called the Big Send. 17.6 million letters boosted targeted voters' turnout by 0.8 percentage points.

== Flippable merge ==
In 2019, Swing Left merged with Flippable, a group with a similar mission focused on flipping state legislatures from Republican to Democratic control. The groups stated that their joint goal was to better strategize and prepare volunteers and donors for the 2020 election. One of their first initiatives as a group was to raise money for "competitive state-level districts". After the merger, Swing Left shifted focus on the Virginia state elections, in which their team raised $863,000 for Democratic candidates. The merger with Flippable shifted Swing Left from their original goal of focusing on maintaining a Democratic majority in the House of Representatives to also maintaining Democratic majority in state legislatures.

== Other activities ==
In 2018, Swing Left launched a campaign titled "The Last Weekend", where they partnered with Mandy Patinkin, Tracee Ellis Ross, Elizabeth Warren, Anna Wintour, and Kerry Washington, to encourage people to get out and vote through a series of videos. "The Last Weekend" also hosted a variety fundraising events in which they hosted performers Beck, David Grohl, and Karen O.
