= Onward Together =

American political action organization

- Predecessor: Hillary for America
- Founded: May 15, 2017; 9 years ago
- Founders: Hillary Rodham Clinton; Howard Dean
- Type: 501(c)(4); PAC
- Headquarters: New York, NY
- Website: onwardtogether.org

Onward Together is an American political action organization founded in May 2017 by former U.S. secretary of state and 2016 Democratic presidential nominee Hillary Clinton to fundraise for progressive political groups including: Swing Left, Indivisible, Color of Change, Emerge America, and Run for Something. Clinton described the group as an effort "to advance the vision that won nearly 66 million votes" of a "fairer, more inclusive, big-hearted America."

== Overview ==
Clinton co-founded the group with Howard Dean. In August 2017, Dean confirmed that Onward Together had hired Emmy Ruiz and Adam Parkhomenko as consultants, both of whom were members of Clinton's 2008 and 2016 presidential campaigns.

On May 15, 2017, Hillary Clinton tweeted the launch of Onward Together from her personal Twitter account. Clinton transferred $800,000 from her 2016 presidential campaign to Onward Together shortly before announcing the group's launch in May, as documents that the campaign filed with the FEC revealed.

== Activities ==
During the 2018 United States midterm elections the PAC funded Democratic candidates as well as grassroots organizations such as Swing Left.
