= Arkansas Advocates for Children and Families =

U.S. nonprofit organization

- Formation: May 17, 1977; 49 years ago
- Founder: group of people, including Hillary Clinton
- Founded at: Arkansas, United States
- Tax ID no.: 71-0492205
- Legal status: 501(c)(3) nonprofit organization
- Headquarters: Little Rock, Arkansas, United States
- Coordinates: 34.750379°N 92.287102°W
- President: Jay Barth
- Executive Director: Rich Huddleston
- Revenue: $2,139,014 (2014)
- Expenses: $1,858,171 (2014)
- Staff: 23 (2014)
- Website: www.aradvocates.org

Arkansas Advocates for Children and Families (AACF) is a non-profit advocacy organization which encourages public policy in Arkansas that will benefit children and their families.

Arkansas Advocates for Children and Families was founded in 1977 by attorney Hillary Rodham as a non-partisan 501(c)(3) group and continues to be supported by a wide variety of individuals and organizations.

== Policy positions and advocacy ==
In 1992 Arkansas Governor Jim Guy Tucker wanted to end its policy of increasing Aid to Families with Dependent Children payments for additional children born into families on welfare. Governor Tucker said that the proposed policy would encourage women on welfare to use state-provided birth control rather than conceive and it would save the state of Arkansas one-million dollars per year. Arkansas Advocates for Children and Families opposed the governor's proposed policy saying it would punish children and their mothers.

In 1994 Governor Tucker proposed expanding the number of crimes for which 14- and 15-year-olds could be tried as adults. Arkansas Advocates for Children and Families opposed the proposed policy, saying it would do nothing beneficial, and it would send more juveniles into the overburdened adult judicial system.

The Arkansas House of Representatives debated a bill that would allow police officers to stop, arrest, and interrogate children without notifying their parents in 1994. Prosecutors were in favor of the bill saying it was necessary for police at crime scenes to question children who might be witnesses or suspects.

The Arkansas Advocates for Children and Families said the bill was clearly unconstitutional because minors lack the legal understanding to waive their constitutional rights without consulting an adult adviser such as their parents.

In 1997, Arkansas Advocates for Children and Families advocated for increasing the number of eligible children participating in the summer lunch program. The group said that just six percent of eligible children participate in the summer lunch program, a rate much lower than any other state. A state agency said the low rate was a result of children having no transportation to serving locations as well as a new state law that students who failed classes were no longer required to attend summer school.

In 1998, Arkansas Advocates for Children and Families advocated for increased availability to child care, saying that families with two parents working needed additional help from the state with childcare so the parents can work.

Arkansas Advocates for Children and Families described Arkansas state income taxes as too high in 2000. The group said that Arkansas state income tax was regressive and put too large a burden on families with lower incomes. The group advocated for a zero-percent income tax rate for families with low incomes, refundable earned income tax credit for low-income families, and elimination of the state sales tax on groceries.
