= Corporate career of Hillary Clinton =

From the mid-1980s until 1992, Hillary Clinton served on the boards of directors of several companies. At the time she served on these boards, Clinton was the first lady of Arkansas (with her husband Bill Clinton serving as the state's governor) and was also a partner at the Rose Law Firm.

== Wal-Mart (1986–1992) ==
From 1986 until 1992, Clinton served on the corporate board of directors of Wal-Mart, an Arkansas-based company that was also a client of Rose Law, where Clinton was a partner. Wal-Mart was the largest discount retail chain in the United States.

Clinton was the first female member on Wal-Mart's board, added following pressure on chairman Sam Walton to name a woman to it. The board's size was expanded in order to accommodate Clinton's addition to it.

On the board, Clinton pushed successfully for Wal-Mart to adopt more environmentally friendly practices. Clinton also pushed the company to avoid discrimination against minorities and women. She was largely unsuccessful in her campaign for more women to be added to the company's management and was silent about the company's famously anti-labor union practices. According to Dan Kaufman, awareness of her silence on the company's anti-union practices later was a factor in her loss of credibility with organized labor, contributing to her later loss in the 2016 United States presidential election, in which slightly under half of union members voted for her Republican opponent, Donald Trump.

In 1991, Clinton reported earning $60,700 from her position on the board, more than a quarter of her and her husband's $235,000 in income reported that year.

== TCBY (1985–1992) ==
Clinton served on the corporate board of directors of yogurt manufacturer TCBY from 1985 until 1992. Like Wal-Mart, TCYB was an Arkansas-based company that was also a client of Rose Law, where Clinton was a partner.

In 1992, Erik Wulff, who had previously been the company's vice president speculated that the company's chairman, Frank Hickingbotham, had political motivations in inviting Clinton to join its board, speculating that Hickingbotham was, "making sure he was in good grace with the people in power." However, Wulff also described Clinton as being an intelligent and conscientious director.

== Lafarge (1990–1992) ==
From 1990 until 1992, Clinton served on the corporate board of directors of Lafarge. Clinton earned an annual salary of $31,000 from her position on the board of the cement manufacturer. Based in Virginia, the company did not do business in the state of Arkansas. Clinton was the board's first female director. In 1992, board member Edward Tuck claimed that he had decided to recommend Clinton for a position on its board after being impressed with nonprofit work Clinton had done related to children's matters.

== Southern Development Bancorp ==
In 1986, Clinton was involved in the establishment of Southern Development Bancorp, a bank holding company created to provide economic development loans to rural residents of Arkansas. Clinton served as a director of the company. The company, a community development bank, was founded by Clinton, her husband (Governor Bill Clinton) in partnership with local businesses and charitable leaders in order to meet a public need.

Clinton received no compensation from the role. However, the bank and its affiliates did business with the Rose Law Firm. Clinton was described in 1992 by its president, George Surgeon, as having served as the company's lead counsel, and Surgeon confirmed that its business with the Rose Law Firm had been influenced by Clinton's position at the firm. The company retained Rose Law Firm's services in its acquisition of Elkhorn Bank, an acquisition which required the approval of state banking regulators. In 1992, George Surgeon asserted that, while aware of the acquisition's details, Clinton did not involve herself in the acquisition effort. However, former state banking commissioner Marlin Jackson provided a recollection of Clinton having discussing the acquisition with him on one occasion.

The Clintons' involvement with the Southern Development Bancorp formed the inspiration for the Community Development Financial Institutions Act of 1994 signed into law during Bill Clinton's presidency.

== 1992 resignation from corporate boards ==
In May 1992, Clinton resigned her positions on the boards of Wal-Mart, TCBY, and Lafarge in order to focus on campaigning for her husband in the 1992 United States presidential election.
