= Hillary Clinton cattle futures controversy =

1978–79 controversial trading by Hillary Clinton

In 1978 and 1979, lawyer and First Lady of Arkansas Hillary Rodham Clinton engaged in a series of trades of cattle futures contracts. Her initial $1,000 investment had generated nearly $100,000 (equivalent to $443,603.85 in 2025), when she stopped trading after ten months. In 1994, after Clinton had become First Lady of the United States, the trading became the subject of considerable controversy regarding the likelihood of such a spectacular rate of return, possible conflict of interest, and allegations of disguised bribery. It was suspected by commentators that the profits were in fact allocations to her of profits from unrelated large block trades managed by her investment advisor James Blair, outside counsel to Tyson Foods, Arkansas' largest employer, in an attempt to gain influence with her husband Bill Clinton, then Attorney General of Arkansas.

== Background and Clinton's trading ==
Clinton had no experience in such financial instruments. Bill Clinton's salary as Arkansas Attorney General and then Governor of Arkansas was modest and Clinton later said she had been interested in building a financial cushion for the future. The Clintons' combined income in 1978 from the governorship and Rose Law Firm amounted to $51,173, equivalent to $252,600 in 2025. James Blair was a friend, lawyer, outside counsel to Tyson Foods, Arkansas' largest employer, and had been doing so well trading commodities futures that he encouraged friends and family to enter the market too. Blair in turn traded through, and relied upon cattle markets expertise from broker Robert L. "Red" Bone of Refco, a former Tyson executive. In October 1978, when Bill Clinton was Attorney General and on the verge of being elected Governor, Clinton opened a trading account, although Blair made most of the trades.

By January 1979, Clinton was up $26,000; but later, she would lose $16,000 in a single trade. At one point she owed in excess of $100,000 to Refco as part of covering losses, but no margin calls were made by Refco against her. Near the end of her trading, Blair correctly predicted a market downturn and sold short, giving her a $40,000 gain in one afternoon. In July 1979, once she became pregnant with Chelsea Clinton, "I lost my nerve for gambling [and] walked away from the table $100,000 ahead." She briefly traded sugar futures contracts and other non-cattle commodities in October 1979, but more conservatively, through Stephens Inc. During this period she made about $6,500 in gains, which she failed to pay taxes on at the time, consequently later paying some $14,600 in federal and state tax penalties in the 1990s. Once her daughter was born in February 1980, she moved all her commodities gains into U.S. Treasury Bonds.

== Media scrutiny ==
The profits made during the cattle trading first came to public light in a March 18, 1994 report by The New York Times, which had been reviewing the Clintons' financial records for two months. It coincided with the beginning of congressional hearings over the Whitewater controversy. Clinton initially told aides that she had made the futures gains by studying the financial news and placing trades herself, but later acknowledged the help of Blair. Media pressure continued to build, and on April 22, 1994, she gave an unusual press conference under a portrait of Abraham Lincoln in the State Dining Room of the White House, to address questions on both matters; it was broadcast live by CBS, NBC, ABC, and CNN. In it she said she had done the trading, but often relying upon the advice of Blair, and having him place orders for her; she said she did not believe she had received preferential treatment in the process. She also downplayed the dangers of such trading: "I didn't think it was that big a risk. [Blair] and the people he was talking with knew what they were doing."

== Likelihood of results ==
Various publications sought to analyze the likelihood of Clinton's successful results. Clinton made her money by betting mostly on a market downturn at a time when cattle prices actually doubled. The editor of the Journal of Futures Markets said in April 1994, "This is like buying ice skates one day and entering the Olympics a day later. She took some extraordinary risks." Her activities involved exposure to losses that could have been greater than her family's net worth if the market had turned sharply against her. The former head of the IRS chief counsel’s Commodities Industry Specialization Team expressed skepticism that a novice trader could make such a return. One analysis performed by Auburn University and published in the Journal of Economics and Finance claimed to find that the odds of a return as large as Clinton obtained during the period in question were about one in 31 trillion.

== Merc and Melamed investigations ==
Chicago Mercantile Exchange records indicated that $40,000 of her profits came from larger trades initiated by James Blair. According to exchange records, Robert "Red" Bone, the commodities broker that facilitated the trades on behalf of Refco, reportedly because Blair was a good client, allowed Clinton to maintain her positions even though she did not have enough money in her account to cover her activity. For example, she was allowed to order 10 cattle futures contracts, normally a $12,000 investment, in her first commodity trade in 1978 although she had only $1,000 in her account at the time. Bone denied any wrongdoing in conjunction with Clinton's trading and said he did not recall ever dealing with Clinton personally.

As it happened, during the period of Clinton's trading, Refco was under investigation by the Mercantile Exchange for systematic violations of its margin trading rules and reporting requirements regarding cattle trading. In December 1979, the exchange issued a three-year suspension to Bone and a $250,000 fine of Refco (at the time, the largest such penalty imposed by the exchange).

After the Clinton trading matter became public, Leo Melamed, a former chairman of the Mercantile Exchange, was brought in by request of the White House to review the trading records. On April 11, 1994, he said that the whole matter was "a tempest in a teapot" and that while her brokers had not required her to provide typical margin cushions, she had not knowingly benefited. On May 26, 1994, after the new records concerning the larger Blair trades came to light, he said "I have no reason to change my original assessment. Mrs. Clinton violated no rules in the course of her transactions." But as to the question of whether she had been allocated profits from larger block trades, he said of the new accounting, "It doesn't suggest that there was allocation, and it doesn't prove there wasn't," an assessment of uncertainty shared by Merton Miller, a Nobel Prize-winning economist at the University of Chicago Graduate School of Business.

== Clinton responses ==
Hillary Clinton's defenders, including White House Counsel Lloyd Cutler, maintained throughout that she had made her own decisions, that her own money was constantly at risk, and that she made both winning and losing trades throughout the ten months. Regarding suggestions that Blair had favored Clinton so that Tyson Foods could gain influence with Governor Clinton, they pointed out that CEO Don Tyson, who had in 1978 endorsed Clinton, in 1980 endorsed Frank D. White, Clinton's opponent in his reelection bid. Tyson denied any knowledge of Blair's trading partnership with Clinton. The New York Times noted, however, that notwithstanding Hillary Clinton's "artful explanation", the commodities trading had ended over a year before the 1980 election and that Tyson had switched sides after Bill Clinton did not lobby the state legislature to increase the weight limit on trucks, although Tyson believed that he had received such a promise from him at the time of the 1978 election.

Clinton's defenders also stressed that Blair and others stayed in the market longer than Clinton and lost much of what they had previously earned, showing that the risk was real. Indeed, some reports had Blair losing $15 million and Bone was reported as bankrupt.

== Official findings ==
There was no official governmental investigation into, or findings about, or charges brought regarding Hillary Rodham's cattle futures trading.
