= Legal career of Hillary Clinton =

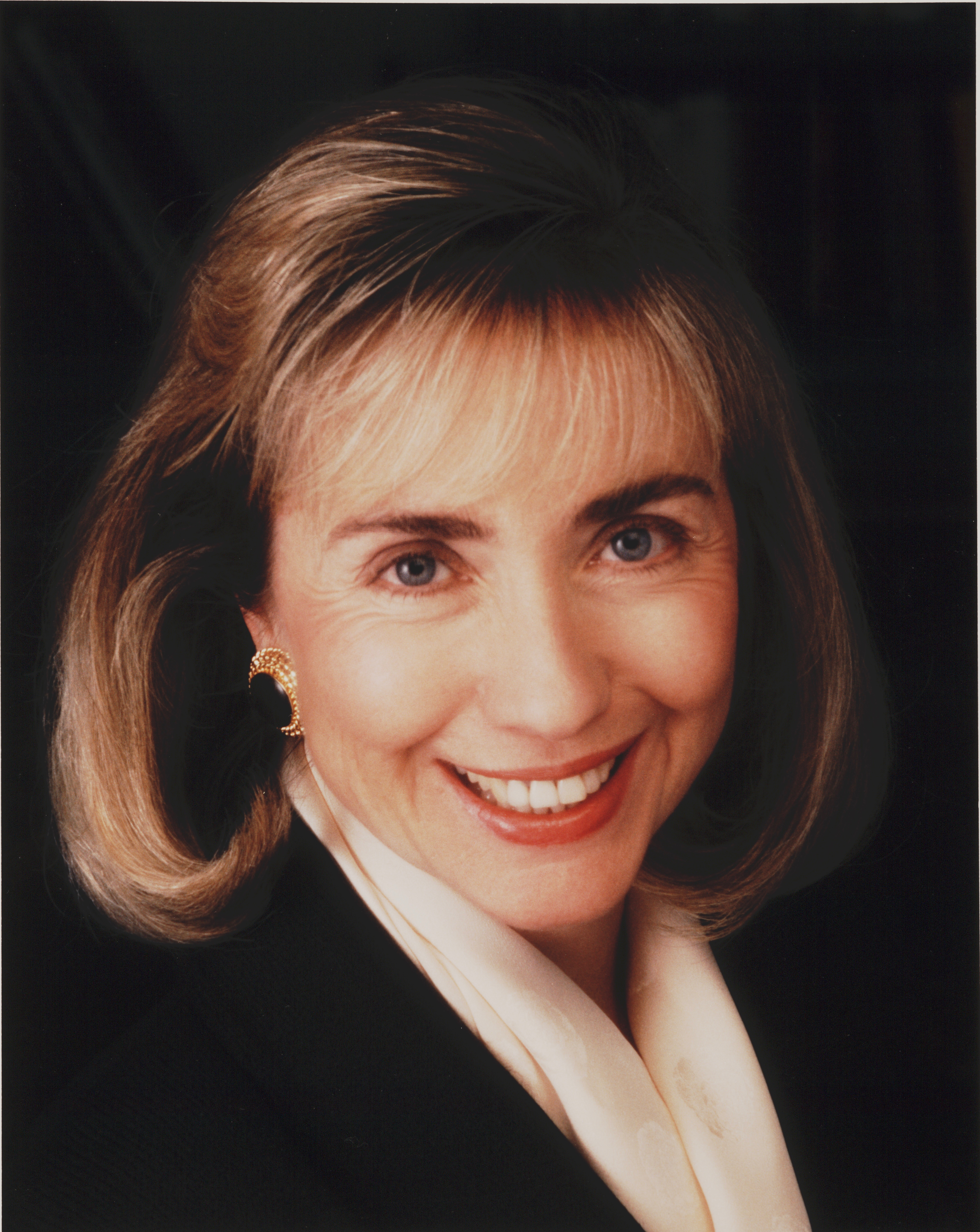
1992 portrait of Clinton

Following her graduation from Yale Law School in 1973 until becoming first lady of the United States in 1993, Hillary Clinton (née Hillary Rodham) practiced law. In 1988 and 1991 The National Law Journal named Clinton one of the 100 most influential lawyers in the United States.

During law school, Clinton had worked as a staff attorney at the Children's Defense Fund and as a consultant to the Carnegie Council on Children. Clinton graduated from law school in 1973. In 1974, Clinton worked as a member of the impeachment inquiry staff during the impeachment process against President Richard Nixon. After moving to Arkansas that same year, Clinton joined the faculty of the University of Arkansas Law School as one of only two female faculty at the time. During this time, Clinton was involved in founding and served as the director of the state's first legal aid clinic. Clinton's early litigation work had a large focus on family law and domestic disputes.

After moving to Little Rock, Arkansas following her husband's election as attorney general of Arkansas, Clinton joined the esteemed Rose Law Firm as the firm’s first female associate. She became the first woman to be made a full partner at the firm, and was one of only a handful of women that were acting as litigators in the state of Arkansas. Clinton was the state's first first lady to be employed at the time of her husband’s governorship. At the firm, she specialized in patent infringement and intellectual property law while working pro bono in child advocacy. Many of Clinton's cases saw her defend large corporations, and most of the clients she represented were businesses. She was considered a rainmaker at the firm due to the prestige she brought and the corporate connections she had. The firm's business with the state and her husband's position as governor gave rise to allegations of a conflict of interest for Clinton.

In 1977, Rodham cofounded Arkansas Advocates for Children and Families, a state-level alliance with the Children's Defense Fund. That same year, she was appointed by President Jimmy Carter to serve on the board of directors of the Legal Services Corporation, a role she held from 1978 until 1981. During part of that time, she served as the first female chair of that board.

== Early work on the East Coast ==
During her postgraduate studies, Clinton, at the time known as Hillary Rodham, worked as a staff attorney for Marian Wright Edelman's newly founded Children's Defense Fund in Cambridge, Massachusetts, and as a consultant to the Carnegie Council on Children. Clinton received her Juris Doctor after graduating from Yale Law School in 1973.

In 1974, she was a member of the impeachment inquiry staff in Washington, D.C. during the impeachment process against President Richard Nixon and advised the House Committee on the Judiciary during the Watergate scandal. Under the guidance of Chief Counsel John Doar and senior member Bernard W. Nussbaum, Rodham helped research procedures of impeachment and the historical grounds and standards for it. The committee's work culminated with the resignation of President Richard Nixon in August 1974.

== Early Arkansas career ==
After moving to Arkansas in 1974 with her boyfriend Bill Clinton, Rodham initially joined the University of Arkansas School of Law, where she was one of only two female faculty. She taught classes in criminal law. She was considered a rigorous teacher who was tough with her grades.

Soon after joining the faculty at the University of Arkansas Law School, Rodham managed to convince an all-male politically-conservative panel of 25 lawyers and jurists from the Arkansas Bar Association to provide $10,000 in funding to establish the state's first legal aid clinic. Rodham became the first director of the clinic at the University of Arkansas School of Law. Clinton secured support for the clinic from the local bar association and gained federal funding.

As a court-appointed lawyer, Rodham was required to act as defense counsel to a man accused of raping a 12-year-old girl (Kathy Shelton). After Rodham's request to be relieved of the assignment failed, she used an effective defense and counseled her client to plead guilty to a lesser charge. Rodham has called the trial a "terrible case". During her time in Fayetteville, Rodham and several other women founded the city's first rape crisis center.

Clinton's early litigation work saw great focus on cases related to family law and domestic disputes. In a 2016 article, Amy Chozick of the New York Times wrote,

A tour of Mrs. Clinton’s early work as a litigator, through interviews with some of the trial lawyers, judges and clients who remember her, turns up much of what would distinguish her as a politician many years later: Diligent preparation and a surgical approach to dismantling opposing arguments. A capacity for warmth with clients and adversaries alike. Toughness and deftness in the face of male condescension. And a minimal appetite for the spotlight, if not quite an aversion to it.

After Rodham married Bill Clinton on October 11, 1975, she initially retained her maiden name. Her motivation for doing so was threefold: she wanted to keep the couple's professional lives separate, avoid apparent conflicts of interest, and as she told a friend at the time, "it showed that I was still me". The decision upset both mothers, who were more traditional.

== Rose Law Firm ==
In November 1976, after Bill Clinton was elected Arkansas attorney general, and the couple moved to the state capital of Little Rock. In February 1977, Rodham joined the venerable Rose Law Firm, a bastion of Arkansan political and economic influence. She was the first female associate at the firm. She specialized in patent infringement and intellectual property law while working pro bono in child advocacy; she rarely performed litigation work in court. Clinton largely represented businesses, and a later Wall Street Journal review of court records indicates that the majority of the cases Clinton represented in court saw her defending large corporations. Clinton was the first Arkansas first lady to be employed during her husband's governorship.

While at the firm, Rodham maintained her interest in children's law and family policy, publishing the scholarly articles "Children's Policies: Abandonment and Neglect" in 1977 and "Children's Rights: A Legal Perspective" in 1979. The latter continued her argument that children's legal competence depended upon their age and other circumstances and that in serious medical rights cases, judicial intervention was sometimes warranted. An American Bar Association chair later said, "Her articles were important, not because they were radically new but because they helped formulate something that had been inchoate." Historian Garry Wills would later describe her as "one of the more important scholar-activists of the last two decades". Conservatives said her theories would usurp traditional parental authority, would allow children to file frivolous lawsuits against their parents, and exemplified critical legal studies run amok.

Clinton's first jury trial saw her represent a canning company in a lawsuit from a man that alleged that he had found part of a rodent in can of pork and beans which they produced. The canning company she represented was ordered to pay only nominal damages in the trial.

In 1977, one of the first assignments Clinton was given at the Rose Law Firm was to assist the First Electric Cooperative in litigation to overturn a ballot measure that had increased the electric rates that businesses were billed at while decreasing the electric rates that poor individuals were charged. The ballot measure had been championed by Association of Community Organizations for Reform Now (ACORN). Clinton wrote the legal brief for the case, which argued that the measure would cause businesses to leave the state. The First Electric Cooperative won the case. Laura Meckler and Peter Nicholas of The Wall Street Journal observed in 2016 that this assignment was contrary to Clinton's pre-corporate law roots. Clinton's Rose Law Firm colleague Webb Hubbell later recalled the assignment, writing, "Instead of defending poor people and righting wrongs, we found ourselves squarely on the side of corporate greed against the little people."

A 2016 New York Times article by Amy Chozick recounted that as, "one of only a handful of women litigating cases in [Arkansas]," Clinton, "carefully calibrated her appearance and approach."

While working at the law firm, Clinton represented a failed savings and loan association that had been led by James McDougal. McDougal and his wife would partner with Clinton and her husband in the Whitewater real estate investment that was the root of the later Whitewater controversy.

In 1977, Rodham cofounded Arkansas Advocates for Children and Families, a state-level alliance with the Children's Defense Fund. Later that year, President Jimmy Carter (for whom Rodham had been the 1976 campaign director of field operations in Indiana) appointed her to the board of directors of the Legal Services Corporation. She held that position from 1978 until the end of 1981. From mid-1978 to mid-1980, (Note: For the start date, see Brock 1996, p. 96. Secondary sources give inconsistent dates as to when her time as chair ended. Primary sources indicate that between about April 1980 and September 1980, Rodham was replaced as chair by F. William McCalpin. See Departments of State, Justice, and Commerce, the Judiciary, and Related Agencies Appropriations for 1981, "House Committee on Appropriations, Subcommittee on Departments of State, Justice, Commerce, the Judiciary, and Related Agencies Appropriations", U.S. House of Representatives, 1980. Rodham is still chair after having given birth "a few weeks ago"; Chelsea Clinton was born on February 27, 1980.) she was the chair of that board, the first woman to hold the job. During her time as chair, funding for the corporation was expanded from $90 million to $300 million; subsequently, she successfully fought President Ronald Reagan's attempts to reduce the funding and change the nature of the organization.

In 1979, Rodham became the first woman to be made a full partner at the Rose Law Firm. From 1978 until they entered the White House, she had a higher salary than her husband. In November 1980, Bill Clinton was defeated in his bid for re-election. Two years later, he returned to his job as governor of Arkansas after winning the election of 1982. During her husband's campaign to reassume the governorship, Hillary took a leave of absence from Rose Law to campaign for him full-time, and also began to use the name "Hillary Clinton", or sometimes "Mrs. Bill Clinton", to assuage the concerns of Arkansas voters, and she would continue to use this name. During her second stint as the first lady of Arkansas, she made a point of using Hillary Rodham Clinton as her name. (Note: As of 1993, she had not legally changed her name from Hillary Rodham.)

Clinton continued to practice law with the Rose Law Firm while she was again the first lady of Arkansas. She earned less than the other partners, as she billed fewer hours but still made more than $200,000 in her final year there. Clinton was billed fewer hours than other partners due to commitments from her position as first lady of the state and her charitable work. The firm considered her a "rainmaker" because she brought in clients, partly thanks to the prestige she lent it and to her corporate board connections. She was also very influential in the appointment of state judges. Bill Clinton's Republican opponent in his 1986 gubernatorial re-election campaign accused the Clintons of conflict of interest because Rose Law did state business; the Clintons countered the charge by saying that state fees were walled off by the firm before her profits were calculated.

In a case in which Clinton represented Maybelline, she convinced a judge to allow her to question an expert witness via a satellite video feed. This was a first in an Arkansas courtroom.

From 1987 to 1991, she was the first chair of the American Bar Association's Commission on Women in the Profession, created to address gender bias in the legal profession and induce the association to adopt measures to combat it. She was twice named by The National Law Journal as one of the 100 most influential lawyers in America—in 1988 and 1991. She was one of only four female lawyers featured on the 1988 list.

Clinton was chairman of the board of the Children's Defense Fund and on the board of the Arkansas Children's Hospital's Legal Services (1988–92). Clinton also held positions on the corporate board of directors of some Rose Law Firm clients. This included the board of TCBY from 1985 until 1992 and the board of Wal-Mart Stores from 1986 until 1992.

During her husband's 1992 presidential campaign, Clinton faced accusations that she had perhaps been the beneficiary of state business directed to the firm during her husband's governorship. Great public scrutiny was given to her career at Rose Law Firm.

Clinton's work with the Rose Law Firm is regarded as a lesser-known aspect of her biography. Clinton herself rarely discussed her fifteen years in corporate law when campaigning for president, at one point even completely omitting it from her 2016 presidential campaign's official biography of her.

== See also ==
- Governorships of Bill Clinton
