= Hillary Clinton as Secretary of State =

Leadership of the US Department of State

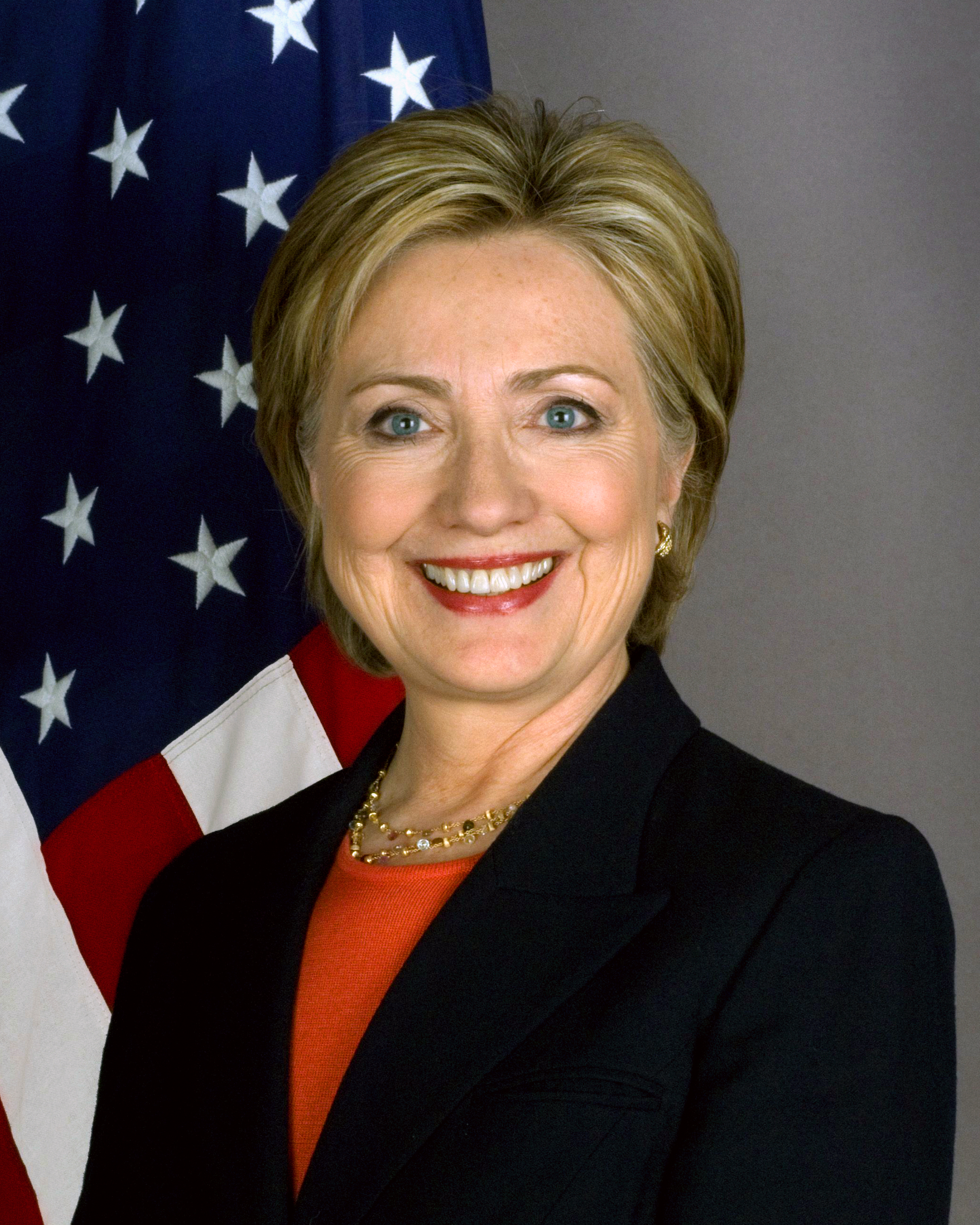
- Official portrait, 2009
- Hillary Clinton as Secretary of State; January 21, 2009 – February 1, 2013
- Party: Democratic
- Nominated by: Barack Obama
- Seat: Harry S Truman Building
- Seal of the United States Secretary of State

Hillary Clinton served as the 67th United States secretary of state, under President Barack Obama, from 2009 to 2013, overseeing the department that conducted the foreign policy of Barack Obama. She was preceded in office by Condoleezza Rice, and succeeded by John Kerry. She is also the only former First Lady of the United States to become a member of the United States Cabinet. As secretary of state she traveled widely and initiated many diplomatic efforts on behalf of the Obama administration.

Clinton established the Quadrennial Diplomacy and Development Review in 2009. She responded to the Arab Spring by advocating the 2011 military intervention in Libya, but was harshly criticized by both Republicans and Democrats for the failure to prevent or adequately respond to the 2012 Benghazi attack. Clinton helped to organize a diplomatic isolation and a regime of international sanctions against Iran in an effort to force it to curtail its nuclear program, which eventually led to the multinational Joint Comprehensive Plan of Action in 2015.

The strategic pivot to Asia was a central aspect of her tenure, underscoring the strategic shift in U.S. foreign policy focus from the Middle East and Europe towards Asia. She had a key role in launching the United States Global Health Initiative, which aimed to increase U.S. investment in global public health, including combating HIV/AIDS, tuberculosis, and malaria. Her use of a private email server as secretary was the subject of intense scrutiny; while no charges were filed against Clinton, the email controversy was the single most covered topic during the 2016 presidential election.

== Nomination and confirmation ==
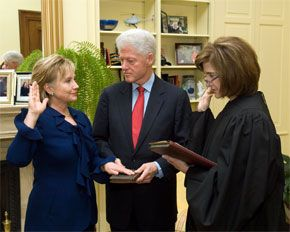
Clinton takes the oath of office as Secretary of State, administered by Associate Judge Kathryn Oberly as Bill Clinton holds the Bible.

Within a week after the November 4, 2008, presidential election, President-elect Obama and Clinton discussed the possibility of her serving as U.S. Secretary of State in his administration. Clinton initially turned Obama down, but he persisted. When the possibility became public on November 14, it came as a surprising and dramatic move, especially given the long, sometimes bitter battle the two had waged during the 2008 Democratic Party presidential primaries. Obama had specifically criticized Clinton's foreign policy credentials during the contests, and the initial idea of him appointing her had been so unexpected that she had told one of her own aides, "Not in a million years." However, Obama had been thinking of the idea as far back as the 2008 Democratic National Convention. Despite the aggressiveness of the campaign and the still-lingering animosities between the two campaign staffs, as with many primary battles, the political differences between the candidates were never that great, the two rivals had reportedly developed a respect for one another, and she had campaigned for him in the general election. Consideration of Clinton was seen as Obama wanting to assemble a "team of rivals" in his administration, as had Abraham Lincoln.

Clinton was conflicted whether she wanted to take the position or remain in the Senate, and agonized over her decision. While the Senate leadership had discussed possible leadership positions or other promotions in rank with her even before the cabinet position became a possibility, nothing concrete had been offered. The prospect of her ever becoming Senate Majority Leader seemed dim. A different complication was her husband's role. She told Obama: "it will be a circus if I take this job", making reference to the volatile effect Bill had during the primaries. In addition, there was a specific concern whether the financial and other involvements of Bill Clinton's post-presidential activities would violate any conflict-of-interest rules for serving cabinet members. There was as well considerable media speculation about what effect taking the position would have on her political career and any possible future presidential aspirations. Clinton wavered over the offer, but as she later related, "But, you know, we kept talking. I finally began thinking, look, if I had won and I had called him, I would have wanted him to say yes. And, you know, I'm pretty old-fashioned, and it's just who I am. So at the end of the day, when your president asks you to serve, you say yes, if you can." Clinton said she was reluctant to leave the Senate, but that the new position represented a "difficult and exciting adventure". As part of the nomination, Bill Clinton agreed to accept a number of conditions and restrictions regarding his ongoing activities and fundraising efforts for the Clinton Presidential Center and Clinton Global Initiative.

The appointment required a Saxbe fix, which was passed and signed into law in December 2008 before confirmation hearings began. Confirmation hearings before the Senate Foreign Relations Committee began on January 13, 2009, a week before the Obama inauguration. Clinton stated during her confirmation hearings that she believed that "the best way to advance America's interests in reducing global threats and seizing global opportunities is to design and implement global solutions" and "We must use what has been called 'smart power', the full range of tools at our disposal—diplomatic, economic, military, political, legal and cultural—picking the right tool or combination of tools for each situation. With smart power, diplomacy will be the vanguard of our foreign policy."

On January 15, the Committee voted 16–1 to approve Clinton. Republican Senator David Vitter of Louisiana was the lone dissenting vote in the committee. By this time, Clinton's public favorable/unfavorable rating had reached 65 percent, the highest point in her public career since the Clinton–Lewinsky scandal during her time as First Lady, and 71 percent of the public approved of the nomination to the cabinet.

Even before taking office, Clinton was working together with Bush administration officials in assessing national security issues. The night before the inauguration of the new president, contingency plans against a purported plot by Somali extremists against Obama and the inauguration was being discussed. Clinton argued that typical security responses were not tenable: "Is the Secret Service going to whisk him off the podium so the American people see their incoming president disappear in the middle of the inaugural address? I don't think so." (The threat turned out to not exist.) On January 21, 2009, Clinton was confirmed in the full Senate by a vote of 94–2. Vitter and Republican Senator Jim DeMint of South Carolina voted against the confirmation.

Clinton took the oath of office of Secretary of State that same day. Just before being sworn in as Secretary of State, Clinton resigned her Senate seat effective just hours before her oath as Secretary of State. She became the first former First Lady to serve in the United States Cabinet. She also became the first Secretary of State to have previously been an elected official since Edmund Muskie's less-than-a-year stint in 1980, with Christian Herter during the Eisenhower administration being the last one before that. In being selected by her formal rival Obama, she became only the fourth person in the preceding hundred years to join the cabinet of someone they had run against for their party's presidential nomination that election year (Jack Kemp ran against and was later chosen by George H. W. Bush to be Secretary of HUD in 1988, George W. Romney by Richard Nixon for Secretary of HUD in 1968, and Philander Knox by William Howard Taft for Secretary of State in 1908 preceded her; Obama's pick of Tom Vilsack for Secretary of Agriculture followed her a couple of weeks later to be the next such person).

(On January 29, 2009, the constitutionality of her Saxbe fix was challenged in court by Judicial Watch; on October 30, 2009, the courts dismissed the case.)

== Staff ==
During the presidential transition, Clinton's former campaign manager, Maggie Williams, handled the staff hiring process. Longtime counsel to both Clintons Cheryl Mills served as the secretary's Counselor and Chief of Staff. James B. Steinberg was named Deputy Secretary of State. Jacob "Jack" Lew, once Bill Clinton's Director of the Office of Management and Budget, was named Deputy Secretary of State for Management and Resources, a new position. This was an unusual step intended by Hillary Clinton to push to the forefront the emphasis on getting higher budget allocations from Congress and overlooking internal workings. Anne-Marie Slaughter was appointed Director of Policy Planning with a view towards long-term policy towards Asia. Huma Abedin, Clinton's longtime personal assistant, was Deputy Chief of Staff for the secretary and remained a key member of Clinton's operation.

Much like she did at the beginning of her Senate career, Clinton kept a low profile during her early months and worked hard to familiarize herself with the culture and institutional history of the department. She met or spoke with all of the living former secretaries, and especially relied upon her close friendship with Madeleine Albright.

At the start of her tenure, Obama and Clinton announced several high-profile special envoys to trouble spots in the world, including former Senate Majority Leader George Mitchell as Mideast envoy and Richard Holbrooke as envoy to South Asia and Afghanistan. Clinton appointed Todd Stern as the department's Special Envoy for Climate Change.

By May 2009, Clinton and the Obama administration intended to nominate Paul Farmer as administrator of the United States Agency for International Development (USAID), but by August his nomination was dead. This caused Clinton to publicly criticize the long vetting process for administration appointments/ In November, an unconventional choice was nominated instead, Rajiv Shah, a young Under Secretary of Agriculture for Research, Education, and Economics. Clinton said, "He has a record of delivering results in both the private and public sectors, forging partnerships around the world, especially in Africa and Asia, and developing innovative solutions in global health, agriculture, and financial services for the poor."

Despite some early press predictions, in general Clinton's departmental staff has avoided the kind of leaks and infighting that troubled her 2008 presidential campaign. One possibly lingering line of internal tension was resolved in early 2011 when State Department spokesperson P. J. Crowley resigned after making personal comments about in-captivity leaker Chelsea Manning and her treatment by the Department of Defense. In other changes, Jacob Lew left in late 2010 to join the White House as Office of Management and Budget and was replaced as Deputy Secretary of State for Management and Resources by Thomas R. Nides (Lew would eventually become White House Chief of Staff and then the pick for U.S. Treasury Secretary for Obama's second term), and Steinberg left in mid-2011 and was replaced as Deputy Secretary by career diplomat William J. Burns.

== Early themes and structural initiatives ==
During the transition period, Clinton sought to build a more powerful State Department. She began a push for a larger international affairs budget and an expanded role in global economic issues. She cited the need for an increased U.S. diplomatic presence, especially in Iraq where the U.S. Defense Department had conducted diplomatic missions. U.S. Secretary of Defense Robert Gates agreed with her, and also advocated larger State Department budgets. Indeed, the two, and their respective departments, would have a productive relationship, unlike the often fraught relations between State and Defense and their secretaries seen in prior administrations.

In the Obama administration's proposed 2010 United States federal budget of February 2009, there was a proposed 9.5 percent budget increase for the State Department and other international programs, from $47.2 billion in fiscal year 2009 to $51.7 billion in fiscal year 2010. By the time of Clinton's May 2009 testimony before the United States Senate Appropriations Subcommittee on State, Foreign Operations, and Related Programs, numbers had been restated following rounds of general federal budget cuts, and the proposed fiscal year 2010 budget request for the State Department and USAID was $48.6 billion, a 7 percent increase. That became the amount of increase that was obtained.

Clinton also brought a message of departmental reform to the position, especially in regarding foreign aid programs as something that deserves the same status and level of scrutiny as diplomatic initiatives.

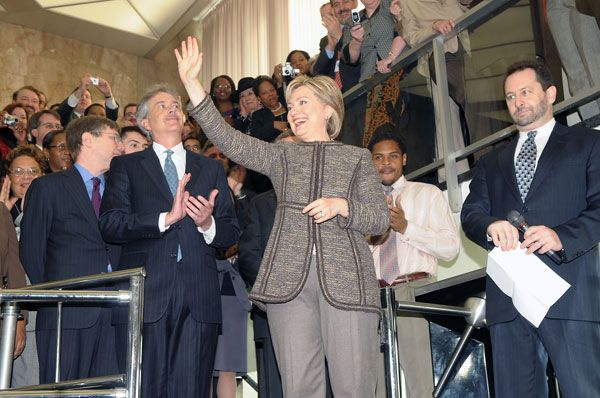
Secretary of State Hillary Rodham Clinton arrives at the State Department on her first day greeted by a standing room only crowd of Department employees.

Clinton spent her initial days as Secretary of State telephoning dozens of world leaders. She said the world was eager to see a new American foreign policy and that, "There is a great exhalation of breath going on around the world. We've got a lot of damage to repair." She did indicate that not every past policy would be repudiated, and specifically said it was essential that the six-party talks over the North Korean nuclear weapons program continue. Clinton re-emphasized her views during her first speech to State Department employees when she said, "There are three legs to the stool of American foreign policy: defense, diplomacy, and development. And we are responsible for two of the three legs. And we will make clear, as we go forward, that diplomacy and development are essential tools in achieving the long-term objectives of the United States. And I will do all that I can, working with you, to make it abundantly clear that robust diplomacy and effective development are the best long-term tools for securing America's future." Clinton also soon visited the United States Agency for International Development, where she met employees and said they would be getting extra funds and attention during the new administration.

She kept a low profile when diplomatic necessity or Obama's involvement required it, but maintained an influential relationship with the president and in foreign policy decisions. Her first 100 days found her travelling over 70,000 miles (110,000 km), having no trouble adapting to being a team player subordinate to Obama, and gaining skills as an executive. Nevertheless, she remained an international celebrity with a much higher profile than most Secretaries of State. Her background as an elected official gave her insight into the needs and fears of elected officials of other countries.

By the summer of 2009, there was considerable analysis and speculation in the media of what kind of role and level of influence Clinton had within the Obama administration, with a variety of assessments being produced. A prominent mid-July speech to the Council on Foreign Relations reasserted her role; she said, "We cannot be afraid or unwilling to engage. Our focus on diplomacy and development is not an alternative to our national security arsenal."

In July 2009, Clinton announced a new State Department initiative, the Quadrennial Diplomacy and Development Review, to establish specific objectives for the State Department's diplomatic missions abroad. The most ambitious of Clinton's departmental reforms, it is modeled after the Defense Department's Quadrennial Defense Review, which Clinton was familiar with from her days on the Senate Armed Services Committee. The first such Review came out in December 2010. Entitled Leading Through Civilian Power, its 220 pages centered on the notion of elevating "civilian power" as a cost-effective way of responding to international challenges and defusing crises. It also sought the elevation of U.S. ambassadors in coordinating work of all abroad-tasked U.S. agencies. Clinton said of the underlying message, "Leading with civilians saves lives and money." She also resolved to get Congress to approve the QDDR as a required part of the State Department planning process, saying, "I am determined that this report will not merely gather dust, like so many others." Another theme of the report was the goal of empowering the female population in developing countries around the world; the QDDR mentioned women and girls some 133 times. In part this reflected incorporation into the QDDR of the Hillary Doctrine, which stipulates that women's rights and violence against women around the world should be considered issues of national security to the United States. In addition, by attempting to institutionalize her goals in this area, Clinton – along with Anne-Marie Slaughter and Melanne Verveer, who also worked heavily in these efforts – were hoping that her initiatives and concerns towards the empowerment of women would persist past Clinton's time in office as well as break a past pattern of chauvinism in the department.

In September, Clinton unveiled the Global Hunger and Food Security Initiative at the annual meeting of her husband's Clinton Global Initiative. The goal of the new initiative is to battle hunger worldwide on a strategic basis as a key part of U.S. foreign policy, rather than just react to food shortage emergencies as they occur. The secretary said that "Food security is not just about food. But it is all about security: economic security, environmental security, even national security. Massive hunger poses a threat to the stability of governments, societies and borders." The initiative seeks to develop agricultural economies, counter malnourishment, increase productivity, expand trade, and spur innovation in developing nations. Clinton said that women would be placed at the center of the effort, as they constitute a majority of the world's farmers. The next month, to mark World Food Day, Clinton said, "Fighting hunger and poverty through sustainable agricultural development, making sure that enough food is available and that people have the resources to purchase it, is a key foreign policy objective of the Obama administration."

During October 2009, Clinton said, "this is a great job. It is a 24/7 job" and "this job is incredibly all-encompassing." She said she never thought about if she were making the same foreign policy decisions as president, and had no intention of ever running for that office again. While some friends and former advisers thought she was primarily saying that to focus attention on her current role and that she might change her mind about running for president in the future, others felt that she was genuinely content with the direction her career and life had taken and no longer had presidential ambitions.

By the close of 2009 there were 25 female ambassadors posted by other nations to Washington; this was the highest number ever. This was dubbed the "Hillary effect" by some observers: "Hillary Clinton is so visible" as secretary of state, said Amelia Matos Sumbana, the Mozambique Ambassador to the United States, "she makes it easier for presidents to pick a woman for Washington." An added fact, of course, was that two other recent U.S. Secretaries of State were women, but Clinton's international fame from her days as First Lady of the United States made her impact in this respect the greatest of the group.

Clinton also included in the State Department budget for the first time a breakdown of programs that specifically concerned themselves with the well-being of women and girls around the world. By fiscal 2012, the department's budget request for such work was $1.2 billion, of which $832 million was for global health programs. Additionally, she initiated the Women in Public Service Project, a joint venture between the State Department and the Seven Sisters colleges. The goal was to entice more women into entering public service, such that within four decades an equal number of men and women would be working in the field.

One specific cause Clinton advocated almost from the start of her tenure was the adoption of cookstoves in the developing world, to foster cleaner and more environmentally sound food preparation and reduce smoke dangers to women. In September 2010, she announced a partnership with the United Nations Foundation to provide some 100 million such stoves around the world within the next ten years, and in subsequent travels she urged foreign leaders to adopt policies encouraging their use.

In February 2010 testimony before the Senate Appropriations Subcommittee on State, Foreign Operations, and Related Programs, Secretary Clinton complained about the slow pace of Senate confirmations of Obama's nominations to diplomatic positions, a number of which were delayed for political reasons and had been subject to holds by individual Republican senators. Clinton said the problem damaged America's image abroad: "It became harder and harder to explain to countries, particularly countries of significance, why we had nobody in position for them to interact with."

In 2009, and again in 2010 and 2011, Clinton stated that she was committed to serving out her full term as secretary, but would not commit to serving a second term should Obama be re-elected.

She later used U.S. allies and what she called "convening power" to help keep the Libyan rebels unified as they eventually overthrew the Gaddafi regime.

Throughout her tenure, Clinton has looked towards "smart power" as the strategy for asserting U.S. leadership and values, combining military strength with U.S. capacities in global economics, development aid, and technology. In late 2011 she said, "All power has limits. In a much more networked and multipolar world we can't wave a magic wand and say to China or Brazil or India, 'Quit growing. Quit using your economies to assert power' ... It's up to us to figure out how we position ourselves to be as effective as possible at different times in the face of different threats and opportunities."

Clinton has also greatly expanded the State Department's use of social media, including Facebook and Twitter, both to get its message out and to help empower people vis à via their rulers. Clinton said, "We are in the age of participation, and the challenge ... is to figure out how to be responsive, to help catalyze, unleash, channel the kind of participatory eagerness that is there." She has tried to institutionalize this change, by making social media a focus for foreign service officers and up to the ambassadorial level. (Other Clinton initiatives were run solely out of her office and were at risk of disappearing after she left office.) By late 2011, the department had 288 Facebook accounts and 192 Twitter feeds. The change was enough for daughter Chelsea Clinton to refer to the secretary as "TechnoMom".

== Regional issues and travels ==
=== 2009 ===
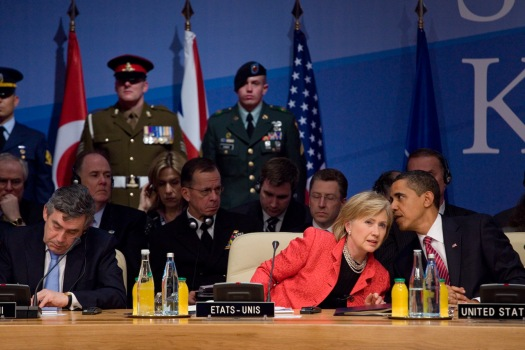
Obama and Clinton speaking with one another at the 21st NATO summit in April 2009.

In February 2009, Clinton made her first trip as secretary to Asia, visiting Japan, Indonesia, South Korea, and China on what she described as a "listening tour" that was "intended to really find a path forward." She continued to travel heavily in her first months in office, often getting very enthusiastic responses by engaging with the local populace.

In early March 2009, Clinton made her first trip as secretary to Israel. During this time, Clinton announced that the US government will dispatch two officials to the Syrian capital to explore Washington's relationship with Damascus. On March 5, Clinton attended the NATO foreign ministers meeting in Brussels. At this meeting, Clinton proposed including Iran at a conference on Afghanistan. Clinton said the proposed conference could be held on March 31 in the Netherlands. On March 6, a photo-op with Russian Foreign Minister Sergey Lavrov intended to demonstrate the U.S. and Russia pressing the "reset button" on their relationship, in an effort to mend frayed ties, went a bit awry due to a mistranslation. (The word the Americans chose, "peregruzka", meant "overloaded" or "overcharged", rather than "reset".) The episode became known as the Russian reset.

More relevant to March 6, 2009, is a visit Clinton made to Geneva, Switzerland. UBS Group AG is a Swiss multinational investment bank. The day after settling its criminal case on 19 February 2009, the U.S. government filed a civil suit against UBS to reveal the names of all 52,000 American customers, alleging that the bank and these customers conspired to defraud the IRS and federal government of legitimately owed tax revenue. Shortly thereafter, Hillary Clinton, having been sworn in as Secretary of State in January, traveled to Geneva on March 6, 2009, to meet with the Swiss Foreign Minister to announce a settlement of the IRS suit. Within a few months, the Internal Revenue Service and the Department of Justice had arranged a tentative settlement in which the Swiss Financial Market Supervisory Authority (FINMA) would reveal information on 4,450 of the 52,000 accounts sought by the IRS, preserving the anonymity of more than 90 percent of the United States customers of UBS's cross-border business.

On August 12, 2009, UBS announced a settlement deal that ended its litigation with the IRS. U.S. Senator Carl Levin (D-MI), who conducted Senate hearings into the UBS tax evasion scandal, described the settlement agreement (known as the "Annex") "disappointing."

[T]he tortured wording and the many limitations in this Annex shows the Swiss Government trying to preserve as much bank secrecy as it can for the future, while pushing to conceal the names of tens of thousands of suspected U.S. tax cheats. It is disappointing that the U.S. government went along.

However, this settlement set up a showdown between the U.S. and Swiss governments over the secrecy of Swiss bank accounts. It was not until June 2010 that Swiss lawmakers approved a deal to reveal client data and account details of U.S. clients who were suspected of tax evasion.

During March 2009, Clinton prevailed over Vice President Joe Biden on an internal debate to send an additional 20,000 troops to Afghanistan.

In June 2009, Clinton had surgery to repair a right elbow fracture caused by a fall in the State Department basement. The painful injury and recuperation caused her to miss two foreign trips. Nevertheless, during President Obama's trip without her to Russia, Clinton was named as co-coordinator, along with Russian Foreign Minister Sergey Lavrov, of a newly created U.S.-Russian Presidential Commission to discuss nuclear, economic, and energy and environmental policies relating to the two countries.

Clinton returned to the diplomatic scene and responded to the ongoing 2009 Honduran constitutional crisis, in which plans for the Honduran fourth ballot box referendum had led to the 2009 Honduran coup d'état, and which was becoming Latin America's worst political crisis in some years. In early July, she sat down with ousted President of Honduras Manuel Zelaya, who agreed on a U.S.-backed proposal to begin talks with the de facto Roberto Micheletti government. Later, in September, Zelaya returned to the country, and President of Costa Rica Óscar Arias, who had become a mediator in the matter, as well as Clinton expressed hope that Zelaya's return could break the impasse with the Micheletti government. In particular, Clinton said, "Now that President Zelaya is back it would be opportune to restore him to his position under appropriate circumstances – get on with the election that is currently scheduled for November, have a peaceful transition of presidential authority and get Honduras back to constitutional and democratic order." At the end of October, Clinton took a leading role in convincing Micheletti to accept a deal – which she termed an "historic agreement" – in which Zelaya would return to power in advance of general elections in which neither figure was running. Micheletti said that Clinton had been insistent on this point: "I kept trying to explain our position to her, but all she kept saying was, 'Restitution, restitution, restitution.'" That agreement broke down, despite efforts of the State Department to revive it, and Clinton and the U.S. ended up supporting the winner of the 2009 Honduran general election, Porfirio Lobo Sosa, with Clinton characterizing the elections as "free and fair" and Lobo as holding a strong commitment to democracy and the rule of constitutional law.

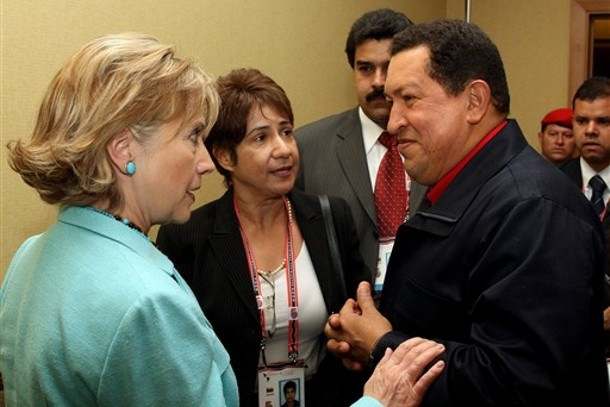
Clinton meets with President Hugo Chávez at the Summit of the Americas on April 19, 2009

Clinton co-chaired the high-level U.S.–China Strategic and Economic Dialogue in Washington, D.C., on July 27–28, 2009 and led the Strategic Track for the United States.

In August 2009, Clinton embarked on her longest trip yet, to a number of stops in Africa. On August 10, 2009, at a public event in Kinshasa, a Congolese student asked her what her husband, "Mr Clinton", thought of a Chinese trade deal with the Democratic Republic of the Congo. Clinton looked irritated at the question and replied, "Wait, you want me to tell you what my husband thinks? My husband is not the secretary of state, I am. So you ask my opinion, I will tell you my opinion. I am not going to be channeling my husband." The incident was played in newsrooms around the world. Clinton aides suggested there might have been a mistranslation, but that was not the case; however the student had later apologized to her, saying he had meant to ask what "Mr Obama" thought.

In October 2009, Clinton's intervention – including juggling conversations on two mobile phones while sitting in a limousine – overcame last-minute snags and saved the signing of an historic Turkish–Armenian accord that established diplomatic relations and opened the border between the two long-hostile nations.

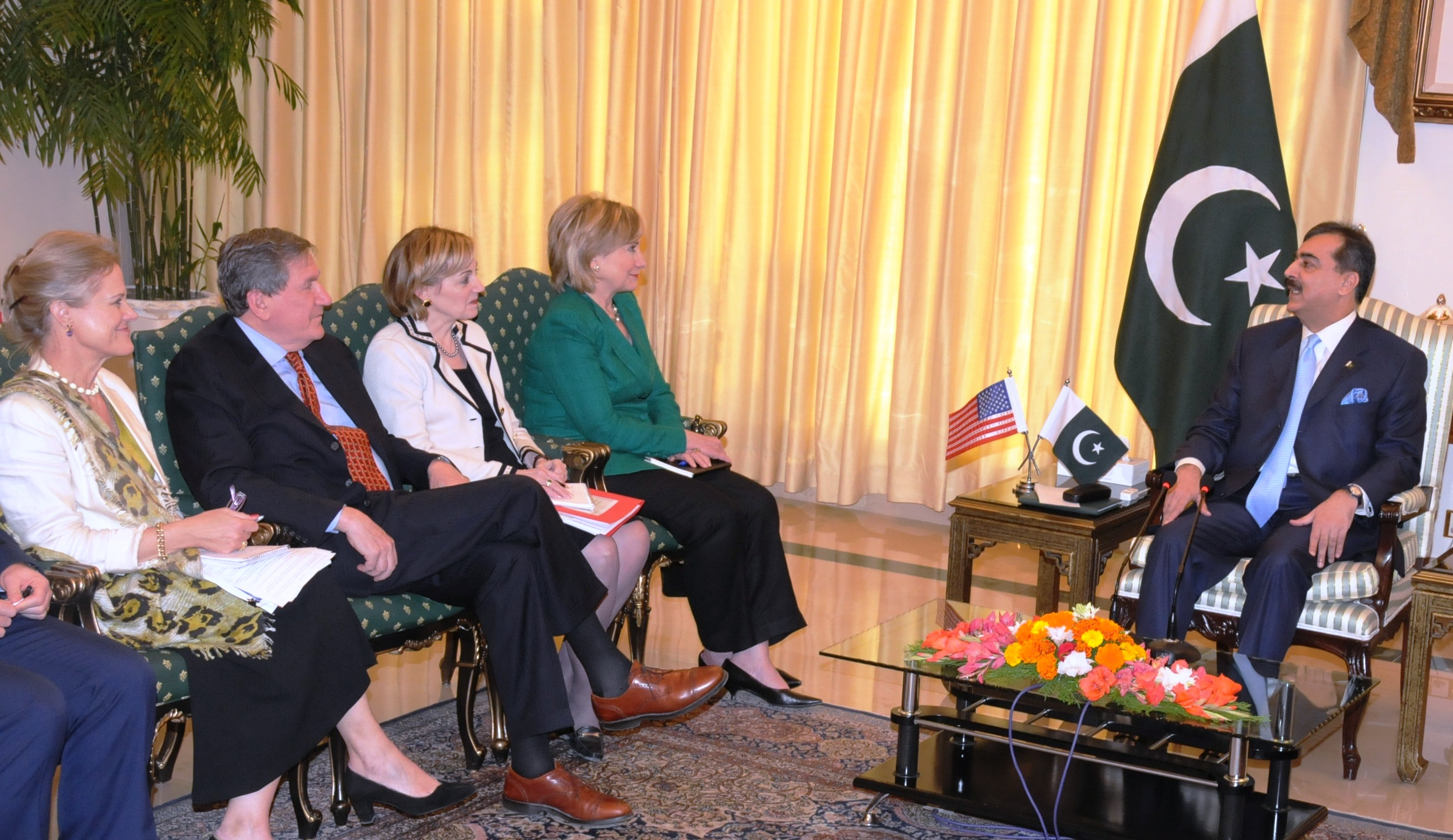
Clinton with Pakistani Prime Minister Yousaf Raza Gillani during an October 2009 visit to Islamabad.

In late October 2009, Clinton travelled to Pakistan, where she had staged a memorable visit in 1995 while First Lady. Her arrival was followed within hours by the October 2009 Peshawar bombing; in response, Clinton said of those responsible, "They know they are on the losing side of history but they are determined to take as many lives with them as their movement is finally exposed for the nihilistic, empty effort that it is." In addition to meeting with Prime Minister Yousaf Raza Gillani, she also staged numerous public appearances. In those, she let students, talk show hosts, and tribal elders repeatedly complain about and criticize American foreign policy and American actions. Occasionally, she pushed back in a more blunt fashion than usual for diplomats, explicitly wondering why Pakistan had not been more successful in combating al Qaeda "if they wanted to." Member of Parliament and government spokesperson Farahnaz Ispahani said, "In the past, when the Americans came, they would talk to the generals and go home. Clinton's willingness to meet with everyone, hostile or not, has made a big impression – and because she's Hillary Clinton, with a real history of affinity for this country, it means so much more."

On the same trip, Clinton visited the Middle East, in an effort to restart the Israeli–Palestinian peace process.

In November 2009, Secretary Clinton led the U.S. delegation at the 20th anniversary celebrations of the fall of the Berlin Wall. There, she said: "Our history did not end the night the wall came down, it began anew. ... To expand freedom to more people, we cannot accept that freedom does not belong to all people. We cannot allow oppression defined and justified by religion or tribe to replace that of ideology."

In December 2009, Clinton attended the Copenhagen United Nations Climate Change Conference, where she pushed forward a last-minute proposal of significant new amounts of foreign aid to help developing countries deal with the effects of global warming, in an attempt to unstick stuck negotiations and salvage some sort of agreement at the conference. The secretary said, "We're running out of time. Without the accord, the opportunity to mobilize significant resources to assist developing countries with mitigation and adaptation will be lost." The amount of aid she proposed, $100 billion, was in the modest terms of the Copenhagen Accord that was agreed to by the summit.

Secretary Clinton finished the year with very high approval ratings. She also narrowly edged out former Alaska Governor Sarah Palin in being America's most-admired woman, per a Gallup finding.

=== 2010 ===
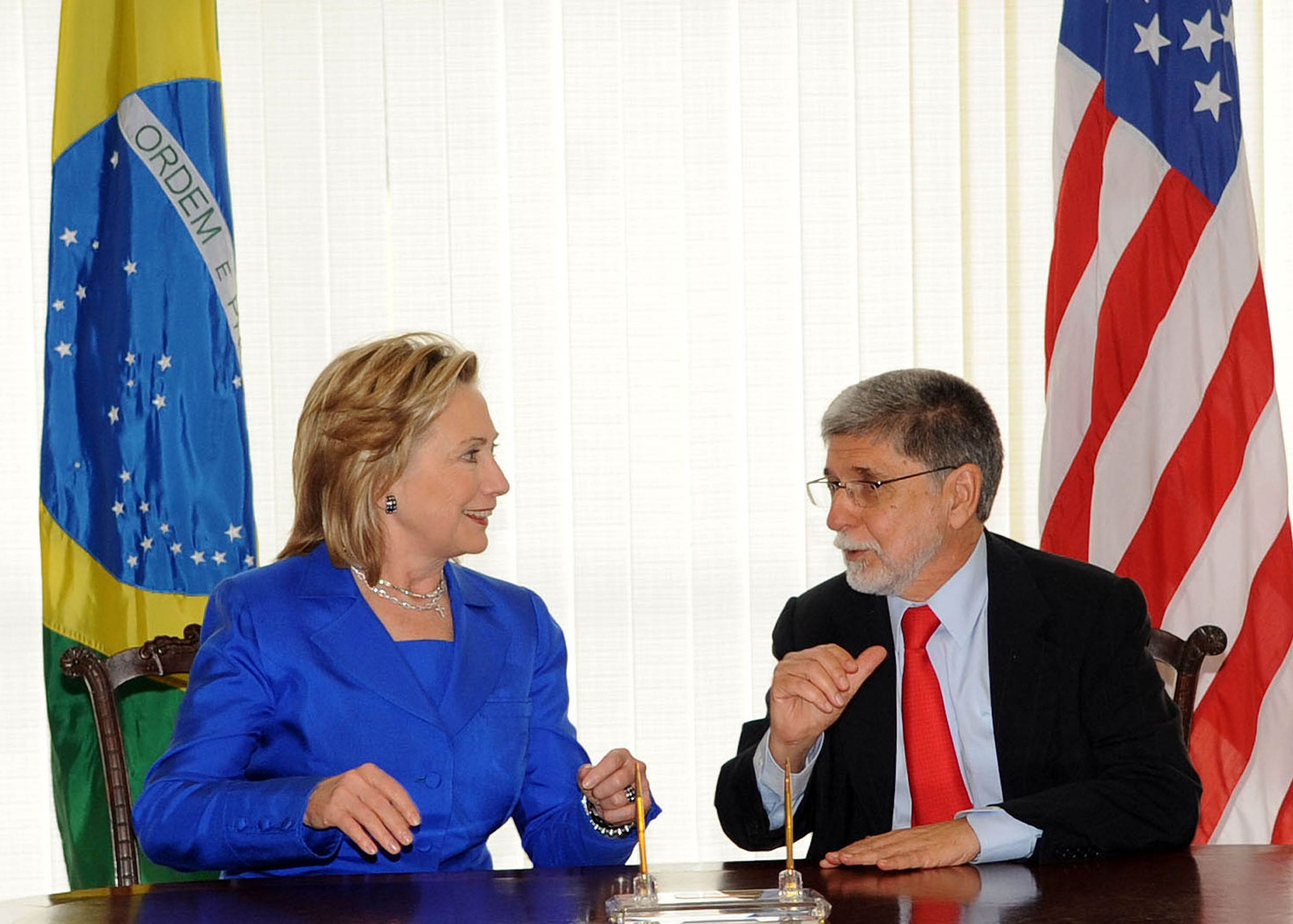
Secretary Clinton met with Celso Amorim, Foreign Minister of Brazil, in March 2010 at the Palácio do Itamaraty in Brasília

In January 2010, Secretary Clinton cut short a trip to the Asia-Pacific region in order to see firsthand the destructive effects of the 2010 Haiti earthquake and to meet with President of Haiti René Préval. Clinton said she would also evaluate the relief effort and help evacuate some Americans. She stressed that her visit was designed not to interfere with ongoing efforts: "It's a race against time. Everybody is pushing as hard as they can." The Clintons had a special interest in Haiti going back decades, from their delayed honeymoon there up to Bill Clinton being the United Nations Special Envoy to Haiti at the time of the earthquake.

In a major speech on January 21, 2010, Clinton, speaking on behalf of the U.S., declared that "We stand for a single Internet where all of humanity has equal access to knowledge and ideas", while highlighting how "even in authoritarian countries, information networks are helping people discover new facts and making governments more accountable." She also drew analogies between the Iron Curtain and the free and unfree Internet. Her speech, which followed a controversy surrounding Google's changed policy toward China and censorship, appears to mark a split between authoritarian capitalism and the Western model of free capitalism and Internet access. Chinese officials responded strongly, saying Clinton's remarks were "harmful to Sino-American relations" and demanded that U.S. officials "respect the truth", and some foreign policy observers thought that Clinton had been too provocative. But the White House stood behind Clinton, and demanded that China provide better answers regarding the recent Chinese cyberattack against Google. Clinton's speech garnered marked attention among diplomats, as it was the first time a senior American official had clearly put forth a vision in which the Internet was a key element of American foreign policy.

By early 2010, the Obama administration's efforts towards forging a new relationship with Iran had failed to gain headway, and the U.S. adopted a policy of adopting international sanctions against it and isolating it diplomatically in order to curtail that country's nuclear program. This was a policy more in line with Clinton's thinking and went back to disagreements she and Obama had had during the 2008 presidential campaign. Clinton was put in charge of rallying support in the United Nations for these sanctions and spent considerable time over the following months and years doing so. At times Clinton suggested the possibility of military action against Iran should economic and diplomatic actions fail to deter it from its nuclear ambitions.

In February 2010, Clinton made her first visit to Latin America as secretary. The tour would take her to Uruguay, Chile, Brazil, Costa Rica and Guatemala and Argentina. She first visited Buenos Aires and talked to Argentine President Cristina Fernández de Kirchner. They discussed Falkland Islands sovereignty and the issue of oil in the Falklands. Clinton said that "We would like to see Argentina and the United Kingdom sit down and resolve the issues between them across the table in a peaceful, productive way." Clinton offered to help facilitate such discussions, but did not agree to an Argentinian request that she mediate such talks. Within 12 hours of Clinton's remarks, Downing Street categorically rejected a U.S. role: "We welcome the support of the secretary of state in terms of ensuring that we continue to keep diplomatic channels open but there is no need for [direct involvement]." Clinton then went on to Santiago, Chile to witness the aftereffects of the 2010 Chile earthquake and to bring some telecommunications equipment to aid in the rescue and recovery efforts.

In April 2010, there was a flurry of speculation that Clinton would be nominated to the U.S. Supreme Court to fill the vacancy created by Justice John Paul Stevens' retirement, including a plug from ranking Senate Judiciary Committee member Orrin Hatch. The notion was quickly quashed by the White House, which said, "The president thinks Secretary Clinton is doing an excellent job as secretary of state and wants her to remain in that position." A State Department spokesperson said that Clinton "loves her present job and is not looking for another one."

By mid-2010, Clinton and Obama had clearly forged a good working relationship without power struggles; she was a team player within the administration and a defender of it to the outside, and was careful to make sure that neither she nor her husband would upstage him. He in turn was accommodating to her viewpoints and in some cases adopted some of her more hawkish approaches. She met with him weekly, but did not have the close, daily relationship that some of her predecessors had had with their presidents, such as Condoleezza Rice with George W. Bush, James Baker with George H. W. Bush, or Henry Kissinger with Richard Nixon. Nevertheless, he had trust in her actions.

During an early June 2010 visit to Colombia, Ecuador, and Peru, Clinton dealt with questions at every stop about the recently passed and widely controversial Arizona SB 1070 anti-illegal immigration law, which had damaged the image of the U.S. in Latin America. When answering a question from local television reporters in Quito about it, she said that President Obama was opposed to it and that "The Justice Department, under his direction, will be bringing a lawsuit against the act." This was the first public confirmation that the Justice Department would act against the law; a month later, it became official as the lawsuit United States of America v. Arizona. While at a hotel bar in Lima, she completed an agreement with a representative of China over which companies could be specified in a UN resolution sanctioning the nuclear program of Iran. Returning to SB 1070, in August 2010 she included the dispute over it in a report to the Office of the United Nations High Commissioner for Human Rights, as an example to other countries of how fractious issues can be resolved under the rule of law.

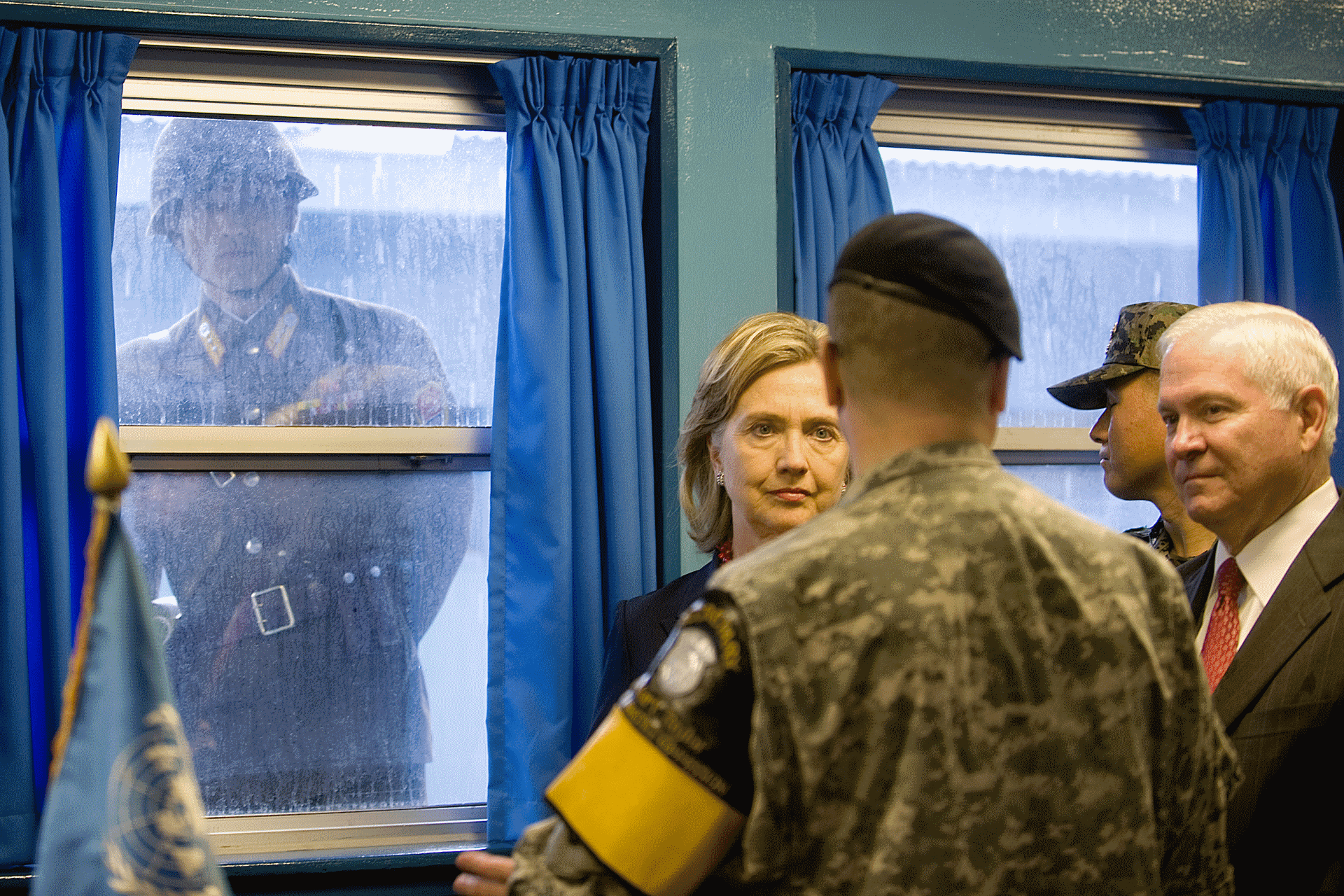
Clinton and Secretary of Defense Robert Gates tour the DMZ on July 21, 2010.

In July 2010, Clinton visited Pakistan for the second time as secretary, announcing a large new U.S. economic assistance package to that country as well as a U.S.-led bilateral trade agreement between Pakistan and Afghanistan. She then traveled to Afghanistan for the Kabul Conference on the situation there, during which President Hamid Karzai vowed to implement much-promised legal, political, and economic reforms in exchange for a continued Western commitment there. Clinton said that despite the scheduled U.S. drawdown there in 2011, the U.S. has "no intention of abandoning our long-term mission of achieving a stable, secure, peaceful Afghanistan. Too many nations – especially Afghanistan – have suffered too many losses to see this country slide backward." She then went on to Seoul and the Korean Demilitarized Zone where she and Defense Secretary Robert Gates met with South Korean Foreign Minister Yu Myung-hwan and Minister of National Defense Kim Tae-young in a '2+2 meeting' to commemorate the 60th anniversary of the Korean War. There she said that the U.S. experience in staying in Korea for decades had led to a successful result, which might also be applicable to Afghanistan. Finally, she went to Hanoi, Vietnam, for the ASEAN Regional Forum, wrapping up what The New York Times termed "a grueling trip that amounted to a tour of American wars, past and present". There she injected the U.S. into the long-running disputes over the sovereignty of the Paracel Islands and Spratly Islands, much to the displeasure of the Chinese who view the South China Sea as part of their core interests, by saying "The United States has a national interest in freedom of navigation, open access to Asia's maritime commons and respect for international law in the South China Sea."

By this time, Secretary Clinton was quite busy with another role of a kind, "M.O.T.B." as she wrote in State Department memos, making reference to her being the mother of the bride in daughter Chelsea Clinton's July 31, 2010, wedding to Marc Mezvinsky. She confessed in an interview in Islamabad less than two weeks before the wedding that she and her husband were both nervous wrecks, and that "You should assume that if he makes it down the aisle in one piece it's going to be a major accomplishment. He is going to be so emotional, as am I." The event itself gained a large amount of media attention.

In a September 2010 speech before the Council on Foreign Relations, Clinton emphasized the continuing primacy of American power and involvement in the world, declaring a "new American moment". Making reference to actions from reviving the Middle East talks to U.S. aid following the 2010 Pakistan floods, Clinton said that "The world is counting on us" and that "After years of war and uncertainty, people are wondering what the future holds, at home and abroad. So let me say it clearly: The United States can, must, and will lead in this new century."

With Democrats facing possible large losses in the 2010 midterm elections and President Obama struggling in opinion polls, idle speculation in Washington media circles concerning Obama's chances in the 2012 presidential election led to the notion that Clinton would take over as Obama's vice-presidential running mate in 2012 to add to his electoral appeal. Some versions of this idea had Vice President Biden replacing her as Secretary of State if Obama won. That it would ever happen was unlikely, but did not stop the chatter; when the job swap idea was mentioned in public to Clinton, she smiled and shook her head. A couple of months later, Obama shot down the idea, saying the notion was "completely unfounded" and that "they are both doing outstanding jobs where they are." (In late 2011, however, with Obama's popularity on the decline, White House Chief of Staff William M. Daley did conduct some research into the idea of Clinton replacing Biden, but the notion was dropped when the results showed no appreciable improvement for Obama.)

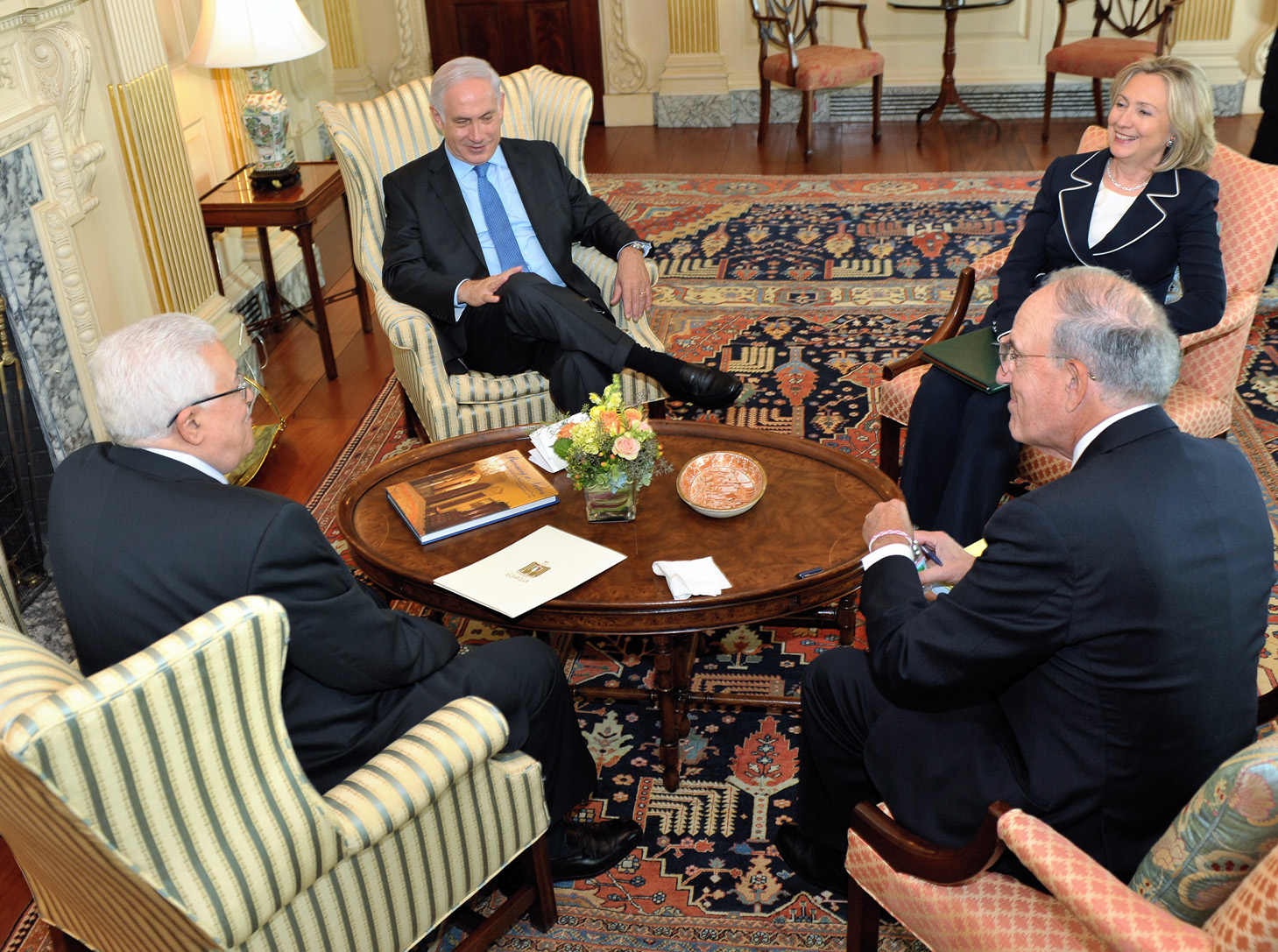
Clinton at the Department of State building with President Mahmoud Abbas of the Palestinian Authority, Prime Minister Benjamin Netanyahu of Israel, and U.S. Special Envoy George J. Mitchell, at the start of direct talks on September 2, 2010

Over the summer of 2010, the stalled Israeli–Palestinian peace process was potentially revived when the various parties involved agreed to direct talks for the first time in a while. While President Obama was the orchestrator of the movement, Secretary Clinton had gone through months of cajoling just to get the parties to the table, and helped convince the reluctant Palestinians by getting support for direct talks from Egypt and Jordan. She then assumed a prominent role in the talks; Speaking at a September 2 meeting at the State Department between Prime Minister Benjamin Netanyahu of Israel and President Mahmoud Abbas of the Palestinian Authority, she acknowledged that, "We've been here before, and we know how difficult the road ahead will be." Her role in the ongoing talks would be to take over from U.S. Special Envoy for Middle East Peace George J. Mitchell when discussions threatened to break down. The talks were generally given little chance to succeed, and Clinton faced the history of many such past failures, including the near miss of her husband at the 2000 Camp David Summit. Nevertheless, her prominent role in them thrust her further into the international spotlight and had the potential to affect her legacy as secretary.

In October, Clinton embarked on a seven-nation tour of Asia and Oceania. In New Zealand she signed the "Wellington Declaration", which normalized the diplomatic and military relationship between it and the United States. The signing marked twenty-five years after the United States suspended ANZUS treaty obligations with New Zealand in the wake of the USS Buchanan incident.

Clinton maintained her high approval ratings during 2010. An aggregation of polls taken during the late portion or all of 2010 showed that Clinton (and her husband as well) had by far the best favorable-unfavorable ratings of any key contemporary American political figure.

In late November, WikiLeaks released confidential State Department cables, selections of which were then published by several major newspapers around the world. The leak of the cables led to a crisis atmosphere in the State Department, as blunt statements and assessments by U.S. and foreign diplomats became public. Clinton led the damage control effort for the U.S. abroad, and also sought to bolster the morale of shocked Foreign Service officers. In the days leading up to the publication of the cables, Clinton called officials in Germany, Saudi Arabia, the United Arab Emirates, Britain, France, Afghanistan, Canada, and China to alert them to the pending disclosures. She did note that some foreign leaders were accepting of the frank language of the cables, with one telling her, "Don't worry about it. You should see what we say about you." She harshly criticized WikiLeaks, saying: "Let's be clear: This disclosure is not just an attack on America's foreign policy interests. It is an attack on the international community – the alliances and partnerships, the conversations and negotiations that safeguard global security and advance economic prosperity." The State Department went into immediate "war room" mode in order to deal with the effects of the disclosures, and began implementing measures to try to prevent another such leak from happening in the future.

A few of the cables released by WikiLeaks concerned Clinton directly: they revealed that directions to members of the foreign service had gone out in 2009 under Clinton's name to gather biometric details on foreign diplomats, including officials of the United Nations and U.S. allies. These included Internet and intranet usernames, e-mail addresses, web site URLs useful for identification, credit card numbers, frequent flier account numbers, work schedules, and other targeted biographical information in a process known as the National Humint Collection Directive. State Department spokesman Philip J. Crowley said that Clinton had not drafted the directive and that the Secretary of State's name is systematically attached to the bottom of cables originating from Washington; it was unclear whether Clinton had actually seen them. The guidance in the cables was actually written by the CIA before being sent out under Clinton's name, as the CIA cannot directly instruct State Department personnel. The disclosed cables on the more aggressive intelligence gathering went back to 2008 when they went out under Condoleezza Rice's name during her tenure as Secretary of State. The practice of the U.S. and the State Department gathering intelligence on the U.N. or on friendly nations was not new, but the surprise in this case was that it was done by other diplomats rather than intelligence agencies, and that the specific types of information being asked for went beyond past practice and was not the kind of information diplomats would normally be expected to gather. In any case, the instructions given in these cables may have been largely ignored by American diplomats as ill-advised. Responding to calls from WikiLeaks founder Julian Assange and a few others that Clinton possibly step down from her post due to the revelation, White House Press Secretary Robert Gibbs said, "I think that is absurd and ridiculous. I think Secretary of State Clinton is doing a wonderful job."

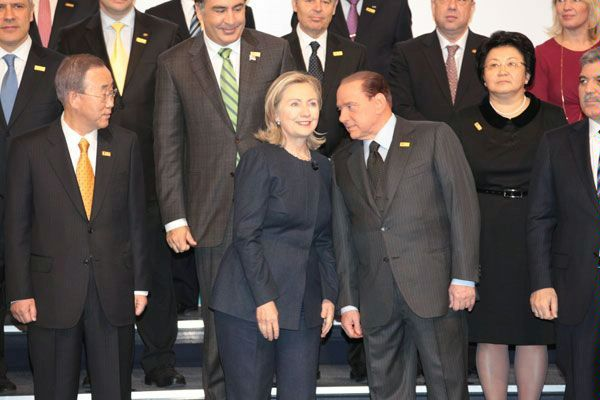
At this early December 2010 summit in Kazakhstan, Clinton dealt with the fallout from the United States diplomatic cables leak.

On December 1, Clinton flew to a summit of the Organization for Security and Co-operation in Europe in Astana, Kazakhstan. There she would encounter some fifty leaders who were subjects of embarrassing comments in the leaks, including President of Kazakhstan Nursultan Nazarbayev. A Kazakh official said that during such encounters, Clinton "kept her face. She didn't run away from difficult questions." During the encounters she emphasized that the leaked cables did not reflect official U.S. policy but rather were just instances of individual diplomats giving unfiltered feedback to Washington about what they saw happening in other countries. The situation led to some leaders turning her strong remarks about Internet freedom earlier in the year back against her. The OSCE summit also featured a meeting between Secretary Clinton and Ban Ki-moon, Secretary-General of the United Nations. In an attempt to repair the strain caused by the Humint spying revelations, Clinton expressed regret to Ban for the disclosures, but did not make an apology per se. A U.N. statement relayed that Ban thanked Clinton "for clarifying the matter and for expressing her concern about the difficulties created."

Upon the December 13 death of veteran U.S. diplomat Richard Holbrooke (who had initially fallen ill during a meeting with her), Clinton presided over a spontaneous gathering of some forty senior State Department personnel and Holbrooke aides at George Washington University Hospital, reminiscing about him. At a memorial service for him days later, both Clinton and her husband praised Holbrooke's work, and she said, "Everything that we have accomplished that is working in Afghanistan and Pakistan is largely because of Richard." As it happened, however, Holbrooke had developed poor relations with the White House during his time as Afghanistan envoy, and Clinton's vision of him forging an agreement in that country that modeled the success of his prior Dayton Accords (that resolved the Bosnian War) were unrealized.

On December 22, 2010, Secretary Clinton returned to the floor of the Senate during the lame-duck session of the 111th Congress to witness the ratification, by a 71–26 margin, of the New START treaty. Clinton had spent the several days beforehand repeatedly calling wavering senators and seeking to gain their support.

As the year closed, Clinton was again named by Americans in Gallup's most admired man and woman poll as the woman around the world they most admired; it was her ninth win in a row and fifteenth overall.

=== 2011 ===
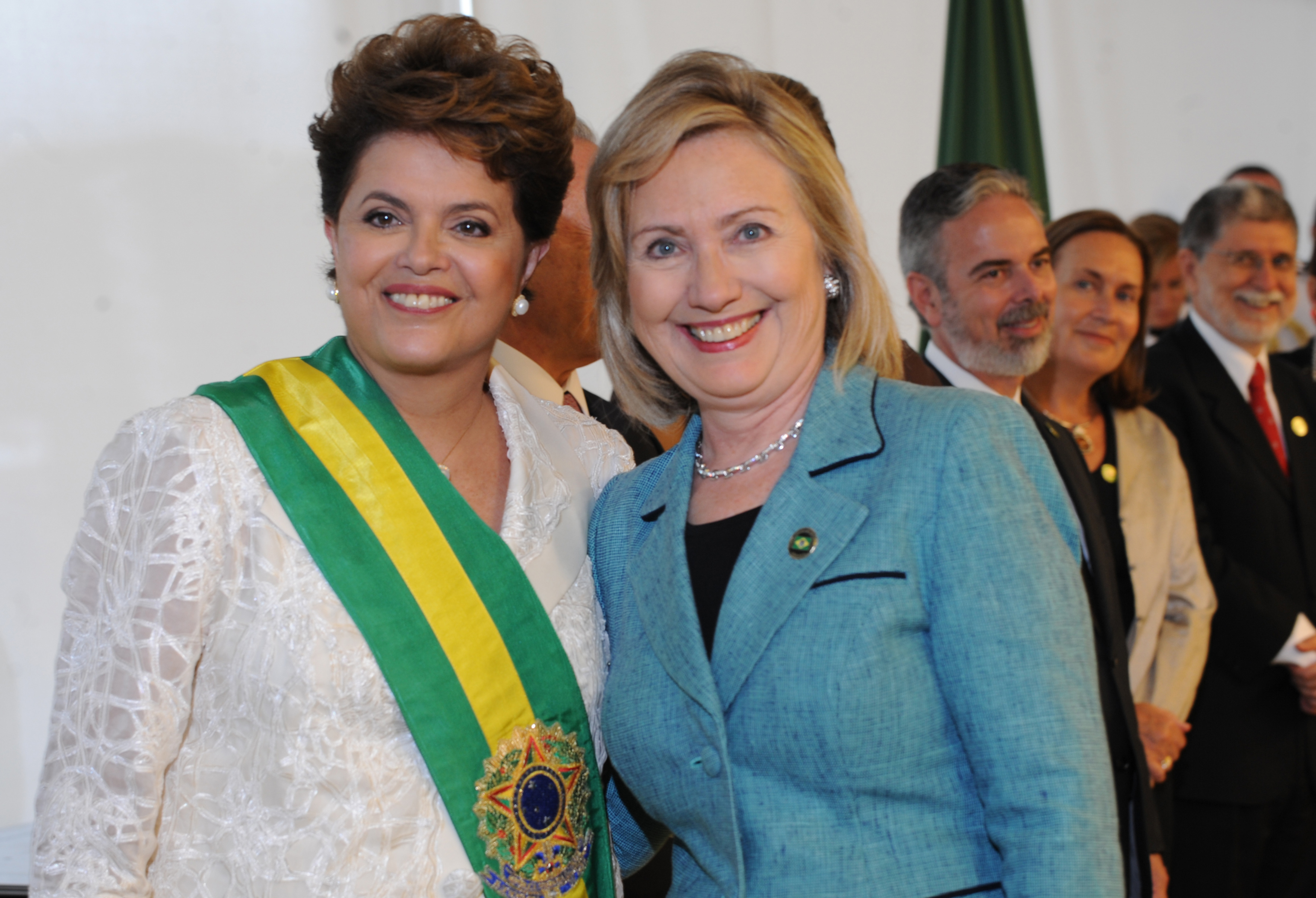
Clinton and President of Brazil Dilma Rousseff at the inauguration of Dilma Rousseff, January 1, 2011.

Secretary Clinton began the year 2011 abroad, attending the inauguration of Dilma Rousseff in Brazil, having been sent by President Obama to represent the U.S. Rousseff was the first woman to serve as that country's head of state. While there, she ran into Venezuelan ruler and U.S. antagonist Hugo Chávez, but the two had a pleasant exchange; Chávez said "She had a very spontaneous smile and I greeted her with the same effusiveness."

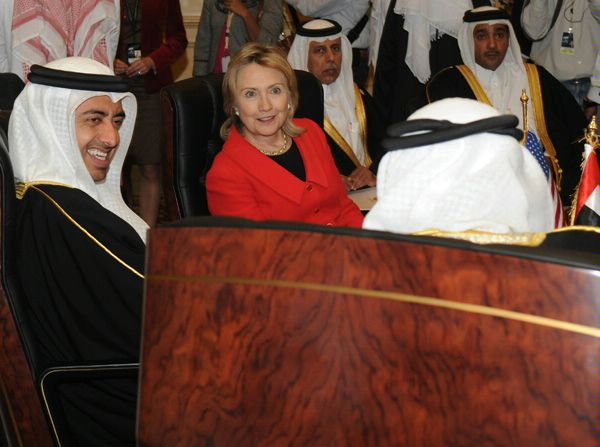
Secretary Clinton conversing with United Arab Emirates Foreign Minister Sheikh Abdullah bin Zayed al-Nahyan prior to a Gulf Cooperation Council meeting in Doha in January 2011.

In mid-January, Clinton made a four-country trip to the Middle East, visiting Yemen, Oman, The United Arab Emirates, and Qatar. Speaking at a conference in Doha, she criticized Arab governments' failure to move more rapidly vis à vis reform in unusually blunt language, saying, "In too many places, in too many ways, the region's foundations are sinking into the sand. The new and dynamic Middle East that I have seen needs firmer ground if it is to take root and grow everywhere." Her visit to Yemen, the first such visit by a Secretary of State in 20 years, found her focusing on the dangers of terrorism emanating from that country. An impromptu tour around the walled old city of Sana'a found Clinton being cheered by onlooking schoolchildren. A trip and fall while boarding the departing airplane left Clinton unhurt but news services making predictable witticisms.

When the 2011 Egyptian protests began, Clinton was in the forefront of the administration's response. Her initial public assessment on January 25 that the government of President Hosni Mubarak was "stable" and "looking for ways to respond to the legitimate needs and interests of the Egyptian people" soon came under criticism for being tepid and behind the curve of developing events, although others agreed that the U.S. could not be out front in undermining the government of a long-term ally. By the next day, Clinton was criticizing the Egyptian government's blocking of social media sites. By January 29, Obama had put Clinton in charge of sorting out the administration's so-far confused response to developments. During the frenetic day of January 30, she combined appearances on all five Sunday morning talk shows – where she stated publicly for the first time the U.S.'s view that there needed to be an "orderly transition" to a "democratic participatory government" and a "peaceful transition to real democracy", not Mubarak's "faux democracy". This was interrupted by her visit to Haiti for the purpose of pressuring the president of Haiti into complying with US-funded intervention in presidential elections.

The 2011 Haitian elections are widely considered to be illegitimate due to international intervention, made possible by the actions of Hillary Clinton and other actors. Clinton strongly urged compliance with OAS election recommendations, none of which included what 45 Democrats considered to be the most important barrier to democracy in Haiti in a petition to the Secretary of State. According to the Prime Minister at the time, "We tried to resist and did, until the visit of Hillary Clinton. That was when Préval understood he had no way out and accepted." The recommendations of the US-funded OAS mission, which removed the president's chosen candidate in favor of an elite-associated candidate, were later found to be incorrect. Wikileaks emails reveal Hillary Clinton's awareness of State Department staff activity, which included messages that discussed strategic influence of the Haitian public's opinion regarding the ongoing election. It is worth noting that in 2009, Hillary Clinton's State Department pressured René Préval into reneging on a law that raised minimum wage by 37 cents. The US embassy instructed Levi's, Fruit of the Loom, and Hanes to aggressively oppose the law.

The Egyptian protests became the most critical foreign policy crisis so far for the Obama administration, and Obama came to increasingly rely upon Clinton for advice and connections. Clinton had known Mubarak for some twenty years, and had formed a close relationship with Egyptian First Lady Suzanne Mubarak by supporting the latter's human rights work. Clinton originated the idea of sending Frank G. Wisner as an emissary to Cairo, to tell Mubarak not to seek another term as the country's leader. As Mubarak's response to the protests became violent in early February, Clinton strongly condemned the actions taking place, especially those against journalists covering the events, and urged new Egyptian Vice President Omar Suleiman to conduct an official investigation to hold those responsible for the violence accountable. When Wisner baldly stated that Mubarak's departure should be delayed to accommodate an orderly transition to another government, Clinton rebuked him, but shared a bit of the same sentiment. Mubarak did finally step down on February 11 as the protests became the 2011 Egyptian revolution. Clinton said that the U.S. realized that Egypt still had much work and some difficult times ahead of it. In mid-March, Clinton visited Egypt and indicated support for an Egyptian move towards democracy, but she avoided specific issues of U.S. aid and when elections should take place.

President Obama was reportedly unhappy with U.S. intelligence agencies following their failure to foresee the 2010–2011 Tunisian uprising and the downfall of Zine El Abidine Ben Ali as well as the Egyptian protests. Responding to criticism that the State Department had failed to see the developments in Egypt coming, Clinton defended the U.S. in an interview on Al-Arabiya, saying "I don't think anybody could have predicted we'd be sitting here talking about the end of the Mubarak presidency at the time that this all started."

Reflecting on not just the situation in Tunisia and Egypt but also on the 2011 Yemeni protests, and the 2011 Jordanian protests, Clinton said at a February 5 meeting of the Quartet on the Middle East, "The region is being battered by a perfect storm of powerful trends. ... This is what has driven demonstrators into the streets of ... cities throughout the region. The status quo is simply not sustainable." She said that while transition to democracy could be chaotic – and free elections had to be accompanied by free speech, a free judiciary, and the rule of law in order to be effective – in the end "free people govern themselves best". The transformations highlighted that traditional U.S. foreign policy in the region had sided with rulers who suppressed internal dissent but provided stability and generally supported U.S. goals in the region. When the monarchy's response to the 2011 Bahraini protests turned violent, Clinton urged a return to the path of reform, saying that violence against the protesters "is absolutely unacceptable ... We very much want to see the human rights of the people protected, including right to assemble, right to express themselves, and we want to see reform." At the same time, she said that the U.S. "cannot tell countries what they are going to do [and] cannot dictate the outcomes." As the situation in Bahrain lingered on and continued to have episodes of violence against protesters, Clinton said in mid-March, "Our goal is a credible political process that can address the legitimate aspirations of all the people of Bahrain ... Violence is not and cannot be the answer. A political process is. We have raised our concerns about the current measures directly with Bahraini officials and will continue to do so."

When the 2011 Libyan civil war began in mid-February and intensified into armed conflict with rebel successes in early March 2011, Clinton stated the administration's position that Libyan leader Muammar Gaddafi "must go now, without further violence or delay". As Gaddafi conducted counterattacks against the rebels, Clinton was initially reluctant, as was Obama, to back calls being made in various quarters for imposition of a Libyan no-fly zone. However, as the prospects of a Gaddafi victory and possible subsequent bloodbath that would kill many thousands emerged, and as Clinton traveled Europe and North Africa and found support for military intervention increasing among European and Arab leaders, she had a change of view. Together with Ambassador to the U.N. Susan Rice and National Security Council figure Samantha Power, who were already supporting military intervention, Clinton overcame opposition from Defense Secretary Robert Gates, security advisor Thomas Donilon, and counterterrorism advisor John Brennan, and the administration backed U.N. action to impose the no-fly zone and authorize other military actions as necessary. Clinton helped gain the financial and political support of several Arab countries, in particular convincing Qatar, the United Arab Emirates, and Jordan that a no-fly zone urged by the Arab League would not be sufficient and that air-to-ground attacks would be necessary. Clinton then persuaded Russian Foreign Minister Sergey Lavrov that his country should abstain on the UN resolution authorizing force against Gaddafi, and Rice and Clinton played major roles in getting the rest of the United Nations Security Council to approve United Nations Security Council Resolution 1973. Regarding whether the U.S. or some other ally would send arms to the anti-Gaddafi forces, Clinton said that this would be permissible under the resolution, but that no decision had yet been made on doing so.

Clinton testified to Congress in March that the administration did not need congressional authorization for its military intervention in Libya or for further decisions about it, despite congressional objections from members of both parties that the administration was violating the War Powers Resolution. During that classified briefing to Congress, she allegedly indicated that the administration would sidestep the Resolution's provision regarding a 60-day limit on unauthorized military actions. Months later, she stated that, with respect to the military operation in Libya, the United States was still flying a quarter of the sorties, and The New York Times reported that, while many presidents had bypassed other sections of the War Powers Resolution, there was little precedent for exceeding the 60-day statutory limit on unauthorized military actions – a limit which the Justice Department had said in 1980 was constitutional. The State Department publicly took the position in June 2011 that there was no "hostility" in Libya within the meaning of the War Powers Resolution, contrary to legal interpretations by the Department of Defense and the Department of Justice Office of Legal Counsel. The State Department requested (but never received) express Congressional authorization. The US House of Representatives voted to rebuke the administration for maintaining an American presence with the NATO operations in Libya, which they considered a violation of the War Powers Resolution.

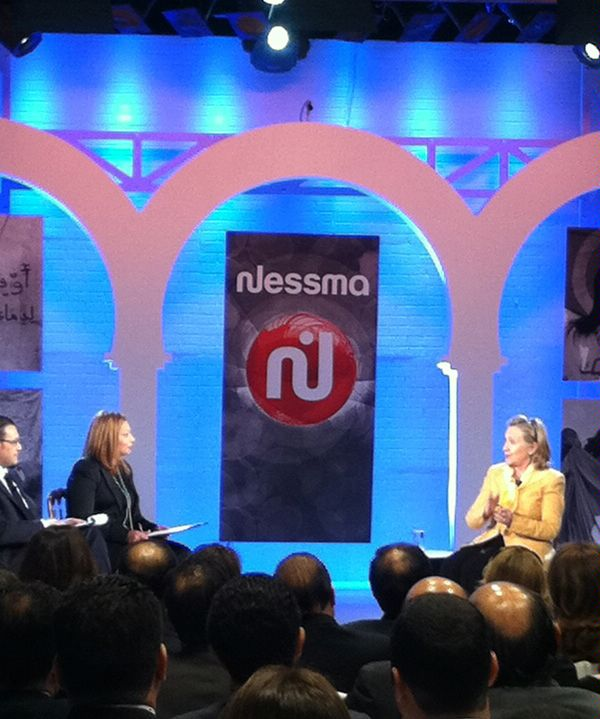
Secretary Clinton appearing on Nessma TV in Tunis in March 2011

While Clinton recognized some of the contradictions of U.S. policy towards turmoil in the Mideast countries, which involving backing some regimes while supporting protesters against others, she was nevertheless passionate on the subject, enough so that Obama joked at the annual Gridiron Dinner that "I've dispatched Hillary to the Middle East to talk about how these countries can transition to new leaders—though, I've got to be honest, she's gotten a little passionate about the subject. These past few weeks it's been tough falling asleep with Hillary out there on Pennsylvania Avenue shouting, throwing rocks at the window." In any case, Obama's reference to Clinton travelling a lot was true enough; by now she had logged 465,000 miles (748,000 km) in her Boeing 757, more than any other Secretary of State for a comparable period of time, and had visited 79 countries while in the office. Time magazine wrote that "Clinton's endurance is legendary" and that she would still be going at the end of long work days even as her staff members were glazing out. The key was her ability to fall asleep on demand, at any time and place, for power naps.

Clinton also saw the potential political changes in the Mideast as an opportunity for an even more fundamental change to take place, that being the empowerment of women (something Newsweek magazine saw as Clinton's categorical imperative). She made remarks to this effect in countries such as Egypt – "If a country doesn't recognize minority rights and human rights, including women's rights, you will not have the kind of stability and prosperity that is possible" – as well as in Yemen, where she spoke of the story of the present Nujood Ali and her campaign against forced marriage at a young age. At home, Clinton was even more expansive, looking on a worldwide basis: "I believe that the rights of women and girls is the unfinished business of the 21st century. We see women and girls across the world who are oppressed and violated and demeaned and degraded and denied so much of what they are entitled to as our fellow human beings." She also maintained that the well-being of women in other countries was a direct factor in American self-interest: "This is a big deal for American values and for American foreign policy and our interests, but it is also a big deal for our security. Because where women are disempowered and dehumanized, you are more likely to see not just antidemocratic forces, but extremism that leads to security challenges for us." She subsequently elaborated upon this theme, saying "A lot of the work I do here in the State Department on women's or human-rights issues is not just because I care passionately – which I do – but because I see it as [a way] to increase security to fulfill American interests. These are foreign-policy and national-security priorities for me."

In the midst of this turmoil, which also included Clinton pledging government-level support to Japan in the wake of the devastating 2011 Tōhoku earthquake and tsunami, Clinton reiterated in a mid-March CNN interview with Wolf Blitzer during her post-revolution visit to Cairo's Tahrir Square that she had no interest in becoming Secretary of Defense or vice president or of running for president again. She also explicitly said for the first time that she did not want to serve a second term as Secretary of State if President Obama is re-elected in 2012. She stressed how much she regarded her current position: "Because I have the best job I could ever have. This is a moment in history where it is almost hard to catch your breath. There are both the tragedies and disasters that we have seen from Haiti to Japan and there are the extraordinary opportunities and challenges that we see right here in Egypt and in the rest of the region." But reportedly she was weary at times from constant travelling, still not part of Obama's inner circle, and looking forward to a time of less stress and the chances to write, teach, or work for international women's rights. She was not bound by her statements, and Blitzer for one suspected she would change her mind. In any case, she remained popular with the American public; her Gallup Poll favorability rating rose to 66 percent (against 31 percent unfavorable), her highest mark ever save for a period during the Clinton–Lewinsky scandal thirteen years earlier. Her favorability was 10 to 20 percentage points higher than those for Obama, Biden, or Gates, and reflected in part the high ratings that secretaries of state sometimes get.

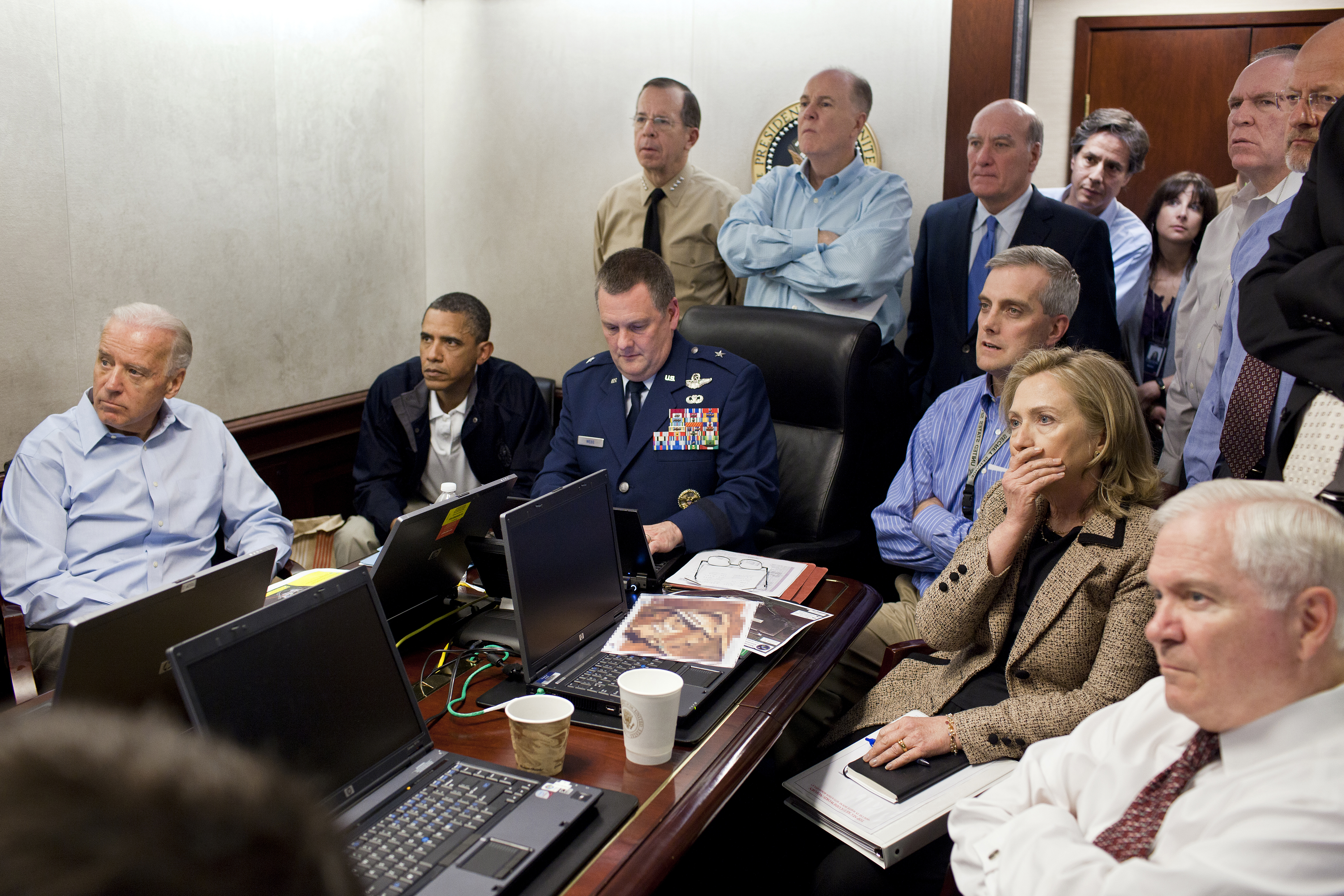
Secretary Clinton was among those in the White House Situation Room getting real-time updates on the May 2011 mission to kill Osama bin Laden.

Throughout early 2011, the CIA thought there was a good chance it had discovered the whereabouts of Osama bin Laden, and the White House held a final high-level discussion on April 28 about whether to go ahead with a raid to get him, and if so, what kind of mission to undertake. Clinton supported the option to send Navy SEALs in, believing that the U.S. could not afford to ignore this chance and that getting bin Laden was so important that it outweighed any risks. Following the successful May 1–2, 2011, U.S. mission to kill Osama bin Laden at his hideout compound in Abbottabad, Pakistan, and the resulting criticism from various Americans that Pakistan had not found, or had let, bin Laden hide in near plain sight, Clinton made a point of praising Pakistan's past record of helping the U.S. hunt down terrorists: "Our counter-terrorism cooperation over a number of years now, with Pakistan, has contributed greatly to our efforts to dismantle al-Qaeda. And in fact, cooperation with Pakistan helped lead us to bin Laden and the compound in which he was hiding. Going forward, we are absolutely committed to continuing that cooperation." Clinton then played a key role in the administration's decision not to release photographs of the dead bin Laden, reporting that U.S. allies in the Middle East did not favor the release and agreeing with Secretary Gates that such a release might cause an anti-U.S. backlash overseas.

A June 2011 trip to Africa found Clinton consoling longtime aide Huma Abedin after the Anthony Weiner sexting scandal broke. She also emphatically denied published reports that she was interested in becoming the next president of the World Bank, which would need a successor to follow Robert Zoellick after the end of his term in mid-2012. A different suggestion, from wanting-to-depart U.S. Secretary of the Treasury Timothy Geithner that Clinton replace him at that position, gained some traction in parts of the White House before economic and budget issues intensified and President Obama convinced Geithner to stay on.

By July, Clinton was assuring China and other foreign governments that the ongoing U.S. debt ceiling crisis would not end with the U.S. going into sovereign default (a prediction that turned true when the Budget Control Act of 2011 was passed and signed the day before default loomed). She spent much of that summer in an eventually unsuccessful attempt to persuade the Palestinian National Authority not to attempt to gain membership in the United Nations at its September 2011 General Assembly meeting.

Clinton continued to poll high, with a September 2011 Bloomberg News poll finding her with a 64 percent favorable rating, the highest of any political figure in the nation. A third of those polls said that Clinton would have been a better president than Obama, but when asked the likelihood she would stage a campaign against the president, she said, "It's below zero. One of the great things about being secretary of state is I am out of politics. I am not interested in being drawn back into it by anybody."

Following the October 2011 announcement by Obama that the withdrawal of U.S. troops from Iraq would complete by the close of that same year, Clinton forcefully defended the decision as emanating from an agreement originally signed with Iraq under the Bush administration and as evidence that Iraq's sovereignty was real, and said that despite the absence of military forces, the U.S. was still committed to strengthening Iraq's democracy with "robust" diplomatic measures. She also praised the effectiveness of Obama's foreign policy in general, implicitly pushing back on criticism from those running for the 2012 Republican presidential nomination.

Clinton specifically pointed to the death of Muammar Gaddafi and the conclusion of the Libyan intervention. She had been active during the final stages of the Libyan rebellion, and via Sheik Hamad bin Khalifa Al Thani, had urged the rebels forces to unify and avoid factional conflicts with each other. She visited Tripoli in October 2011 and, in private, was somewhat guarded about Libya's future following the rebel success. (A video of her exclaiming "Wow" upon first reading on her BlackBerry of Gaddafi's capture achieved wide circulation.) Over the next few years, the aftermath of the Libyan Civil War became characterized by instability, two rival governments, and a slide into status as a failed state; it became a refuge for extremists and terrorist groups, such as ISIL, and spurred a massive refugee crisis as immigrants crossed the Mediterranean to southern Europe. The wisdom of the intervention would continue to be debated, with President Obama maintaining that the intervention had been worthwhile but that the United States and Europe underestimated the ongoing effort needed to rebuild Libyan society afterward; former U.S. Representative to NATO Ivo Daalder stating that the limited goals of the intervention had all been met but that the Libyan people had not seized their opportunity to form a better future and that post-intervention military involvement by the West would have been counterproductive; and scholar Alan J. Kuperman (along with some other scholars and human rights groups) writing that the intervention had been based on the faulty notion that Libya had been headed towards humanitarian disaster when in fact it was not and was thus the intervention was "an abject failure, judged even by its own standards". Kuperman's view that Gaddafi son Saif al-Islam Gaddafi held promise as a Western-style political reformer was in turn disputed by former Assistant Secretary of Defense for International Security Affairs Derek Chollet, who stated that such faith was misplaced and that Libyans were resistant to any post-intervention security mechanism and to many rebuilding programs. Clinton said in her 2014 memoir that she had been "worried that the challenges ahead would prove overwhelming for even the most well-meaning transitional leaders. If the new government could consolidate its authority, provide security, use oil revenues to rebuild, disarm the militias, and keep extremists out, then Libya would have a fighting chance at building a stable democracy. If not, then the country would face very difficult challenges translating the hopes of a revolution into a free, secure, and prosperous future."

Secretary Clinton cancelled a planned trip to the United Kingdom and Turkey to be with her mother, Dorothy Rodham, who died in Washington on November 1, 2011.

In November 2011, Clinton declared, in both a speech at the East–West Center and in an article published in Foreign Policy magazine, that the 21st century would be "America's Pacific century". The term played on the notion of the "Pacific Century". Clinton said, "It is becoming increasingly clear that, in the 21st century, the world's strategic and economic center of gravity will be the Asia-Pacific, from the Indian subcontinent to western shores of the Americas." The declaration was part of the Obama administration's "pivot to Asia" after the focus of the decade of the 2000s on the wars in Afghanistan and Iraq.

When the 2011–2012 Russian protests had begun in late 2011, in response to the 2011 Russian legislative election, Clinton had been outspoken about the need for legitimate democratic processes there, saying in December 2011: "The Russian people, like people everywhere, deserve the right to have their voices heard and their votes counted. And that means they deserve free, fair, transparent elections and leaders who are accountable to them." She added that "Russian voters deserve a full investigation of electoral fraud and manipulation." In return, Russian Prime Minister Vladimir Putin denounced Clinton, accusing her of backing Russian protesters financially and in fact precipitating their actions: "They heard this signal and with the support of the U.S. State Department began their active work." When Putin won the 2012 Russian presidential election in March 2012, some in the State Department wanted to denounce Russian process again, but they were overruled by the White House, and Clinton stated simply that "The election had a clear winner, and we are ready to work with President-elect Putin."

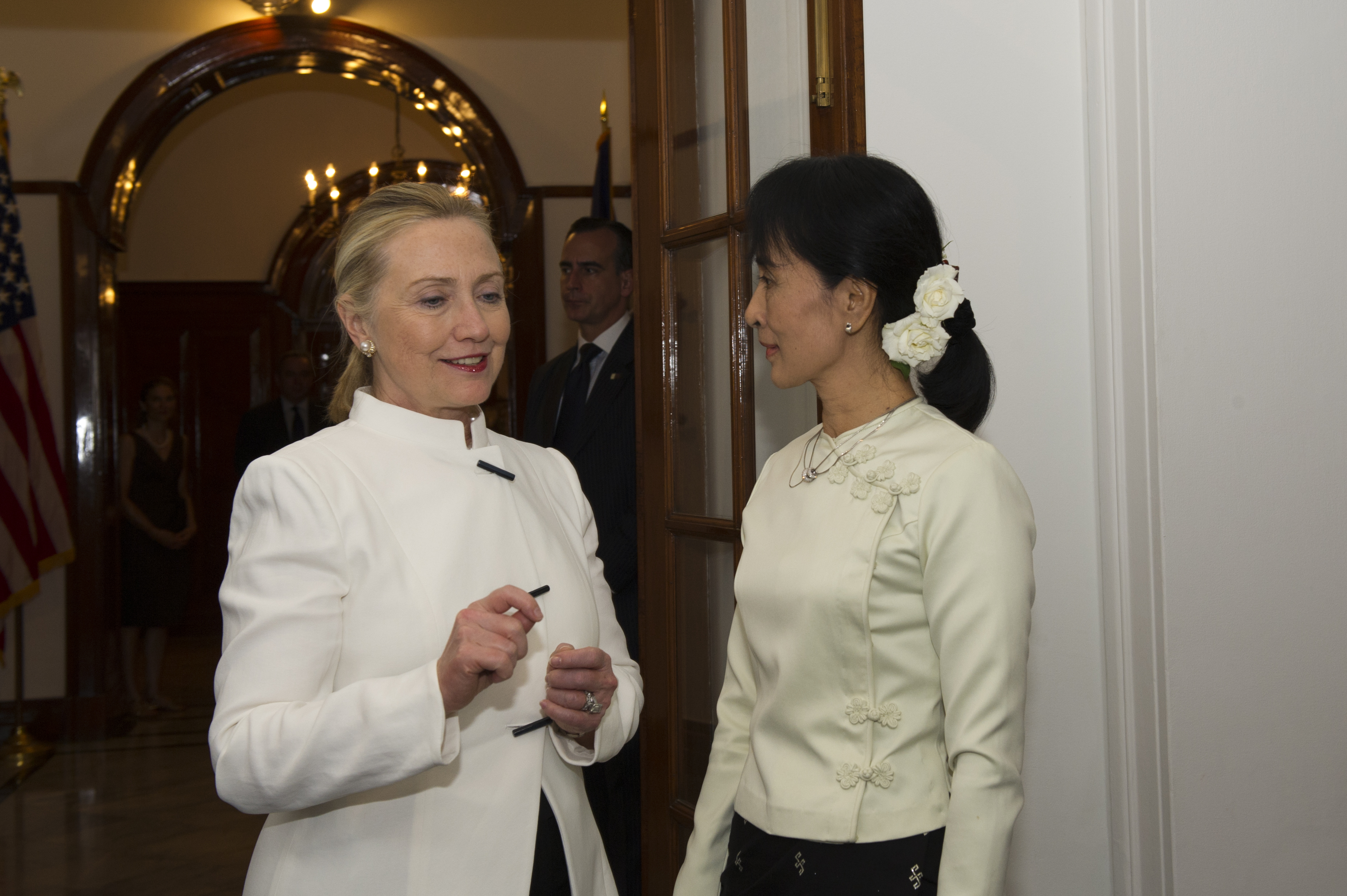
Secretary Clinton met with Burmese democracy leader Aung San Suu Kyi on December 2, 2011, as part of her historic visit to that country.

In early December 2011, Clinton made the first visit to Burma by a U.S. secretary of state since John Foster Dulles's in 1955, as she met with Burmese leaders as well as opposition leader Aung San Suu Kyi and sought to support the 2011 Burmese democratic reforms. Clinton said that due to the direct and indirect communications she had had with Suu Kyi over the years, "it was like seeing a friend you hadn't seen for a very long time even though it was our first meeting." The outreach to Burma attracted both praise and criticism, with Congresswoman Ileana Ros-Lehtinen saying it "sends the wrong signal to the Burmese military thugs" but others saying the visit combined idealism with respect to reform and realpolitik with respect to keeping Burma out of the direct Chinese sphere of influence. Clinton had had to overcome internal administration opposition from the White House and Pentagon, as well as from Senate minority leader Mitch McConnell, to make the move, eventually making a personal appeal to Obama and gaining his approval. Regarding whether the Burmese regime would follow up on reform pledges, Clinton said, "I can't predict what's going to happen, but I think it certainly is important for the United States to be on the side of democratic reform ... This is a first date, not a marriage, and we'll see where it leads." She continued to address rights concerns in a December 2011 speech a few days later before the United Nations Human Rights Council, saying that the U.S. would advocate for gay rights abroad and that "Gay rights are human rights" and that "It should never be a crime to be gay." This itself drew criticism from some American social conservatives.

As the year closed, Clinton was again named by Americans in Gallup's most admired man and woman poll as the woman around the world they most admired; it was her tenth win in a row and sixteenth overall.

=== 2012 ===
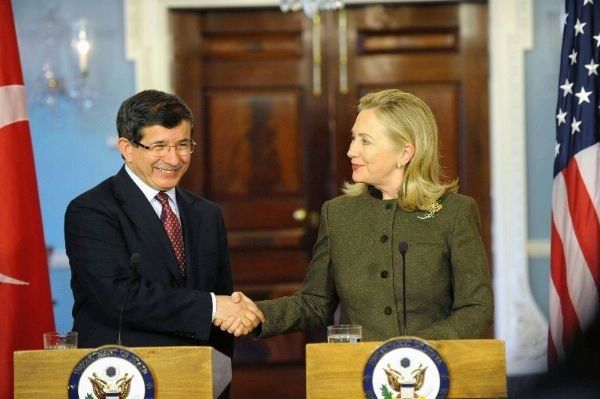
Secretary Clinton and Turkish Foreign Minister Ahmet Davutoglu following their bilateral meeting at the Department of State, February 13, 2012.

In a State Department town hall meeting on January 26, 2012, Clinton indicated her desire to remove herself from "the high wire of American politics" after twenty tiring years of being on it and added, "I have made it clear that I will certainly stay on until the president nominates someone and that transition can occur." She also indicated that she had not watched any of the 2012 Republican Party presidential debates.

As the Syrian Civil War continued and intensified with the February 2012 bombardment of Homs, the U.S. sought a UN Security Council resolution that backed an Arab League plan that would urge Syrian President Bashar al-Assad to relinquish powers to the vice presidential level and permit a unity government to form. However, Russia and China vetoed the resolution, an action that Clinton characterized as a "travesty". After the failure of the effort, Clinton warned that Syria could degenerate into "a brutal civil war" and called for a "friends of democratic Syria" group of like-minded nations to promote a peaceful and democratic solution to the situation and pressure Syria accordingly. At a meeting in Tunis of the consequent Friends of Syria Group, Clinton again criticized the actions of Russia and China as "distressing" and "despicable", and predicted that the Assad regime would meet its end via a military coup. Later, during the summer of 2012, she repeated her criticism of those two countries. At that time, Clinton developed a plan with CIA Director David H. Petraeus to send arms to, and perform training of, vetted groups of Syrian rebels, using the assistance of a neighboring state. The plan also had the support of Defense Secretary Leon E. Panetta and Joint Chiefs chair General Martin E. Dempsey. Reluctant to become entangled in the Syrian situation and in an election campaign, Obama rejected the idea.

Clinton has visited 112 countries during her tenure, the most of any Secretary of State in U.S. history.

In February 2012, a spokesman for Clinton denied again that Clinton wanted the president of the World Bank job, saying, "She has said this is not happening. Her view has not changed."

At a keynote speech before the International Crisis Group, the secretary brought her view regarding the empowerment of women specifically into the area of peacemaking, saying that women's multifaceted ties with a community make them more compelled to concern about social and quality of life issues that prosper under peacetime conditions. Furthermore, women identify more with minority groups, being discriminated against themselves. Thus, "Women are the largest untapped reservoir of talent in the world. It is past time for women to take their rightful place, side by side with men, in the rooms where the fates of peoples, where their children's and grandchildren's fates, are decided." She also continued to believe that empowerment of women would continue to grow as people saw that it would lead to economic growth.

In April 2012, an Internet meme "Texts from Hillary", posted on Tumblr and based around a photograph of Clinton sitting on a military plane wearing sunglasses and using a mobile phone, imagined the recipients and contents of her text messages. It became suddenly popular and earned the endorsement of Clinton herself, before being brought to an end by its creators. Obama himself took note of the meme's popularity, in a humorous exchange that revealed the ease the two now had around one another. Around the same time, a photograph taken during the 6th Summit of the Americas in Cartagena, Colombia, showed Clinton with a group of colleagues relaxing, drinking Águila beer from a bottle and dancing, at a local nightclub. The episode gained front-page attention from the New York Post and illustrated how Clinton was enjoying the job. Regarding her ongoing popularity, Clinton said, "There's a certain consistency to who I am and what I do, and I think people have finally said, 'Well, you know, I kinda get her now.'" One long-time Washington figure summarized the situation by simply saying, "There's no coin in criticizing her anymore." At the same time, her fashion choices gained renewed attention, with her hair grown long and sometimes pulled back with scrunchies. Public commentary on Clinton's hair was now a tradition across twenty years, but as one female State Department traveller said, "As a chick, it's a big pain in the butt. The weather is different, and you're in and out of the plane. [The staff] gets off that plane looking like garbage most days, but she has to look camera ready. She said the reason she grew her hair long was that it's easier. She has options." Clinton professed she was past the point of concern on the matter: "I feel so relieved to be at the stage I'm at in my life right now, [...] because if I want to wear my glasses, I'm wearing my glasses. If I want to pull my hair back, I'm pulling my hair back." In any case, Clinton showed a much more relaxed attitude vis a vis the press than in past eras.

A late April/early May 2012 trip to China found Clinton in the middle of a drama involving blind Chinese dissident Chen Guangcheng. He had escaped house arrest and, after finding his way to the Embassy of the United States, Beijing, requested an arrangement whereby he could stay in China with guarantees for his safety. After a deal towards that end fell through, he requested a seat on Clinton's plane when she flew back to the U.S. After further negotiations in parallel with the existing agenda of Clinton's trip, Chen left for the U.S. after Clinton's departure. Clinton had negotiated personally with senior Chinese diplomat Dai Bingguo in order to get the deal back in place. Despite an environment that had, as one aide said, "exploded into an absolute circus", Clinton managed to find a path for the U.S. that kept China from losing face and kept the overall agenda of the meetings intact.

Following the June 2012 killing of high-ranking al Qaeda figure Abu Yahya al-Libi in one of the U.S. drone attacks in Pakistan, Clinton defended the action, saying "We will always maintain our right to use force against groups such as al Qaeda that have attacked us and still threaten us with imminent attack. In doing so, we will comply with the applicable law, including the laws of war, and go to extraordinary lengths to ensure precision and avoid the loss of innocent life." Indeed, beginning with her 2009 trip to Pakistan, Clinton had faced questions about U.S. drone strikes, which she refused to comment much upon at the time. Behind the scenes, Clinton was in fact one of the leading administration proponents of continuing and expanding the strikes there and elsewhere. She did, however, side with U.S. Ambassador to Pakistan Cameron Munter in 2011 when he requested more input into, and control over, the U.S. "kill list" selections for that country.

In June 2012, Clinton set down in Riga, Latvia, which represented the 100th country she had visited during her tenure, setting a mark for secretaries of state; the record had been Madeleine Albright with 96. In July 2012, Clinton became the first U.S. Secretary of State to visit Laos since John Foster Dulles in 1955. She held talks with Prime Minister Thongsing Thammavong and Foreign Minister Thongloun Sisoulith in Vientiane.

Also in July 2012, Clinton visited Egypt for the first time since Mohammed Morsi became the first democratically elected president of the country. As she arrived in the country, her convoy was met with a protest and had shoes, tomatoes and bottled water thrown at it, although nothing hit either Clinton or her vehicle. Protesters also chanted "Monica, Monica", in reference to the Clinton–Lewinsky scandal. She also faced conspiracy theories that the U.S. was secretly aligned with the Muslim Brotherhood.

An advocate of ending Somalia's transitional phase on time, Clinton showed support in August for the new Federal Government of Somalia, which took over as the permanent government.

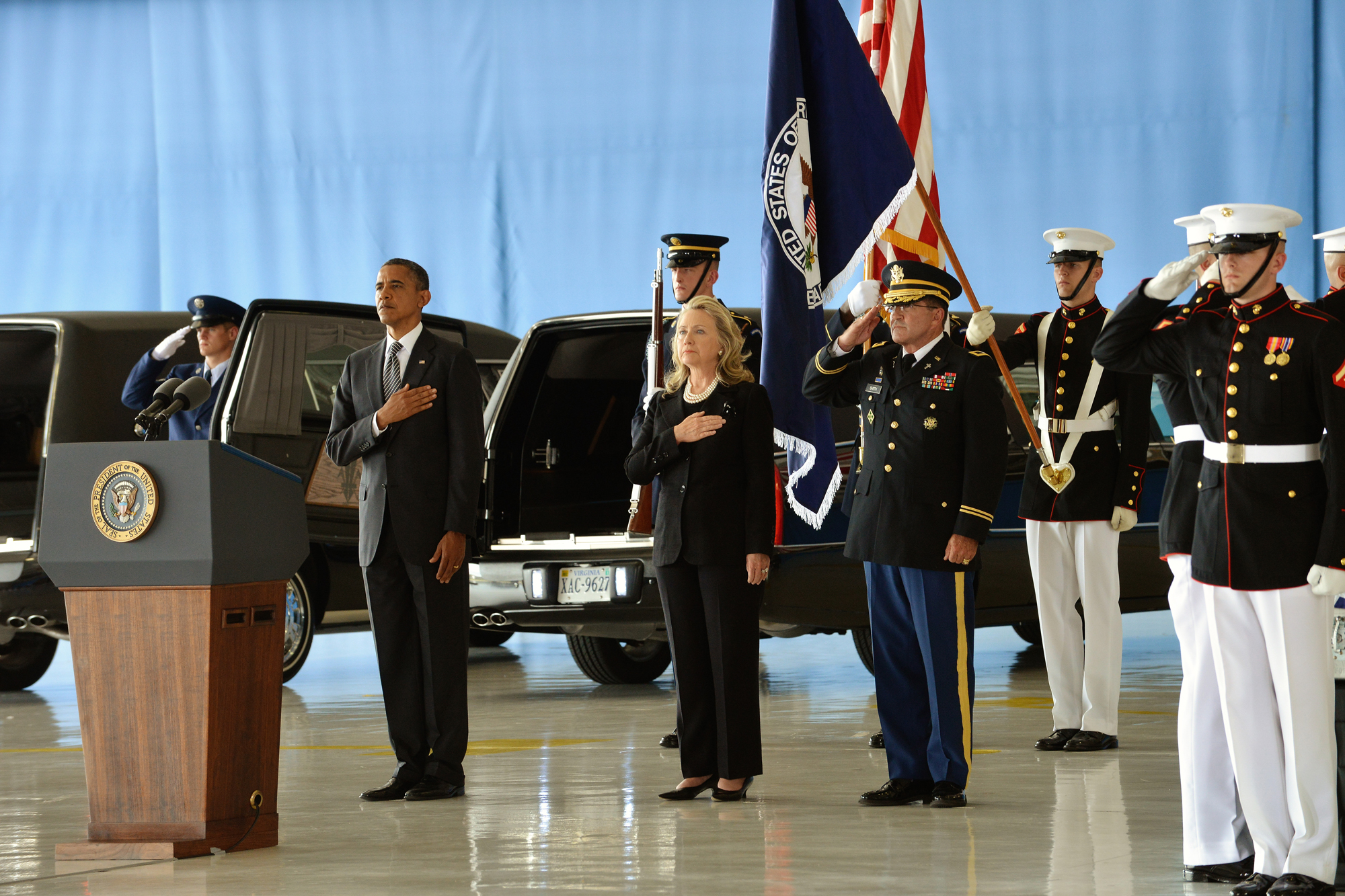
President Obama and Secretary Clinton honor the Benghazi victims at the Transfer of Remains Ceremony held at Andrews Air Force Base on September 14, 2012.

On September 11, 2012, an attack on the U.S. diplomatic mission in Benghazi took place, resulting in the death of U.S. Ambassador J. Christopher Stevens and three other Americans. The next day, Clinton also made a statement describing the perpetrators as "heavily armed militants" and "a small and savage group – not the people or government of Libya." Clinton also responded to the notion that the attack had been related to the reactions in Egypt and elsewhere to the anti-Islamic online video known as Innocence of Muslims, saying: "Some have sought to justify this vicious behavior as a response to inflammatory material posted on the internet. The United States deplores any intentional effort to denigrate the religious beliefs of others. But let me be clear: There is never any justification for violent acts of this kind." She and President Obama appearing together in the White House Rose Garden the same day and vowed to bring the attackers to justice. On September 14 the remains of the slain Americans were returned to the U.S. Obama and Clinton attended the ceremony; in her remarks, Clinton said, "One young woman, her head covered and her eyes haunted with sadness, held up a handwritten sign that said 'Thugs and killers don't represent Benghazi nor Islam.'"

The attack, and questions surrounding the U.S. Government's preparedness for it, and explanations for what had happened afterward, became a political firestorm in the U.S., especially in the context of the ongoing presidential election. The State Department had previously identified embassy and personnel security as a major challenge in its budget and priorities report. On the September 20, Clinton gave a classified briefing to U.S. Senators, which several Republican attendees criticized, angry at the Obama administration's rebuff of their attempts to learn details of the Benghazi attack, only to see that information published the next day in The New York Times and The Wall Street Journal. She did announce the formation of an Accountability Review Board panel, chaired by longtime diplomat Thomas R. Pickering and vice-chaired by retired Admiral and former Chairman of the Joint Chiefs of Staff Michael Mullen, to investigate the attack from the State Department's viewpoint.

On October 15, regarding the question of preparedness, Clinton said she was accountable: "I take responsibility. I'm in charge of the State Department's 60,000-plus people all over the world, 275 posts. ... I take this very personally. So we're going to get to the bottom of it, and then we're going to do everything we can to work to prevent it from happening again." Regarding the different explanations afterward for what had happened, she said, "In the wake of an attack like this, in the fog of war, there's always going to be confusion. And I think it is absolutely fair to say that everyone had the same intelligence. Everyone who spoke tried to give the information that they had. As time has gone on, that information has changed. We've gotten more detail, but that's not surprising. That always happens."

On November 6, 2012, Obama was re-elected for a second term as president. Clinton said shortly before the election that she would stay on until her successor was confirmed, but that "this is not an open-ended kind of time frame." Despite her continuing to express a lack of interest, speculation continued about Clinton as a possible candidate in the 2016 presidential election. A poll taken in Iowa, the first state in the nomination process, showed that in a hypothetical 2016 caucuses contest, Clinton would have 58 percent support, with Vice President Biden coming in next at 17 percent.

Later in November, Clinton traveled to Jerusalem, the West Bank, and Cairo, meeting with leaders Benjamin Netanyahu, Mahmoud Abbas and Mohamed Morsi respectively, in an effort to stop the 2012 Gaza conflict. On November 21, she participated in a joint appearance with Egyptian Foreign Minister Mohamed Kamel Amr to announce that a cease-fire agreement had been reached between Israel and Hamas in Gaza. When the 2012 Egyptian protests against Morsi broke out shortly thereafter, Clinton said that it showed how a dialogue between both sides was immediately needed on how to reshape that nation's constitution.

In mid-December, Clinton fell victim to a stomach virus contracted on a trip to Europe. She subsequently became very dehydrated and then fainted, suffering a mild concussion. As a result, she cancelled another trip and scratched an appearance at scheduled Congressional hearings on the Benghazi matter. A few conservative figures, including Congressman Allen West and Ambassador to the UN John R. Bolton, accused Clinton of fabricating her illness to avoid testifying, but a State Department spokesperson said that was "completely untrue" and Republican Senator Lindsey Graham denounced the allegations.

On December 19, the Pickering–Mullen Accountability Review Board report on the Benghazi matter was released. It was sharply critical of State Department officials in Washington for ignoring requests for more guards and safety upgrades, and for failing to adapt security procedures to a deteriorating security environment. It explicitly criticized the Bureau of Diplomatic Security and the Bureau of Near Eastern Affairs: "Systemic failures and leadership and management deficiencies at senior levels within two bureaus of the State Department ... resulted in a special mission security posture that was inadequate for Benghazi and grossly inadequate to deal with the attack that took place." Four State Department officials were removed from their posts as a consequence, including Assistant Secretary of State for Diplomatic Security Eric J. Boswell (who resigned completely), a deputy assistant secretary for embassy security, Charlene R. Lamb, and a deputy assistant secretary for North Africa, Raymond Maxwell. The report did not criticize more senior officials in the department; Pickering said: "We fixed it at the assistant secretary level, which is, in our view, the appropriate place to look, where the decision-making in fact takes place, where, if you like, the rubber hits the road." Clinton said in a letter to Congress that she accepted the conclusions of the Pickering–Mullen report, and a State Department task force was formed to implement some sixty action items recommended by the report. On December 20, the Deputy Secretary of State, William J. Burns, and the Deputy Secretary of State for Management and Resources, Thomas R. Nides, testified in her place before two Congressional committees, and said that many of the report's recommendations would be in place before year-end. Clinton planned to testify herself in January.

The Benghazi matter also had an effect on Clinton's successor as Secretary of State. Obama's first choice was Ambassador to the UN Susan Rice, but she came under heavy criticism from Congressional Republicans for what they felt were incorrect or deceptive statements in the aftermath of the attack, and by mid-December she withdrew her name from consideration. Obama then nominated Senator John Kerry for the position instead. By one report, Clinton had preferred Kerry over Rice all along anyway. Although still not well enough to attend the December 21 announcement of Kerry's nomination, Clinton was described by Obama as being "in good spirits" and, in a statement, praised Kerry as being of the "highest caliber".

Clinton was scheduled to return to work the week of December 31, but then on December 30 was admitted to New York-Presbyterian Hospital for treatment and observation after a blood clot related to the concussion was discovered. On December 31 it was announced that the clot was behind her ear near her brain, specifically a right transverse sinus venous thrombosis, that she was being treated with anticoagulants, that she had not suffered any neurological damage, and that she was expected to make a full recovery.

== Final days of tenure ==
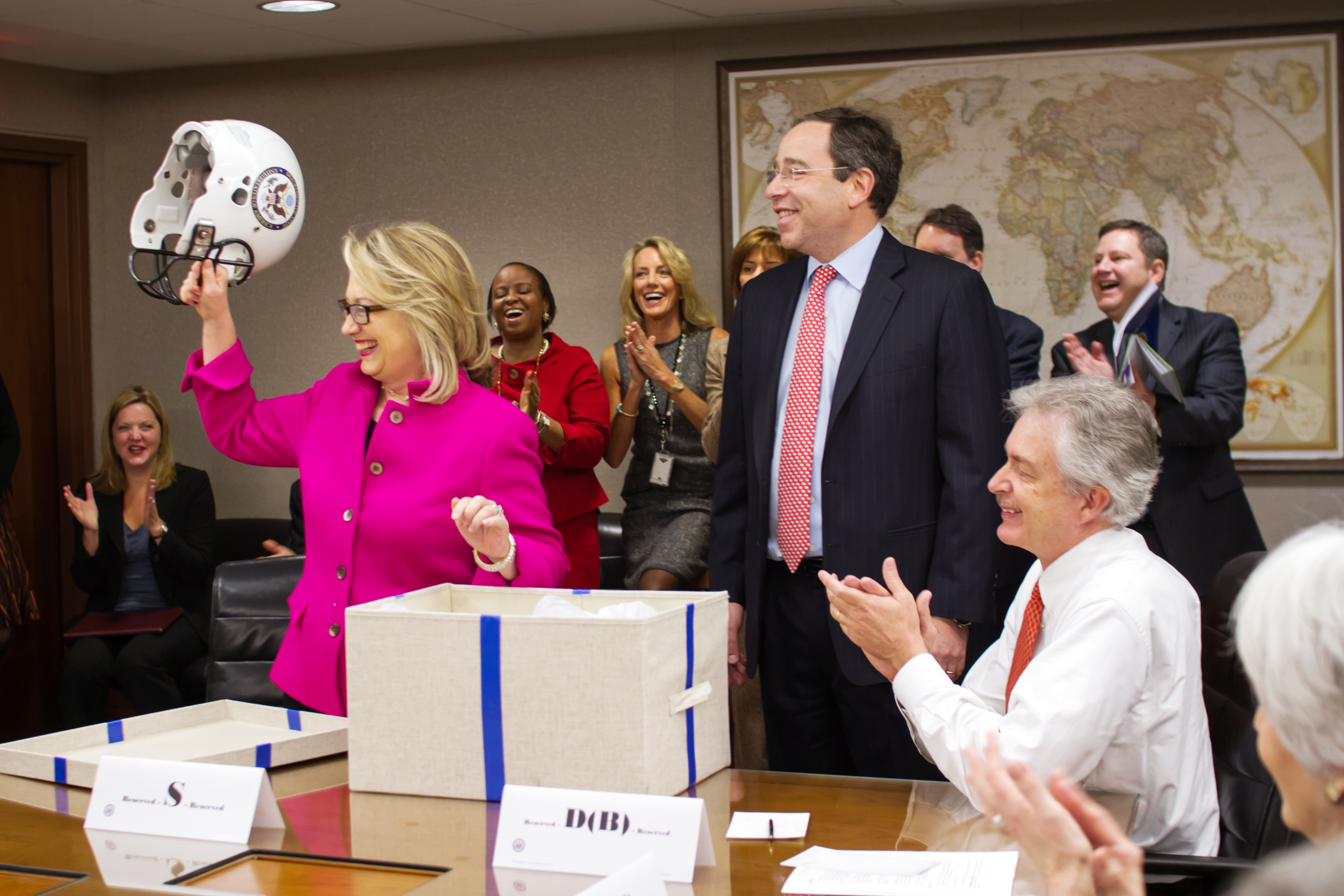
Secretary Clinton is welcomed back to work at the State Department on January 7, 2013

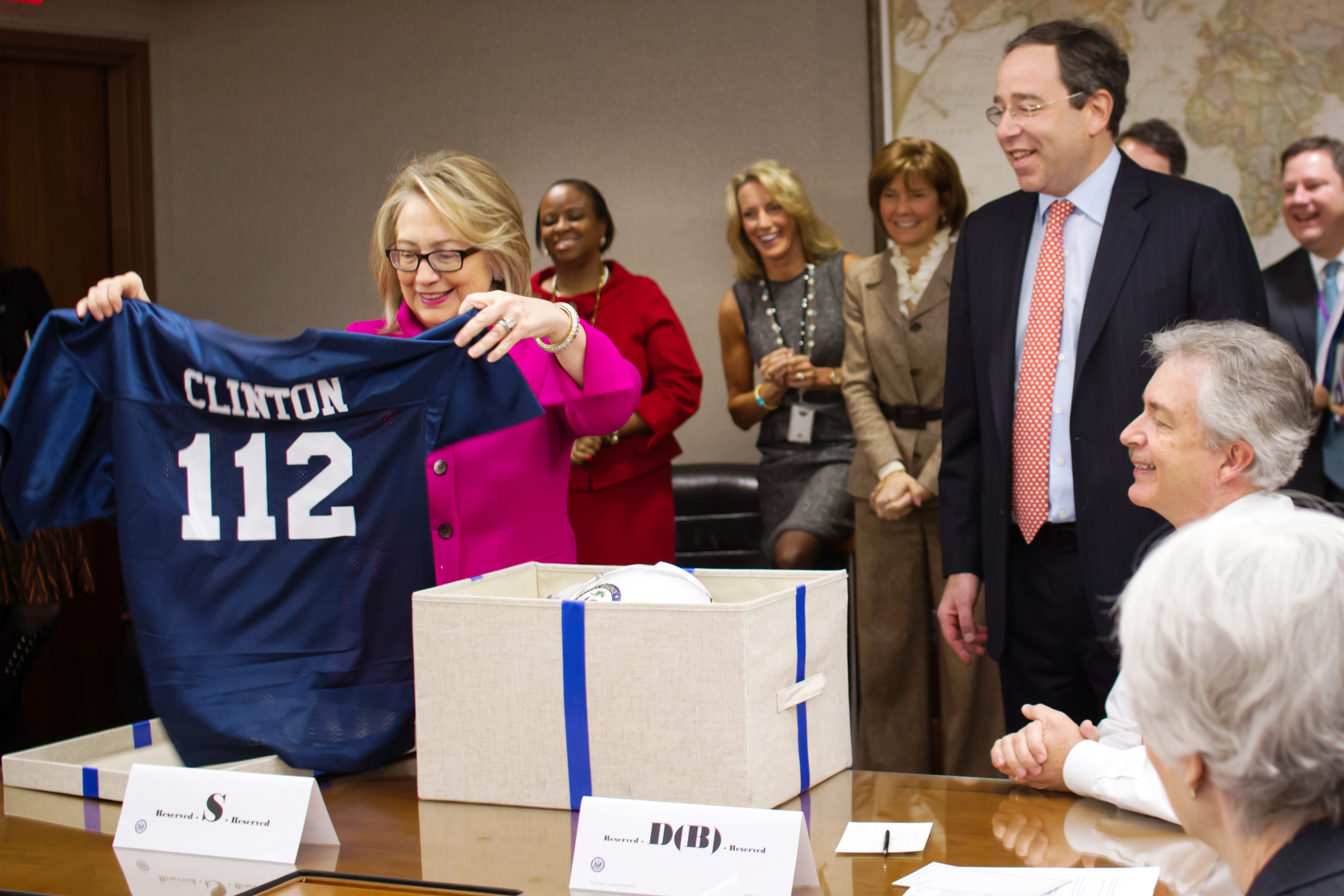
Secretary Clinton receives a football jersey with 112, the number of countries she visited during her tenure

Clinton returned to work at the State Department on January 7. The illness put an end to her days of travel in the job. She finished with 112 countries visited, more than any other secretary of state. Her total of 956,733 air miles was less than Condoleezza Rice's record for total mileage. Clinton traveled during 401 days, with 306 of those spent in actual diplomatic meetings, and spent the equivalent of 87 full days on airplanes. Compared to other recent secretaries, Clinton traveled more broadly, with fewer repeat visits to certain countries.

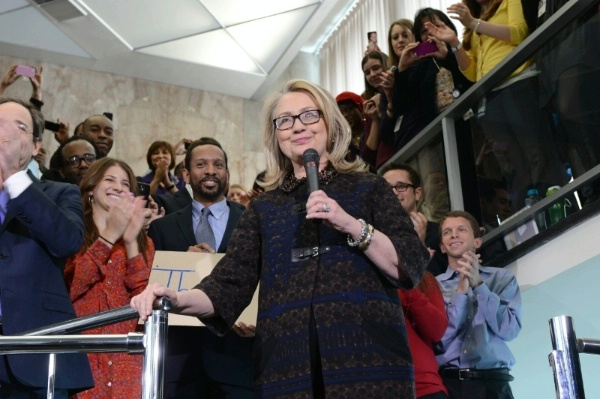
Secretary Clinton gives her farewell remarks to State Department employees on her last day in office, February 1, 2013

On January 23, Clinton finally gave more than five hours of testimony on the Benghazi matter before hearings of the Senate Foreign Relations Committee and the House Foreign Affairs Committee. She said with a choking voice, "For me, this is not just a matter of policy, it's personal. I stood next to President Obama as the Marines carried those flag-draped caskets off the plane at Andrews. I put my arms around the mothers and fathers, sisters and brothers, sons and daughters." She again accepted formal responsibility for the departmental security lapses that led to the attack and deaths, but in explanation did not accept personal blame for them. She said, "I feel responsible for the nearly 70,000 people who work for the State Department. But the specific security requests pertaining to Benghazi, you know, were handled by the security professionals in the department. I didn't see those requests. They didn't come to me. I didn't approve them. I didn't deny them." She did acknowledge that she had supported keeping the Benghazi consulate open after an earlier debate about its deteriorating security, but said she had assumed the security personnel involved would address any issues with it.

Senator Ron Johnson, a Republican associated with the Tea Party movement, questioned her repeatedly on a different aspect, whether Ambassador to the UN Rice had misled the public after the attacks. This line drew the fieriest response from Clinton, who with voice raised and fists shaking, responded, "With all due respect, the fact is we had four dead Americans. Was it because of a protest or was it because of guys out for a walk one night decided they'd go kill some Americans? What difference, at this point, does it make? It is our job to figure out what happened and do everything we can to prevent it from ever happening again, senator." Other Republicans also attacked Clinton, with Representative Jeff Duncan accusing her of "national security malpractice" and Senator Rand Paul saying that the president should have dismissed her from her job for having failed to read security-related cables coming into the State Department (she had said there are over a million cables that come into the department and they are all formally addressed to her). Senator John McCain said that while "It's wonderful to see you in good health and as combative as ever", he was unsatisfied with her answers.

Clinton also took the opportunity to address the ongoing conflict in Mali and the rest of Northern Africa, saying "this Pandora's Box if you will" of side effects from the Arab Spring had opened a new security challenge for the U.S. Specifically, she said "we cannot permit northern Mali to become a safe haven."

The next day, January 24, Clinton introduced John Kerry before the Senate Foreign Relations Committee, as hearings were held on his nomination to succeed her. She called him "the right choice to carry forward the Obama Administration's foreign policy", and called out his testimony before the same committee in 1971 in opposition to the Vietnam War as "speaking hard truths about a war that had gone badly off track."

On January 27, 60 Minutes aired a joint interview with Obama and Clinton. The interview was Obama's idea and was the first he had done with a member of his administration. In it, Obama consistently praised Clinton's performance in the position, saying "I think Hillary will go down as one of the finest secretary of states we've had." Both said the relationship between them had been very comfortable, and that getting past their 2008 primary campaign battles had not been difficult for them personally. Regarding her health, Clinton said, "I still have some lingering effects from falling on my head and having the blood clot. But the doctors tell me that will all recede. And so, thankfully, I'm looking forward to being at full speed."

On January 29, Clinton held a global and final town hall meeting, the 59th of her tenure. Also on January 29, the Senate Foreign Relations Committee approved Kerry's nomination unanimously and the full Senate confirmed the nomination by a 94–3 vote. In her final public speech, on January 31 before the Council on Foreign Relations, Clinton returned to the themes of "smart power". She suggested that a new architecture was needed for relations within the world, giving an analogy of Frank Gehry compared to ancient Greek architecture: "Some of his work at first might appear haphazard, but in fact, it's highly intentional and sophisticated. Where once a few strong columns could hold up the weight of the world, today we need a dynamic mix of materials and structures." She added, echoing Madeleine Albright, "... we are truly the indispensable nation, it's not meant as a boast or an empty slogan. It's a recognition of our role and our responsibilities. That's why all the declinists are dead wrong. It's why the United States must and will continue to lead in this century even as we lead in new ways."

Clinton's final day as secretary was February 1, 2013, when she met with Obama to hand in her letter of resignation and later gave farewell remarks in a meeting with employees at State Department headquarters.

== Overall themes and legacy ==
Although Clinton's tenure as Secretary of State was popular at the time among the public and praised by President Obama, observers have noted that there was no signature diplomatic breakthrough during it nor any transformative domination of major issues in the nature of Dean Acheson, George Marshall, or Henry Kissinger. The intractable issues when she entered office, such as Iran, Pakistan, Arab-Israeli relations, and North Korea, were still that way when she left. Many of Clinton's initiatives in the "smart power" realm will take much more time to evaluate as to their effect. Aaron David Miller, a vice president at the Woodrow Wilson International Center for Scholars, said that "She's coming away with a stellar reputation that seems to have put her almost above criticism. But you can't say that she's really led on any of the big issues for this administration or made a major mark on high strategy." Michael E. O'Hanlon, a Brookings Institution analyst, said that, "Even an admirer, such as myself, must acknowledge that few big problems were solved on her watch, few victories achieved. [She has been] more solid than spectacular." Others have been more highly critical of her tenure as secretary; in a 2015 book entitled Exceptional: Why the World Needs a Powerful America, former vice president Dick Cheney and his daughter, Liz Cheney argue that Clinton's tenure, and the Obama administration's foreign policy generally, weakened U.S. standing in its international relations and deviated sharply from 70 years of well-established, bipartisan U.S. foreign and defense policy that the United States had generally adhered to since World War II. Others, however, such as Eric Schmidt disagree, and have argued that Clinton was "perhaps the most significant secretary of state since" Acheson. All agreed on her celebrity; as one unnamed official said, "She's the first secretary who's also been a global rock star. It's allowed her to raise issues on the global agenda in a way that no one before her has been able to do."

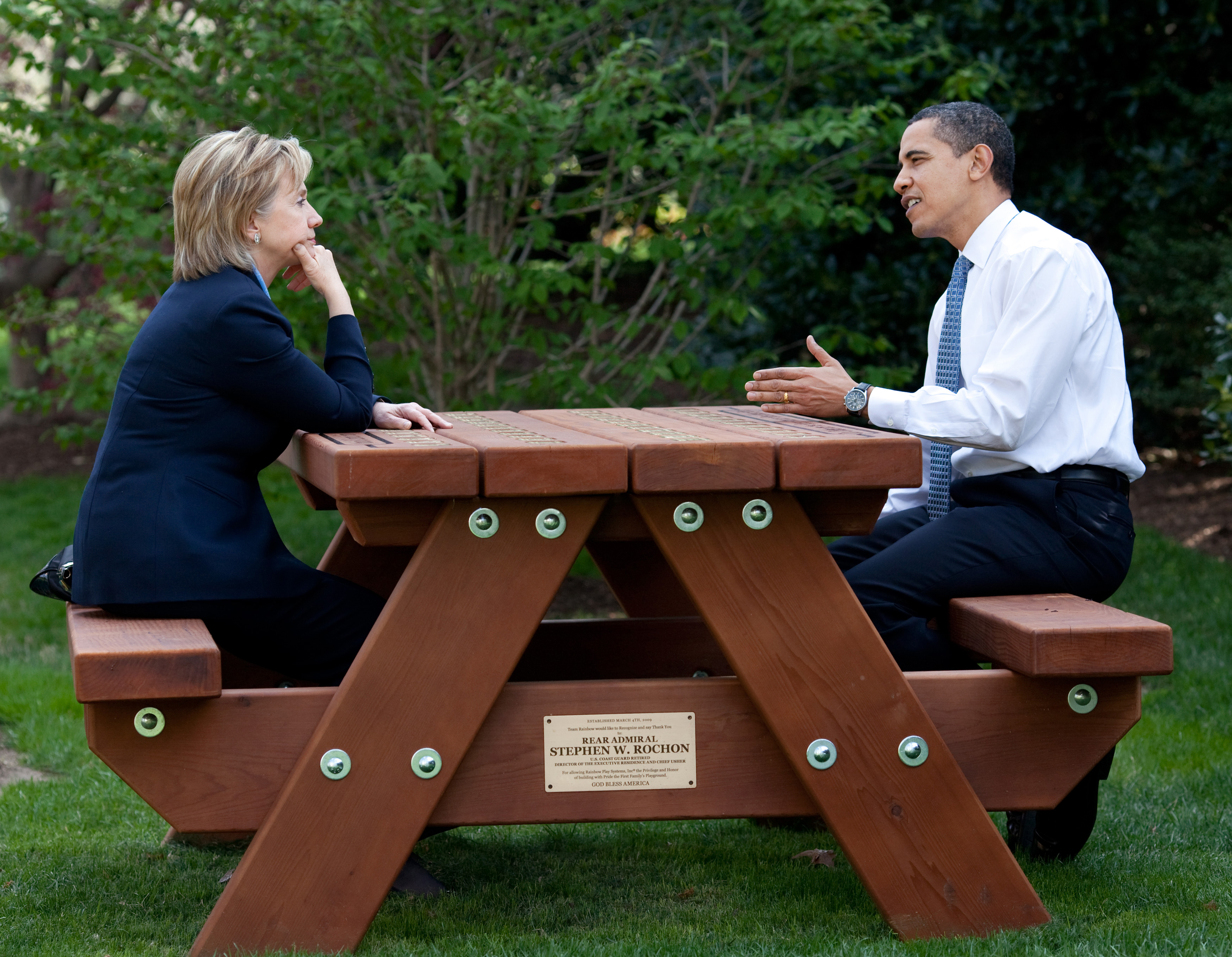
Secretary of State Clinton and President Obama discuss matters in 2009, at a picnic table on the grounds of the White House

The divisions between Obama and Clinton that many observers had originally predicted, never happened. Indeed, a writer for The New York Times Magazine declared that "Obama and Clinton have instead led the least discordant national-security team in decades, despite enormous challenges on almost every front." In part, this was because Obama and Clinton both approached foreign policy as a largely non-ideological, pragmatic exercise. Nevertheless, there were limitations to her influence: Much of the handling of the Middle East, Iraq, and Iran was done by the White House or Pentagon during her tenure, and on some other issues as well, policy-making was kept inside the White House among Obama's inner circle of advisors. There were also differences of opinion. Clinton failed to persuade Obama to arm and train Syrian rebels in 2012, but overcame initial opposition to gain approval of her visit to Burma in 2011. Clinton's initial idea of having special envoys under her handling key trouble spots fell apart due to various circumstances. Clinton did find bureaucratic success in edging out the U.S. Commerce Department, by having the State Department take a lead role in sales pitches in favor of U.S. companies. In doing so, she helped negotiate international deals for the likes of Boeing, Lockheed Martin, and Westinghouse Electric Company. Clinton believed, more than most prior secretaries, that the commercial aspects of diplomacy and the promotion of international trade were vital to American foreign policy goals.

Obama later referred to the Libya intervention when questioned about his worst mistake. Obama asserted that he had been reluctant to intervene but that intervention had been championed by Clinton and Susan Rice. Obama cited the lack of preparation the Administration had made for a post-Gaddafi Libya, lack of followup by European countries and greater-than-expected intertribal divisions in Libya. However, Clinton's stance is that the intervention was beneficial because it avoided another Syria-like scenario.

Clinton's background as an elected politician showed in her touch for dealing with people, in remembering personal connections, in visiting State Department staff when overseas, and in sympathizing with the dilemmas of elected foreign leaders. It sometimes served to her detriment though, such as in Egypt when her personal relationship with the Mubaraks may have caused her to initially back them too long during the Egyptian Revolution. At least until the Benghazi matter, she retained personal support among a number of Republicans; in mid-2012, Republican Senator Lindsey Graham said, "I think she's represented our nation well. She is extremely well respected throughout the world, handles herself in a very classy way and has a work ethic second to none."

Especially in the Mideast turmoil but elsewhere as well, Clinton saw an opportunity to advance one of the central themes of her tenure, the empowerment and welfare of women and girls worldwide. Moreover, she viewed women's rights and human rights as critical for U.S. security interests, as part of what has become known as the "Hillary Doctrine". Former State Department director and coordinator Theresa Loar said in 2011 that, "I honestly think Hillary Clinton wakes up every day thinking about how to improve the lives of women and girls. And I don't know another world leader who is doing that." In turn, there was a trend of women around the world finding more opportunities, and in some cases feeling safer, as the result of her actions and visibility.

A mid-2012 Pew Research study of public opinions found that Clinton was viewed positively in Japan and most European countries in terms of people having confidence that she would do the right thing in world affairs. She received mixed marks in China, Russia, and some Central and South American countries, and low marks in Muslim countries, on this question. Overall, Clinton's attempts to improve the image of America in Muslim countries did not find any immediate success due to many factors, including the unpopularity of drone strikes in Pakistan and elsewhere. Perceptions of the U.S. in those countries declined during her tenure according to a Pew Research, which found that only 15 percent of Muslims had a favorable impression of the U.S. in 2012, compared to 25 percent in 2009. Specifically in Pakistan, only 12 percent of Pakistanis had a favorable impression of the U.S. in 2012, compared to 16 percent in 2009, and only 3 percent had confidence in Clinton compared to 37 percent not.

The first secretary of state to visit countries such as Togo and Timor-Leste, Clinton believed that in-person visits were more important than ever in the digital age. As she said in remarks shortly before leaving office, "I have found it highly ironic that, in today's world, when we can be anywhere virtually, more than ever people want us to show up, actually. Somebody said to me the other day, 'I look at your travel schedule. Why Togo? Why the Cook Islands?' No secretary of state had ever been to Togo before. Togo happens to be on the U.N. Security Council. Going there, making the personal investment, has a real strategic purpose."

== Post-tenure issues ==
=== Financial accounting, document requests, Clinton Foundation ===
According to the Office of the Inspector General report made in 2014, the State Department's records failed to properly account for some $6 billion in contracts over the prior six years, including around $2 billion for the department's mission in Iraq. The report said, "The failure to maintain contract files adequately creates significant financial risk and demonstrates a lack of internal control over the Department's contract actions," and added that investigators and auditors had found "repeated examples of poor contract file administration" which it had characterized as having been one of the department's "major management challenges" for several years.

During 2014, the State Department failed to turn over documents to the Associated Press that it had asked for through a Freedom of Information Act request based on the possibility of Clinton running for president in 2016. The department said it "does its best to meet its FOIA responsibilities" but that it was under a heavy administrative load for such requests.

The ethics agreement between the State Department and Bill Clinton and the Clinton Foundation that was put into force at the beginning of the secretary's tenure came under scrutiny from the news media during early 2015. A Wall Street Journal report found that the Clinton Foundation had resumed accepting donations from foreign governments once Secretary Clinton's tenure had ended. A Washington Post inquiry into donations by foreign governments to the Clinton Foundation during the secretary's tenure found a six cases where such governments continued making donations at the same level they had before Clinton became secretary, which was permissible under the agreement, and also one instance of a new donation, $500,000 from Algeria in January 2010 for earthquake relief in Haiti, that was outside the bounds of the continuation provision and should have received a special ethics review but did not. The Post noted that the donation "coincided with a spike" in lobbying efforts by Algeria of the State Department regarding their human rights record but that during 2010 and 2011 the department still issued human rights reports critical of Algeria's restrictions on freedom of assembly, women's rights and labor rights that also pointed to instances of extrajudicial killings, corruption, and lack of transparency in the government. A Politico analysis of State Department documents found that the department approved virtually all of Bill Clinton's proposed speaking engagements, even when they lacked sufficient information about the valuation of those talks or links between them and possible subsequent donations to the Clinton Foundation.

From 2009 to 2013, the Russian atomic energy agency Rosatom acquired Uranium One, a Canadian company with global uranium mining stakes including 20 percent of the uranium production capacity in the United States. The strategically sensitive acquisition required the approval of the Canadian government as well as a number of U.S. governmental bodies including the State Department. In April 2015, The New York Times reported that, during the acquisition, the family foundation of Uranium One's chairman made $2.35 million in donations to the Clinton Foundation. Also during this time, Bill Clinton received a $500,000 payment from Renaissance Capital, a Russian investment bank whose analysts were praising Uranium One stock, for making speech in Moscow. The Foundation donations were not publicly disclosed by the Clinton Foundation or the State Department, despite a prior agreement to do so, in part due to taking advantage of the donations going through a Canadian affiliate of the Foundation. A FactCheck.org analysis stated that while the reports raised "legitimate questions about the Clinton Foundation and its donations," the reports "presented no evidence that the donations influenced Clinton's official actions." Asked about the issue in June 2015, the former secretary said of the State Department's role in the approval, "There were nine government agencies that that had to sign off on that deal. I was not personally involved because that's not something [the] Secretary of State did."

=== Use of private email server ===
In early March 2015, a New York Times report revealed that throughout her time as Secretary of State, Clinton used her own private email server, rather than government-issued departmental ones Further investigation revealed that the day of her first Senate hearing to become Secretary of State, Clinton, or an associate, purchased a private email server under the pseudonym "Eric Hoteham". The server was set up in her home in Chappaqua, New York. The matter gained widespread public attention due to concerns about the security of the mails she sent and received and whether they were exposed to hacking and surveillance; the availability and preservation of the mails for Freedom of Information Act requests and the archival historical record; and whether her action had violated any federal laws, regulations, or guidelines. Also in question was whether the use of the private email server violated State Department transparency protocols.

In response to the attention, Clinton said she had in December 2014 turned over 55,000 pages of e-mails to the State Department following their request and that she now wanted them made public. These 55,000 printed pages accounted for 30,490, or slightly less than half, of the 62,320 emails that Clinton had sent or received on her private email account during her time as secretary. At a press conference Clinton said she had set up the separate server as a matter of convenience so that she could carry one device and not two, but that in retrospect "it would have been better if I'd simply used a second email account and carried a second phone". She said that she had sent mails to State Department employees on their government accounts, ensuring such mails would be preserved, but it then turned out that the department did not automatically or routinely save such mails. After the revelations, questions were raised about whether Clinton, when she resigned in February 2013, had signed Form OF-109, a standard document declaring that she had turned over all work-related records. After searching, the State Department said it had "no record" that Clinton had signed the form, were "fairly certain" that she had not, and that it appeared neither of her two immediate predecessors as secretary had either. According to the text of the form, it warns individuals signing it that falsification is subject to criminal penalties under Section 1001 of Title 18.

A portion of the emails on Clinton's private server were emails sent in 2011 and 2012 by Sidney Blumenthal, a political supporter and campaign staffer who worked for the Clinton Foundation. Blumenthal prepared, from public and other sources, about 25 memos which he sent to Clinton during 2011 and 2012 which she shared through her aide, Jake Sullivan, with senior State Department personnel. In the form of intelligence briefings, the memos sometimes touted his business associates and, at times contained inaccurate information.

In August 2015, it was reported that Clinton had personally paid a State Department staffer, Bryan Pagliano, who had previously served as IT director for Clinton's 2008 presidential campaign, to maintain her private server while she was Secretary of State. According to a Clinton campaign official, this ensured that taxpayer dollars would not be spent on a private server that was shared by Clinton, her husband and their daughter, as well as several aides to the former president. On September 1, 2015, Pagliano's attorney sent letters to the House Select Committee on Benghazi, which had subpoenaed Pagliano, and to the Senate Judiciary Committee, which was inquiring about Pagliano's outside employment while a Federal employee, informing the committees that his client would invoke his constitutional Fifth Amendment rights not to answer any questions from the committees, and on September 10, in a closed-door session before the Benghazi Committee, Pagliano personally appeared to invoke his Fifth Amendment right not to testify before the committee.

=== Mishandling of classified information ===
On July 23, 2015, The New York Times reported the existence of a June 2015, memorandum to the Justice Department from the Inspectors General of the Intelligence Community and the State Department regarding the presence of classified government information in emails from the personal email account Hillary Clinton used as Secretary of State. A transmittal memorandum, written by State Department official Patrick F. Kennedy, said that, based on an assessment of a small sample of the contents of Clinton's private account by the two Inspectors General, it was likely that the entire body of emails contained hundreds of instances of classified information. In their joint statement, the inspectors general said that classified information in the emails had originated from U.S. intelligence agencies, such as the CIA and the NSA, and that it is illegal anyone to receive a classified document, or briefing, and then summarize or otherwise transmit that information in an unclassified email.

Clinton and her campaign reiterated that the information transmitted was not classified "at the time", but the inspectors general, as well as reporting by The New York Times and others, said that it, in fact, was classified at the time. Information is considered classified if its disclosure would likely harm national security, and government procedures and protocols require that such information be sent or stored only on government computer networks with government safeguards.

An FBI probe was initiated regarding how classified information was handled on the Clinton server. During the summer and fall of 2016 the probe was twice concluded with a recommendation of no charges, a recommendation that was followed by the Justice Department, but according to Clinton herself, the emails matter and the way in which it would not go away contributed to her electoral defeat. Former FBI agent Peter Strzok, fired for bias against Trump, changed the language from "grossly negligent" to "extremely careless," changing a key word that could have had legal ramifications for Clinton. An individual who mishandles classified material can be prosecuted under federal law for "gross negligence."

The Department of State finished its internal investigation of the matter in September 2019, citing 588 security violations. The review found that 38 current and former State Department officials – some of whom might face a disciplinary action or security clearance review – were culpable of mishandling classified information, but in 497 cases the culpability could not be established. The material was considered classified then or later, but none of the violations involved information marked classified. The investigation found Clinton's use of personal email server increased the risk of compromising State Department information, but "there was no persuasive evidence of systemic, deliberate mishandling of classified information." The investigation added that although there was no evidence that Clinton's private server had been compromised, "the use of a private email system to conduct official business added an increased degree of risk of compromise as a private system lacks the network monitoring and intrusion detection capabilities of State Department networks."

=== Secret Service leaks through United States embassy in Moscow ===
In a Guardian article in August 2018, a female Russian national at the United States embassy in Moscow, who worked for the United States Secret Service and had access to both classified and sensitive information for a decade, had met often with Russian intelligence officials. The Secret Service intranet data bases contained information which would have been useful for Russian hackers during their subsequent attacks on Clinton while she campaigned for president in 2016. Although she became under suspicion in 2016, the United States Department of State's Regional Security Office investigation began in January 2017 and led to actions which both revoked her security clearance and had her removed from the embassy staff during the summer of 2017 when 750 of the 1,200 persons in the staff were removed following the July 2017 United States sanctions against Russia due to Russia's interference in the United States 2016 elections. The FBI and CIA also had begun inquiries. A Secret Service investigation, however, denied that any information had been passed to FSB from the Russian national.

== See also ==
- Hillary Clinton's tenure as First Lady of the United States
- US Senate career of Hillary Clinton
- Hillary Clinton's tenures as First Lady of Arkansas
- Legal career of Hillary Clinton
- Activities of Hillary Clinton subsequent to 2016
- Post-presidency of Bill Clinton

== Bibliography ==
- Green, Michael J. By more than providence: Grand strategy and American power in the Asia Pacific since 1783 (Columbia UP, 2017), pp. 518–540. online
- Heilemann, John; Halperin, Mark (2010). Game Change: Obama and the Clintons, McCain and Palin, and the Race of a Lifetime. New York: HarperCollins. ISBN 978-0-06-173363-5.
- Hudson, Valerie M.; Leidl, Patricia (2015). The Hillary Doctrine: Sex & American Foreign Policy. New York: Columbia University Press. ISBN 978-0-231-16492-4.
- Kornblut, Anne E. (2009). Notes from the Cracked Ceiling: Hillary Clinton, Sarah Palin, and What It Will Take for a Woman to Win. New York: Crown Books. ISBN 978-0-307-46425-5.
- Libert, Barry; Faulk, Rick (2009). Barack, Inc.: Winning Business Lessons of the Obama Campaign. Upper Saddle River, New Jersey: FT Press. ISBN 978-0-13-702207-6.
- Wolffe, Richard (2009). Renegade: The Making of a President. New York: Crown Publishers. ISBN 978-0-307-46312-8.
