= Hillary Doctrine =

The "Hillary Doctrine" is the doctrine of former United States Secretary of State Hillary Rodham Clinton, particularly in reference to her stance that women's rights and violence against women should be considered issues of national security. The doctrine encompasses stances she has held before, during, and after her tenure as secretary.

== The doctrine ==
The doctrine is most explicitly stated in a December 8, 2010, surprise appearance talk that Clinton made at the TEDWoman Conference in Washington, D.C.:

So the United States has made empowering women and girls a cornerstone of our foreign policy, because women's equality is not just a moral issue, it's not just a humanitarian issue, it is not just a fairness issue; it is a security issue. It is a prosperity issue and it is a peace issue ... Give women equal rights, and entire nations are more stable and secure. Deny women equal rights, and the instability of nations is almost certain. The subjugation of women is, therefore, a threat to the common security of our world and to the national security of our country.

The principle was incorporated into the inaugural Quadrennial Diplomacy and Development Review that was conducted and published by the State Department during 2009–10, which mentioned women and girls over 130 times and which said "The protection and empowerment of women and girls is key to the foreign policy and security of the United States."

The doctrine was stated again by Clinton in the culminating chapter of Hard Choices, her 2014 memoir of her time as secretary:

... It was no coincidence that the places where women's lives were most undervalued largely lined up with the parts of the world most plagued by instability, conflict, extremism, and poverty. This was a point lost on many of the men working across Washington's foreign policy establishment, but over the years I came to view it as one of the most compelling arguments for why standing up for women and girls was not just the right thing to do but also smart and strategic ... the correlation was undeniable, and a growing body of research showed that improving conditions for women helped resolve conflicts and stabilize societies. "Women's issues" had long been relegated to the margins of U.S. foreign policy and international diplomacy, considered at best a nice thing to work on but hardly a necessity. I became convinced that, in fact, this was a cause that cut to the heart of our national security.

== History and analysis ==
The roots of the doctrine begin with the lineage of Clinton's political career from standing in the shadow of her husband, President Bill Clinton, as First Lady, to being put in the public spotlight in her own right during a speech she gave at the Fourth World Conference on Women in 1995 in Beijing. In this speech, Clinton made the proclamation that, "if there is one message that echoes forth from this conference, let it be that human rights are women's rights and women's rights are human rights once and for all." This statement was a pivotal moment and starting point in the formation of what subsequently became known as the Hillary Doctrine.

Another important early marker was the adoption of United Nations Security Council Resolution 1325 and the National Action Plans that came out of it. And during her U.S. Senate confirmation hearings to become Secretary of State, Clinton stated: "I want to pledge to you that as secretary of state I view [women's] issues as central to our foreign policy, not as adjunct or auxiliary or in any way lesser than all of the other issues that we have to confront."

The explicit notion of such a thing was first introduced by a Newsweek article entitled "The Hillary Doctrine" and published in March 2011 by journalist Gayle Tzemach Lemmon. In it, Clinton is quoted as saying that she believes "that the rights of women and girls is the unfinished business of the 21st century." To strengthen her argument for women's rights, Clinton situates this issue within the context of national security, in that, "where women are disempowered and dehumanized, you are more likely to see not just antidemocratic forces, but extremism that leads to security challenges."

In another article by Lemmon, published in The Atlantic in April 2013, the Hillary Doctrine is again elucidated. Lemmon cites a speech given by Clinton to the Women in the World Summit soon after leaving the State Department in which she reflects upon the case she made for women's rights in the past and argues that "too many otherwise thoughtful people continue to see the fortunes of women and girls as somehow separate from society at large." Further, Clinton explains how extremists rely upon this ignorance to keep women from being liberated, and, with that, also bar entire societies from liberation. However, rather than speaking in purely abstract terms of "extremists" and "societies", Clinton concretely identifies some countries that she wants to see treat their women better, namely: Egypt, Pakistan, India, and at a different level, the United States itself. To conclude, Lemmon speculates whether the Hillary Doctrine will be transformed into a political platform upon which Clinton can run for President in 2015. However, regardless of speculation on Clinton's actions in the future, for now, the Hillary Doctrine stands as an important contribution to national security discussions around the world.

In their 2015 book The Hillary Doctrine: Sex and American Foreign Policy, Texas A&M University professor Valerie M. Hudson and former World Health Organization manager and consultant Patricia Leidl examine the Hillary Doctrine at length, beginning with its premise. At first, the notion was considered counter-intuitive and sometimes received cursory dismissal within academic circles. But Hudson surveys research that she and others have done, in part using the WomanStats Project database, on the link between violence against women and gender inequality within a state and the level of national security and stability of that state. They summarize one set of findings by saying: "What the research team found was that the best predictor of a state's peacefulness was not level of democracy, or wealth, or civilizational identity: The best predictor of a state's peacefulness was its level of violence against women. These findings cut across wealth, regime type, and region." Several case studies are described that investigate causation, such as looking sex-selective abortion and female infanticide in Asia, rape during the Congo civil wars, the fate of women in the Arab Spring, and at greatest length, ongoing violence against women in Guatemala.

Hudson and Leidl then look at the foreign policy of the Barack Obama administration and Hillary Clinton's tenure as Secretary of State to see whether their actions reflected commitment to the Hillary Doctrine. In many cases, they found that it did, such as appointing many women to positions of power, increasing funding for the Office of Global Women's Issues by a factor of ten, heavy use of social media, and Clinton's local visits to women's groups. Indeed, Clinton made the empowerment of women worldwide the signature issue of her time as Secretary of State. But they also note a number of occasions where Clinton and the administration were silent about abuses of women or girls due to strategic needs of the U.S., most of all in the "conspicuous silence" about Saudi Arabia's treatment of its female population. Finally, they look at implementation, and find that during the period in question much was done to implement the Hillary Doctrine in Washington by means of setting up a regulatory and legal framework for it, but that there was a more mixed record past that point, with omissions and weaknesses occurring in the program development, contracting, and local implementation phases.

Critiques of the doctrine have suggested that it embodies "imperial feminism", the promotion of feminist values in order to justify militarism and a modern-day U.S. empire. Another line of concern is that U.S. actions put women at risk over time, with particular attention to those who were encouraged to take a more prominent role in pushing for women's rights in Afghanistan and anxiety for their safety following the planned withdrawal of U.S. forces from that country. Indeed, Hudson and Leidl consider the condition of Afghan women to be a litmus test for whether the Hillary Doctrine can achieve realization. Other theories to explain the root causes of conflict and international instability also exist, such as the Clash of Civilizations hypothesis, democratic peace theory, and an emphasis on environmental poverty and scarcity.

== Other formulations ==
Several other definitions of what a "Hillary Doctrine" might be have appeared in print. Another article titled "The Hillary Doctrine", published in The Atlantic in January 2013 by journalist David Rohde, talks about the terms of exchanges between Clinton and other American politicians within discussions of dilemmas concerning the United States and certain African countries. This time, Clinton explicitly called out actions taken by the United States abroad, and argued that, contrary to popular belief, "a lot of the challenges we face are not immediately – or sustainably – solved by military action alone." Further, while the aforementioned doctrine focuses on populations, such as women and children, that are typically ignored within discussions of national security, Clinton also makes an effort to push for including places that have historically been ignored within national security discussions, as well. However, Rohde never mentions the phrase "Hillary Doctrine" in the piece, and it could have been the creation of the magazine's headline writer.

In April 2015, James M. Goldgeier, political scientist and dean of the School of International Service at American University, wrote an article titled "The Hillary Clinton Doctrine" (the only place in the article that mentions "doctrine") for The National Interest. However, the article mostly analyzes foreign policy trends of the last several U.S. administrations and makes suggestions for what a Hillary Clinton foreign policy should be while emphasizing the limitations and difficulties of possible courses of action.

No explicit mention of a "Hillary Doctrine" by name has been made by Clinton herself. Moreover, in Hard Choices, she stated that there was no unified "Obama Doctrine" during her tenure either, saying the range of problems the country faced did not allow for a "simple and elegant road map" to deal with them. However, in an August 2014 interview with journalist Jeffrey Goldberg of The Atlantic, Clinton seems to yearn for such an approach in dealing with jihadism that was comparable to the containment strategy the U.S. used against the Soviet Union during the Cold War. She made reference to a much-quoted simple dictum of Obama's by saying, "Great nations need organizing principles, and 'Don't do stupid stuff' is not an organizing principle." Analyzing this interview, in August 2014, journalist John Cassidy wrote an article called "The Hillary Doctrine: 'Smart Power' or 'Back to the Crusades'?" in The New Yorker that stated that Clinton was advocating "a sustained global campaign targeting radical Islam (some, doubtless, will call it a 'crusade') that encompasses all of the options at the disposal of the United States and its allies: military, diplomatic, economic, political, and rhetorical." But again, the phrase "Hillary Doctrine" is only in the piece's headline.

== Bibliography ==
- Clinton, Hillary Rodham (2014). Hard Choices. New York: Simon & Schuster. ISBN 978-1-4767-5144-3.
- Hudson, Valerie M.; Leidl, Patricia (2015). The Hillary Doctrine: Sex & American Foreign Policy. New York: Columbia University Press. ISBN 978-0-231-16492-4.
