= Bibliography of Hillary Clinton =

This is a list of books and scholarly articles by and about Hillary Clinton, as well as columns by her.

Books are broken out by point of view. Columns about Clinton are not included, as they would be too numerous to list. Self-published works are not included.

== Books ==
=== By Clinton ===
- Clinton, Hillary Rodham (1996). It Takes a Village: And Other Lessons Children Teach Us. Simon & Schuster. ISBN 978-1-4165-4064-9.
  - Tenth anniversary edition with new Introduction. Simon & Schuster, 2006. ISBN 1-4165-4064-4.
  - Picture book, with illustrations by Marla Frazee. Simon & Schuster, 2017. ISBN 1-4814-3087-4.
- Clinton, Hillary Rodham (1998). Dear Socks, Dear Buddy: Kids' Letters to the First Pets. Simon & Schuster. ISBN 0-684-85778-2.
- Clinton, Hillary Rodham (2000). An Invitation to the White House: At Home with History. Simon & Schuster. ISBN 978-0684857992.
- Clinton, Hillary Rodham (2003). Living History. Simon & Schuster. ISBN 978-0743222242.
- Clinton, Hillary Rodham (2014). Hard Choices. Simon & Schuster. ISBN 978-1476751443.
- Clinton, Hillary; Kaine, Tim (2016). Stronger Together. Simon & Schuster. ISBN 978-1501161735.
- Clinton, Hillary Rodham (2017). What Happened. Simon & Schuster. ISBN 978-1501175565.
- Clinton, Hillary Rodham; Clinton, Chelsea (2019). The Book of Gutsy Women: Favorite Stories of Courage and Resilience. Simon & Schuster. ISBN 978-1501178412.
- Clinton, Hillary; Clinton, Chelsea (2020). Grandma's Gardens (Children's). Illustrated by Carme Lemniscates. Philomel Books. ISBN 978-0593115350.
- Clinton, Hillary Rodham; Penny, Louise (2021). State of Terror. Simon & Schuster, St. Martin's Press. ISBN 9781982173678.
- Clinton, Hillary Rodham (2024). Something Lost, Something Gained: Reflections on Life, Love, and Liberty. Simon & Schuster. ISBN 9781668017234.

=== About Clinton ===
- Blumenthal, Sidney. The Clinton Wars. Farrar, Straus and Giroux, 2003. ISBN 0-374-12502-3.
- Bordo, Susan. The Destruction of Hillary Clinton: Untangling the Political Forces, Media Culture, and Assault on Fact That Decided the 2016 Election. Melville House, 2017. ISBN 978-1612196626
- Brock, David. Killing the Messenger: The Right-Wing Plot to Derail Hillary and Hijack Your Government. Twelve, 2015. ISBN 1-4555-3376-9.
- Casey, Wilson. 101 Reasons to Vote FOR Hillary. Skyhorse Publishing, 2016. ISBN 978-1634505789.
- Church, Trevor. Out of the Woods: The Lynch Mob & Hillary Clinton. HERstory House, 2017. ISBN 978-1977718723.
- Clinton, Bill. My Life. Knopf, 2004. ISBN 0-375-41457-6.
- Clinton Websites: Five Official Archived White House Websites from 1993 through 2001 (CD-ROM set). Core Federal Information Series, 2002. ISBN 1-59248-061-6.
- Conason, Joe and Lyons, Gene. The Hunting of the President: The Ten-Year Campaign to Destroy Bill and Hillary Clinton. St. Martin's Press, 2000. ISBN 0-684-83451-0.
- D'Antonio, Michael. The Hunting of Hillary: The Forty-Year Campaign to Destroy Hillary Clinton. Thomas Dunne Books, 2020. ISBN 125015460X.
- Davis, Lanny J. The Unmaking of the President 2016: How FBI Director James Comey Cost Hillary Clinton the Presidency. Scribner, 2018. ISBN 1-5011-7772-9.
- Estrich, Susan. The Case for Hillary Clinton. HarperCollins, 2005. ISBN 0-06-083988-0.
- Finlay, Anita. Dirty Words on Clean Skin: Sexism and Sabotage, a Hillary Supporter's Rude Awakening. Golden Middleway Books, 2012. ISBN 978-0615615066.
- Halley, Patrick. On the Road With Hillary: A Behind-the-Scenes Look at the Journey from Arkansas to the U.S. Senate. Viking Adult, 2002. ISBN 978-0670031115.
- Osborne, Claire G. (ed.) The Unique Voice of Hillary Rodham Clinton: A Portrait in Her Own Words. Avon Books, 1997. ISBN 978-0380974160.
- Shambaugh, Rebecca. Leadership Secrets of Hillary Clinton. McGraw-Hill, 2010. ISBN 978-0071664172.
- Tomasky, Michael. Hillary's Turn: Inside Her Improbable, Victorious Senate Campaign. Free Press, 2001. ISBN 0-684-87302-8.
- Westfall, Sandra Sobieraj and Kinney, Barbara. #StillWithHer: Hillary Rodham Clinton and the Moments That Sparked a Movement. Press Syndication Group, 2018. ISBN 1-7323196-3-4.
- Aldrich, Gary. Unlimited Access: An FBI Agent Inside the Clinton White House. Regnery Publishing, 1996. ISBN 0-89526-454-4.
- American Conservative Union. Hillary Rodham Clinton: What Every American Should Know. Green Hill Publishing, 2005. ISBN 0-89803-164-8.
- Andersen, Christopher. Bill and Hillary: The Marriage. William Morrow, 1999. ISBN 0-688-16755-1.
- Andersen, Christopher, American Evita: Hillary Clinton's Path to Power. HarperCollins, 2004. ISBN 0-06-056254-4.
- Bossie, David N. Hillary: The Politics of Personal Destruction. Thomas Nelson, 2008. ISBN 1-59555-124-7.
- Boswell, John, The Unshredded Files of Hillary and Bill Clinton. Broadway, 1996. ISBN 0-553-06763-X.
- Bozell, L. Brent with Tim Graham. Whitewash: How the News Media Are Paving Hillary Clinton's Path to the Presidency. Crown Forum, 2007. ISBN 0-307-34020-1.
- Brazile, Donna. Hacks: The Inside Story of the Break-ins and Breakdowns That Put Donald Trump in the White House. Hachette Books, 2017. ISBN 978-0316478519.
- Buchanan, Bay. The Extreme Makeover of Hillary (Rodham) Clinton. Regnery Publishing, 2007. ISBN 978-1596985070.
- Byrne, Gary J. Crisis of Character: A White House Secret Service Officer Discloses His Firsthand Experience with Hillary, Bill, and How They Operate. Center Street, 2016. ISBN 1-4555-6887-2.
- Carpenter, Amanda B. The Vast Right-Wing Conspiracy's Dossier on Hillary Clinton. Regnery Publishing, 2006. ISBN 1-59698-014-1.
- Casey, Wilson. 101 Reasons to Vote AGAINST Hillary. Skyhorse Publishing, 2016. ISBN 978-1634505796.
- Cashill, Jack. Ron Brown's Body: How One Man's Death Saved the Clinton Presidency and Hillary's Future. Thomas Nelson, 2004. ISBN 0-7852-6237-7.
- Corsi, Jerome R. Partners in Crime: The Clintons' Scheme to Monetize the White House for Personal Profit. WND Books, 2016. ISBN 1-944229-33-7.
- D'Souza, Dinesh. Stealing America: What My Experience with Criminal Gangs Taught Me about Obama, Hillary, and the Democratic Party. Broadside Books, 2015. ISBN 0-06-236671-8.
- D'Souza, Dinesh. Hillary's America: The Secret History of the Democratic Party. Regnery Publishing, 2016.
- Featherstone, Liza (ed.) False Choices: The Faux Feminism of Hillary Rodham Clinton. Verso, 2016. ISBN 1-78478-461-3.
- Goldberg, Jonah, Liberal Fascism: The Totalitarian Temptation from Mussolini to Hillary Clinton. Doubleday, 2007. ISBN 0-385-51184-1.
- Halper, Daniel. Clinton, Inc.: The Audacious Rebuilding of a Political Machine. Broadside Books, 2014. ISBN 0-06-231123-9.
- Henwood, Doug. My Turn: Hillary Clinton Targets the Presidency. Seven Stories Press, 2016. ISBN 1-68219-032-3.
- Hewitt, Hugh. The Queen: The Epic Ambition of Hillary and the Coming of a Second "Clinton Era". Center Street, 2015. ISBN 1-4555-6251-3.
- Horowitz, David and Poe, Richard. The Shadow Party : How Hillary Clinton, George Soros, and the Sixties Left Took Over the Democratic Party. Nelson Current, 2006. ISBN 1-59555-044-5.
- Hyman, Mark. Pardongate: How Bill & Hillary Clinton and Their Brothers Profited from Pardons. Highbridge Audio and Blackstone Publishing, 2021. ISBN 1-6651-7575-3.
- Ingraham, Laura. The Hillary Trap: Looking for Power in All the Wrong Places. Hyperion, 2000. ISBN 0-7868-6333-1.
- Jackson, Candace E. Their Lives: Women Targeted by the Clinton Machine. World Ahead Publishing, 2005.
- Jarrett, Gregg. The Russia Hoax: The Illicit Scheme to Clear Hillary Clinton and Frame Donald Trump. Broadside Books, 2018. ISBN 0-06-287274-5.
- Johnstone, Diana. Queen of Chaos: The Misadventures of Hillary Clinton. CounterPunch, 2015. ISBN 0-9897637-6-5.
- Klein, Aaron. The REAL Benghazi Story: What the White House and Hillary Don't Want You to Know. WND Books, 2014. ISBN 1-936488-86-8.
- Klein, Edward. The Truth About Hillary: What She Knew, When She Knew It, and How Far She'll Go to Become President. Penguin, 2005. ISBN 1-59523-006-8.
- Klein, Edward. Blood Feud: The Clintons vs. the Obamas. Regnery Publishing, 2014. ISBN 1-62157-313-3.
- Klein, Edward. Unlikeable: The Problem with Hillary. Regnery Publishing, 2015. ISBN 1-62157-378-8.
- Klein, Edward. Guilty as Sin: Uncovering New Evidence of Corruption and How Hillary Clinton and the Democrats Derailed the FBI Investigation. Regnery, 2016. iSBN
- Kyle, Dolly. Hillary the Other Woman: A Political Memoir. WND Books, 2016. ISBN 1-944229-45-0.
- Kuiper, Thomas. I've Always Been a Yankees Fan: Hillary Clinton in Her Own Words. World Ahead Publishing, 2006. ISBN 0-9746701-8-9.
- Limbacher, Carl. Hillary's Scheme: Inside the Next Clinton's Ruthless Agenda to Take the White House. Crown Publishing, 2003. ISBN 0-7615-3115-7.
- Milton, Joyce. The First Partner: Hillary Rodham Clinton. William Morrow and Company, 1999. ISBN 0-688-15501-4.
- Morris, Dick. Rewriting History. HarperCollins, 2004. ISBN 0-06-073668-2.
- Morris, Dick and McGann, Eileen. Condi vs. Hillary : The Next Great Presidential Race. HarperCollins, 2005. ISBN 0-06-083913-9.
- Morris, Dick and McGann, Eileen. Armageddon: How Trump Can Beat Hillary. Humanix Books, 2016.
- Noonan, Peggy. The Case Against Hillary Clinton. HarperCollins, 2000. ISBN 0-06-039340-8.
- Olson, Barbara. Hell to Pay: The Unfolding Story of Hillary Rodham Clinton. Regnery Publishing, 1999. ISBN 0-89526-197-9.
- Pierce, Anne R. A Perilous Path: The Misguided Foreign Policy of Barack Obama, Hillary Clinton and John Kerry. Post Hill Press, 2016. ISBN 1-68261-058-6.
- Podhoretz, John. Can She Be Stopped? : Hillary Clinton Will Be the Next President of the United States Unless .... Crown Publishing, 2006. ISBN 0-307-33730-8.
- Poe, Richard. Hillary's Secret War: The Clinton Conspiracy to Muzzle Internet Journalists. Nelson Current, 2004. ISBN 0-7852-6013-7.
- Regan, Turk. The Hillary Clinton Voodoo Kit: Stick It to Her, Before She Sticks It to You!. Running Press Book Publishers, 2007. ISBN 0-7624-2965-8.
- Schweizer, Peter. Clinton Cash: The Untold Story of How and Why Foreign Governments and Businesses Helped Make Bill and Hillary Rich. Harper, 2015. ISBN 0-06-236928-8.
- Starr, Ken. Contempt: A Memoir of the Clinton Investigation. Sentinel, 2018. ISBN 0-525-53613-2.
- Stone, Roger and Morrow, Robert. The Clintons' War On Women. Skyhorse Publishing, 2013. ISBN 1-5107-0678-X.
- Taylor, Scott. Trust Betrayed: Barack Obama, Hillary Clinton, and the Selling Out of America's National Security. Regnery Publishing, 2015. ISBN 1-62157-327-3.
- Tyrrell, R. Emmett and Davis, Mark. Madame Hillary: The Dark Road to the White House. Regnery Publishing, 2004. ISBN 0-89526-067-0.
- Wead, Doug. Game of Thorns: The Inside Story of Hillary Clinton's Failed Campaign and Donald Trump's Winning Strategy. Center Street, 2017.
- Willey, Kathleen. Target: Caught in the Crosshairs of Bill and Hillary Clinton. WND Books, 2007. ISBN 0-9746701-6-2.
- Allen, Jonathan and Parnes, Amie. HRC: State Secrets and the Rebirth of Hillary Clinton. Crown, 2014. ISBN 0-8041-3675-0.
- Allen, Jonathan and Parnes, Amie. Shattered: Inside Hillary Clinton's Doomed Campaign. Deckle Edge, 2017.
- Bamberger, Joanne (ed.). Love Her, Love Her Not: The Hillary Paradox. She Writes Press, 2015. ISBN 1-63152-806-8.
- Bernstein, Carl. A Woman in Charge: The Life of Hillary Rodham Clinton. Knopf, 2007. ISBN 0-375-40766-9.
- Bond, Alma H. Hillary Rodham Clinton: On The Couch. Bancroft Press, 2015. ISBN 1-61088-164-8.
- Boys, James D. Hillary Rising : The Politics, Persona and Policies of a New American Dynasty. Biteback Publishing, 2016. ISBN 1-84954-964-8.
- Brock, David. The Seduction of Hillary Rodham. Simon & Schuster, 1996. ISBN 0-684-83451-0.
- Chafe, William H. Bill and Hillary: The Politics of the Personal. Farrar, Straus and Giroux, 2012. ISBN 0-8090-9465-7.
- Chozick, Amy. Chasing Hillary: Ten Years, Two Presidential Campaigns, and One Intact Glass Ceiling. Harper, 2018. ISBN 0-06-241359-7.
- Flaherty, Peter and Flaherty, Timothy. The First Lady: A Comprehensive View of Hillary Rodham Clinton. Huntington House, 1996. ISBN 1-56384-119-3.
- Flinn, Susan K. (ed.). Speaking of Hillary: A Reader's Guide to the Most Controversial Woman in America. White Cloud Press, 2000. ISBN 1-883991-34-X.
- Ghattas, Kim. The Secretary: A Journey with Hillary Clinton from Beirut to the Heart of American Power. Times Books, 2013. ISBN 0-8050-9511-X.
- Gerth, Jeff and Van Natta Jr., Don. Her Way: The Hopes and Ambitions of Hillary Rodham Clinton. Little, Brown and Co., 2007. ISBN 0-316-01742-6.
- Harpaz, Beth. The Girls in the Van: Covering Hillary. Thomas Dunne Books, 2001. ISBN 0-312-28126-9.
- Heilemann, John and Halperin, Mark. Game Change: Obama and the Clintons, McCain and Palin, and the Race of a Lifetime. HarperCollins, 2010. ISBN 0-06-173363-6.
- King, Norman. Hillary: Her True Story. Carol Publishing, 1993. ISBN 1-55972-187-1.
- Kornblut, Anne E. Notes from the Cracked Ceiling: Hillary Clinton, Sarah Palin, and What It Will Take for a Woman to Win. Crown Books, 2009. ISBN 0-307-46425-3.
- Kreitner, Richard (ed.). Who is Hillary Clinton?: Two Decades of Answers from the Left. I.B.Tauris, 2016. ISBN 1-78453-635-0.
- Landler, Mark. Alter Egos: Hillary Clinton, Barack Obama, and the Twilight Struggle Over American Power. Random House, 2016. ISBN 0-8129-9885-5.
- Maraniss, David. First In His Class: A Biography of Bill Clinton. Simon & Schuster, 1995. ISBN 0-671-87109-9.
- Marshall, Sara. Hillary. New Word City, 2014.
- McNeely, Robert. The Making of Hillary Clinton: The White House Years. University of Texas Press, 2017.
- Morris, Roger. Partners in Power: The Clintons and Their America. Henry Holt, 1996. ISBN 0-8050-2804-8.
- Morrison, Susan (ed.). Thirty Ways of Looking at Hillary: Reflections by Women Writers. HarperCollins, 2008. ISBN 0-061-45593-8.
- Mueller, James E. Tag Teaming the Press: How Bill and Hillary Clinton Work Together to Handle the Media. Rowman & Littlefield, 2008. ISBN 0-7425-5548-8.
- Nelson, Rex and Martin, Philip. The Hillary Factor: The Story of America's First Lady. Gallen Publishing, 1993. ISBN 0-9636477-1-7.
- Oppenheimer, Jerry. State of a Union: Inside the Complex Marriage of Bill and Hillary Clinton. HarperCollins, 2000. ISBN 0-06-019392-1.
- Osborne, Claire G. The Unique Voice of Hillary Rodham Clinton: A Portrait in Her Own Words. Avon Books, 1997. ISBN 0-380-97416-9.
- Porter, Darwin and Prince, Danforth. Bill & Hillary: So This Is That Thing Called Love. Blood Moon Productions, 2015. ISBN 1-936003-47-3.
- Radcliffe, Donnie. Hillary Rodham Clinton : A First Lady for Our Time. Warner Books, 1993. ISBN 0-446-51766-6.
- Reid, Joy-Ann. Fracture: Barack Obama, the Clintons, and the Racial Divide. William Morrow, 2015. ISBN 0-06-230525-5.
- Renwick, Robin. Ready for Hillary?: Portrait of a President in Waiting. Biteback Publishing, 2015. ISBN 1-84954-788-2.
- Rogak, Lisa. Hillary Clinton in Her Own Words. Seal Press, 2014. ISBN 1-58005-533-8.
- Sanchez, Leslie. You've Come a Long Way, Maybe: Sarah, Michelle, Hillary, and the Shaping of the New American Woman . Palgrave Macmillan, 2009. ISBN 0-230-61816-2.
- Sheehy, Gail. Hillary's Choice. Random House, 1999. ISBN 0-375-50344-7.
- Smith, Sally Bedell. For Love of Politics: Bill and Hillary Clinton: The White House Years. Random House, 2007. ISBN 1-4000-6324-8.
- Traister, Rebecca. Big Girls Don't Cry: The Election that Changed Everything for American Women. Free Press, 2011. ISBN 1-4391-5029-X.
- Time magazine, editors of. Hillary: An American Life. Time, 2014. ISBN 1-61893-118-0.
- University Press, editors of. Hillary Clinton: The Biography. University Press, 2021. ISBN 979-8546963484.
- Walker, Diana. Hillary: The Photographs of Diana Walker. Simon & Schuster, 2014. ISBN 1-4767-6337-2.
- Warner, Judith. Hillary Clinton: The Inside Story (revised and updated). Signet, 1999. ISBN 0-451-19895-6.

=== Scholarly studies ===
- Burrell, Barbara. Public Opinion, the First Ladyship, and Hillary Rodham Clinton (2nd Ed). Taylor & Francis, 2001. ISBN 0-8153-3599-7.
- Cargile, Ivy A.M., Denise S. Davis, Jennifer L. Merolla, and Rachel VanSickle-Ward (eds.). The Hillary Effect: Perspectives on Clinton's Legacy. Bloomsbury Publishing, 2020. ISBN 1-83860-392-1.
- D'Antonio, Michael. The hunting of Hillary: the forty-year campaign to destroy Hillary Clinton (Macmillan+ ORM, 2020). online
- Gronnerud, Kathleen. Hillary Clinton: A Life in American History. ABC-CLIO, 2021. ISBN 1-4408-7418-2.
- Gutgold, Nichola D. Almost Madam President: Why Hillary Clinton 'Won' in 2008. Lexington Books, 2009. ISBN 0-7391-3371-3.
- Hudson, Valerie M. and Leidl, Patricia. The Hillary Doctrine: Sex and American Foreign Policy. Columbia University Press, 2015. ISBN 0-231-16492-0.
- Kelley, Colleen Elizabeth. The Rhetoric of First Lady Hillary Rodham Clinton: Crisis Management Discourse. Greenwood Publishing, 2001. ISBN 0-275-96695-X.
- Lawrence, Regina G. and Rose, Melody. Hillary Clinton's Race for the White House: Gender Politics and the Media on the Campaign Trail. Lynne Rienner Publishers, 2009. ISBN 1-58826-695-8.
- Parry-Giles, Shawn J. Hillary Clinton in the News: Gender and Authenticity in American Politics. University of Illinois Press, 2014. ISBN 0-252-07978-7.
- Parry-Giles, Shawn J., David S. Kaufer, and Xizhen Cai. Hillary Clinton's Career in Speeches: The Promises and Perils of Women's Rhetorical Adaptivity. Michigan State University Press, 2023. ISBN 1-60917-743-6.
- Sharma, Dinesh (ed.). The Global Hillary: Women's Political Leadership in Cultural Contexts. Routledge, 2016. ISBN 1-138-82974-9.
- Smith, Gary Scott. Do All the Good You Can: How Faith Shaped Hillary Rodham Clinton’s Politics. University of Illinois Press, 2023. ISBN 0-252-04531-9.
- Troy, Gil. Affairs of State: The Rise and Rejection of the Presidential Couple Since World War II Free Press, 1997. ISBN 0-6848-2820-0.
- Troy, Gil. Hillary Rodham Clinton: Polarizing First Lady. University Press of Kansas, 2006. ISBN 0-7006-1488-5.
- Van Raamsdonk, Alice Garcia. Hillary Rodham Clinton: De Activista Liberal a Arquétipo do Poder Feminino. Universitária Editora, 2000. ISBN 972-700-302-8.

=== Poetry ===
- Kunkel, Marianne. Hillary, Made Up. Stephen F. Austin University Press, 2018. ISBN 1-62288-210-5.

=== Children's and juvenile ===
- Abrams, Dennis. Hillary Rodham Clinton: Politician. Chelsea House Publications, 2009. ISBN 1604130776.
- Alexander, Heather. Who is Hillary Clinton? Penguin Young Readers Group, 2016. ISBN 0-448-49015-3.
- Armstrong, Jennifer. Bill and Hillary: Working Together in the White House. Sagebrush, 1999. ISBN 0613099575.
- Ashby, Ruth. Bill & Hillary Rodham Clinton. World Almanac Library, 2005. ISBN 0836857569.
- Bach, Julie. Hillary Rodham Clinton. Abdo Publishing, 1993. ISBN 1562392212.
- Bailey, Neal and Howe, Ryan (Illus.) Hillary Clinton (Female Force). Bluewater Productions, 2009. ISBN 1427638861.
- Blumenthal, Karen. Hillary Rodham Clinton: A Woman Living History. Feiwel & Friends, 2016. ISBN 1-250-06014-1.
- Boyd, Aaron. First Lady: The Story of Hillary Rodham Clinton. Morgan Reynolds Publishing, 1994. ISBN 1883846021.
- Burgan, Michael. Hillary Rodham Clinton: First Lady And Senator. Compass Point Books, 2008. ISBN 0756515882.
- Burgan, Michael. Hillary Clinton (Extraordinary Women). Ignite, 2014. ISBN 1410959414.
- Burlingame, Jeff. Hillary Clinton: A Life in Politics. Enslow Publishers, 2008. ISBN 0766028925.
- Carosella, Melissa. Hillary Clinton: First Lady, Senator, and Secretary of State. Teacher Created Materials, 2011. ISBN 1433315084.
- Corey, Shana and Adam Gustavson (Illus.) Hillary Clinton: The Life of a Leader. Random House Books for Young Readers, 2016. ISBN 1-101-93235-X.
- Doak, Robin S. Hillary Clinton. True Books, Children's Press, 2013. ISBN 0531238776.
- Driscoll, Laura. Hillary Clinton: An American Journey. Grosset & Dunlap, 2008. ISBN 978-0-448-44787-2.
- Eagan, Jill. Hillary Rodham Clinton. Gareth Stevens Publishers, 2010. ISBN 978-1-4339-2188-9.
- Epstein, Dwayne. Hillary Clinton. Lucent Books, 2007. ISBN 1420500317.
- Freedman, Jeri. Hillary Rodham Clinton: Profile of a Leading Democrat. Rosen Publishing Group, 2007. ISBN 1404219102.
- Freedman, Jeri. Hillary Rodham Clinton. ReadHowYouWant, 2008. ISBN 1427091528.
- Greenberg, Keith Elliot and Harston, Jerry (Illus.) Bill & Hillary: Working Together in the White House. Blackbirch Press, 1994. ISBN 1567110673.
- Guernsey, Joann Bren. Hillary Rodham Clinton: A New Kind of First Lady. Lerner Publishing Group, 1993. ISBN 0822523728.
- Guernsey, Joann Bren. Hillary Rodham Clinton. First Avenue Editions, 2005. ISBN 082259613X.
- Guernsey, Joann Bren. Hillary Rodham Clinton: Secretary of State. Twenty-First Century Books, 2010. ISBN 0761351221.
- Gullo, Jim. The Importance Of Hillary Rodham Clinton. Lucent Books, 2003. ISBN 159018310X.
- Kawa, Katie. Hillary Clinton. Powerkids Press, 2016. ISBN 1-5081-4806-6.
- Kent, Deborah. Hillary Rodham Clinton: 1947. Children's Press, 1999. ISBN 0516206443.
- Kozar, Richard. Hillary Rodham Clinton. Chelsea House Publications, 1998. ISBN 079104713X.
- Krull, Kathleen and Bates, Amy June (Illus.) Hillary Rodham Clinton: Dreams Taking Flight. Simon & Schuster Children's Publishing, 2008. ISBN 1416971297. Reissued in new edition 2015, ISBN 1-4814-5113-8.
- Levert, Suzanne. Hillary Rodham Clinton. Topeka Bindery, 1999. ISBN 0785732365.
- Levinson, Cynthia. Hillary Rodham Clinton: Do All the Good You Can. Balzer + Bray, 2016. ISBN 0-06-238730-8.
- Levy, Dena B., and Krassas, Nicole R. Hillary Clinton : A Biography. Greenwood Press, 2007. ISBN 0313339155.
- Loewen, Nancy. Hillary Rodham Clinton. Creative Education, 1998. ISBN 0886826365.
- Maida, Jerome. Political Power: Hillary Rodham Clinton. Bluewater Productions, 2011. ISBN 1450744338.
- Markel, Michelle and Pham, LeUyen (illus.). Hillary Rodham Clinton: Some Girls Are Born to Lead. Balzer + Bray, 2016. ISBN 0-06-238122-9.
- Mattern, Joanne. Hillary Rodham Clinton. Checkerboard Books, 2007. ISBN 1599287927.
- Milton, Joyce. The Story of Hillary Rodham Clinton. Yearling, 1994. ISBN 0440409667.
- Paley, Rebecca and Melissa Manwill. A Girl Named Hillary: The True Story of Hillary Clinton. Scholastic, 2018 ISBN 1338193023.
- Ryan Jr., Bernard. Hillary Rodham Clinton: First Lady and Senator. Ferguson Publishing Company, 2004. ISBN 0816055440.
- Shepherd, Jodie. Hillary Clinton. C. Press/F. Watts Trade, 2015. ISBN 0531209946.
- Sherrow, Victoria. Hillary Rodham Clinton. Dillon Press, 1993. ISBN 0875186211.
- Spain, Valerie. Meet Hillary Rodham Clinton. Random House Books for Young Readers, 1994. ISBN 0679950893.
- Stacey, T. J. Hillary Rodham Clinton: Activist First Lady. Enslow Publishers, 1994. ISBN 089490583X.
- Tracy, Kathleen. The Historic Fight for the 2008 Democratic Presidential Nomination: The Clinton View. Mitchell Lane Publishers, 2009. ISBN 978-1-58415-731-1.
- Wagner, Heather Lehr. Hillary Rodham Clinton. Chelsea House Publications, 2004. ISBN 0791077357.
- Wheeler, Jill C. Hillary Rodham Clinton. ABDO & Daughters, 2002. ISBN 1577657411.
- Winter, Jonah and Colón, Raul (illus.). Hillary. Schwartz & Wade, 2016. ISBN 0-553-53388-6.

=== Comics and graphic novels ===
- Bailey, Neal and Ryan Howe (artist). Female Force: Hillary Clinton #1. Bluewater Productions, 2009. ASIN: 194872443X [#2 and #3 subsequently published as well]
- Bailey, Neal and several (artists). Sarah Palin, Michelle Obama, Hillary Clinton & Caroline Kennedy: Female Force VI. Bluewater Productions, 2009. ASIN: B003JTHVR4
- Frizell, Michael L. and Aleksandar Bozic (artist). Female Force: Hillary Clinton: Road to Secretary of State. Bluewater Productions, 2015. ASIN: B00WTCT1MK
- Frizell, Michael L. and Aleksandar Bozic, Joe Paradise and Ryan Howe (artists). Female Force: Hillary Clinton: The Graphic Novel. Stormfront Entertainment, 2015. ASIN: B00Z3IH08E
- Frizell, Michael L. and Joe Paradise (artist). Female Force: Hillary Clinton: The Road to the White House. Bluewater Productions, 2015.
- Frizell, Michael L. Political Power: Election 2016: Clinton, Bush, Trump, Sanders, & Paul. TidalWave Productions, 2018. ASIN: 194872443X

=== Coloring and play books ===
- Cuhwald, Caitlin. Hillary Rodham Clinton Presidential Playset: Includes Ten Paper Dolls, Three Rooms of Fun, Fashion Accessories, and More! Quirk Books, 2015. ISBN 1-59474-831-4.
- LeBorts, George and Wojciech Wilk (illus.). The Very Unofficial Hillary Clinton Coloring Book. Strobooks, 2007. ISBN 978-0979493706.
- Ramon, Valentin (illus.). Hillary: The Coloring Book. Ulysses Press, 2014. ISBN 978-1612433691.
- Schumacher, Maria. Circle It, Hillary Clinton Facts, Word Search, Puzzle Book. Lowry Global Media, 2016. ISBN 978-1-945512-03-2.
- Schumacher, Maria and Schumacher, Mark. Special Edition, Two Books in One!!! Circle It, Hillary Clinton Facts and Donald Trump Facts, Word Search, Puzzle Book. Lowry Global Media, 2016. ISBN 978-1-945512-09-4.

=== Fictional ===
- Bowen, Michael. HILLARY!: How America's First Woman President Won The White House. Branden Books, 2003. ISBN 0-8283-2081-0.
- Cowan, Bill and Carlson, Richard W. Snatching Hillary, A Satirical Novel. Tulip Hill Publishing, 2014. ISBN 0692337008.
- Hnath, Lucas. Hillary and Clinton (script of play). Theatre Communications Group, 2019. ISBN 1559369620.
- Moe, John. The Deleted Emails of Hillary Clinton: A Parody. Three Rivers Press, 2015. ISBN 1-101-90607-3.
- Shaw, Vera G. and Reis, Emmy (illus.). Hillary Clinton Haiku: Her Rise to Power, Syllable by Syllable, Pantsuit by Pantsuit. Twelve, 2015. ISBN 1-4555-3167-7.
- Sittenfeld, Curtis. Rodham. Random House, 2020. ISBN 978-0-399-59091-7.

== Scholarly articles and chapters ==
=== By Clinton ===
- Rodham, Hillary D. "There Is Only The Fight...": An Analysis of the Alinsky Model. Senior honors thesis, Wellesley College, 1969. Available at the college archives.
- Rodham, Hillary (1973). "Children Under the Law". Harvard Educational Review. 43 (4): 487–514. doi:10.17763/haer.43.4.e14676283875773k. Reprinted in (eds.) Rochelle Beck, Heather Bastow Weiss, The Rights of Children, Harvard Educational Review Reprint Series, No. 9, 1974, pp. 1–28.
- Rodham, Hillary (June 1977). "Children's Policies: Abandonment and Neglect". Yale Law Journal. 86 (7): 1522–1531. doi:10.2307/795794. JSTOR 795794.
- Rodham, Hillary. "Children's Rights: A Legal Perspective", in (eds.) Patricia A. Vardin, Ilene N. Brody, Children's Rights: Contemporary Perspectives, Teacher's College Press, 1979. pp. 21–36.
- Clinton, Hillary Rodham (Spring–Summer 1996). "Women's Rights Are Human Rights". Women's Studies Quarterly. 24 (1/2): 98–101. JSTOR 40004518.
- Clinton, Hillary Rodham (January 2004). "Remembering Burke Marshall" (PDF). Yale Law Journal. 113 (4): 787–790. doi:10.2307/4135677. JSTOR 4135677.
- Clinton, Hillary Rodham (November–December 2010). "Leading Through Civilian Power: Redefining American Diplomacy and Development". Foreign Affairs. 89 (6): 13–24.
- Clinton, Hillary. "America's Pacific Century", Foreign Policy, issue 189, pp. 56–63 (October 11, 2011).
- Clinton, Hillary (November–December 2020). "A National Security Reckoning: How Washington Should Think About Power". Foreign Affairs. 99 (6): 88–99.

=== By others ===
- Abdullah, Tawfiq Ola. "Framing of the US’2016 Presidential election: a content analysis of Donald Trump and Hillary Clinton’s campaign speeches." Atlantic Journal of Communication 30.3 (2022): 297-315.
- Anderson, Karrin Vasby. "Hillary Rodham Clinton as 'Madonna': The Role of Metaphor and Oxymoron in Image Restoration". Women's Studies in Communication, Vol. 25, 2002.
- Anderson, Karrin Vasby. "Presidential Pioneer or Campaign Queen?: Hillary Clinton and the First-Timer/Frontrunner Double Bind." Rhetoric & Public Affairs, Vol. 20, No. 3, Fall 2017.
- Bhatia, Sudeep, and Geoffrey P. Goodwin and Lukasz Walasek. "Trait Associations for Hillary Clinton and Donald Trump in News Media: A Computational Analysis." Social Psychological and Personality Science, 2018.
- Bostdorff, Denise M. "Hillary Rodham Clinton and Elizabeth Dole as Running 'Mates' in the 1996 Campaign: Parallels in the Rhetorical Constraints of First Ladies and Vice Presidents" in Robert E. Denton Jr., ed., The 1996 Presidential Campaign: A Communication Perspective, pp 199–228. Praeger, 1998. ISBN 0-2759-5681-4.
- Brown, Mary Ellen. "Feminism and Cultural Politics: Television Audiences and Hillary Rodham Clinton." Political Communication (2001).
- Burden, Barry C. and Mughan, Anthony. "Public opinion and Hillary Rodham Clinton", Public Opinion Quarterly, Vol. 63, No. 2 (Summer 1999).
- Burrell, Barbara C. "The Office of the First Lady and Public Policymaking" in MaryAnne Borrelli and Janet M. Martin, eds. The Other Elites: Women, Politics, and Power in the Executive Branch, pp 169–88. Rienner, 1997. ISBN 1-55587-658-7.
- Carlin, Diana B. and Winfrey, Kelly L. "Have you come a long way, baby? Hillary Clinton, Sarah Palin, and sexism in 2008 campaign coverage", Communication Studies (2009).
- Choma, Becky L. and Yaniv Hanoch. "Cognitive ability and authoritarianism: Understanding support for Trump and Clinton." Personality and Individual Differences, Vol. 106 (February 2017).
- Cohen, Jeffrey E. "The Polls: Public Favorability toward the First Lady, 1993-1999" Presidential Studies Quarterly. Volume: 30. Issue: 3. 2000, pp 575+.
- Conroy, Meredith, Danielle Joesten Martin, and Kim L. Nalder. "Gender, sex, and the role of stereotypes in evaluations of Hillary Clinton and the 2016 presidential candidates." Journal of Women, Politics & Policy 41.2 (2020): 194-218.
- Crowson, Howard Michael and Joyce A. Brandes. "Differentiating Between Donald Trump and Hillary Clinton Voters Using Facets of Right-Wing Authoritarianism and Social-Dominance Orientation." Psychological Reports, 2017.
- DuBosar, Eliana. "Assessing differences in the framing of Hillary Clinton and Donald Trump during the 2016 Presidential Election." Society 59.2 (2022): 169-180.
- Enli, Gunn. "Twitter as arena for the authentic outsider: exploring the social media campaigns of Trump and Clinton in the 2016 US presidential election." European Journal of Communication Vol. 32, No. 1 (2017).
- Erichsen, Kristen, et al. "Bitchifying Hillary: Trump supporters’ vilification of Clinton during the 2016 presidential election." Social Currents 7.6 (2020): 526-542.
- Gardetto, Darlaine C. "Hillary Rodham Clinton, Symbolic Gender Politics, and The New York Times: January–November 1992", Political Communication (1997).
- Harmer, Emily, Heather Savigny, and Orly Siow. "Trump, Clinton, and the gendering of newspaper discourse about the 2016 US presidential election debates." Women's Studies in Communication 44.1 (2021): 81-101.
- Holloway, Rachel L. "The Clintons and the Health Care Crisis: Opportunity Lost, Promise Unfulfilled" in Robert E. Denton Jr. and Rachel L. Holloway, eds. The Clinton Presidency: Images, Issues, and Communication Strategies, pp. 159–88. Praeger, 1996. ISBN 0-2759-5110-3.
- Jones, Jennifer J. "Talk 'Like a Man': The Linguistic Styles of Hillary Clinton, 1992–2013". Perspectives on Politics, 14(3) (2016), 625–642.
- Jordan, GH. "Agents of (Incremental) Change: From Myra Bradwell to Hillary Clinton", Nevada Law Journal, 2008.
- Kellerman, Barbara. "The Enabler," Presidential Studies Quarterly Volume: 28. Issue: 4. 1998, pp 887–893.
- Lather, Patti. "Dear Hillary." International Journal of Qualitative Studies in Education, Vol. 30, No. 10, 2017.
- Lau, Vienne W., Michelle C. Bligh, and Jeffrey C. Kohles. "Leadership as a reflection of who we are: social identity, media portrayal, and evaluations of Hillary Clinton in the 2016 US Presidential election." Sex Roles 82.7 (2020): 422-437. online
- Lawrence, Regina G., and Melody Rose. "Bringing Out the Hook: Exit Talk in Media Coverage of Hillary Clinton and Past Presidential Campaigns." Political Research Quarterly (2010).
- Lehn, Melody. "Strong Frontrunner, Weak Woman: Hillary Rodham Clinton and the Politics of Pile On" in Clarke Rountree, ed. Venomous Speech: Problems with American Political Discourse on the Right and Left, Vol. 2, pp. 223–236. Praeger, 2013. ISBN 978-0-313-39866-7.
- Lim, E.T. "Gendered Metaphors of Women in Power: The Case of Hillary Clinton as Madonna, Unruly Woman, Bitch and Witch". In: Ahrens K. (ed.) Politics, Gender and Conceptual Metaphors. Palgrave Macmillan, 2009.
- McGinley, Ann. "Hillary Clinton, Sarah Palin, and Michelle Obama: Performing Gender, Race, and Class on the Campaign Trail." Denver University Law Review vol. 86 no. 709 (2008–2009).
- Muir, Janette Kenner and Lisa M. Benitez, "Redefining the Role of the First Lady: The Rhetorical Style of Hillary Rodham Clinton" in Robert E. Denton Jr. and Rachel L. Holloway, eds. The Clinton Presidency: Images, Issues, and Communication Strategies, pp. 139–58. Praeger, 1996. ISBN 0-2759-5110-3
- Nai, Alessandro and Jürgen Maier. "Perceived personality and campaign style of Hillary Clinton and Donald Trump." Personality and Individual Differences, Vol. 121, January 2018.
- Nawabdin, Fatemah. "Perspectives on Gender Stereotypes: How Did Gender-Based Perceptions Put Hillary Clinton at an Electoral Disadvantage in the 2016 Election?." Statistics, Politics and Policy 12.2 (2021): 457-479. online
- Quyen, Pham Thi. "A critical discourse analysis of Hillary Clinton’s speech 'women’s rights are human rights'." VNU Journal of Foreign Studies 38.5 (2022): 147-166. online
- Ratliff, Katie A. et al. "Engendering support: Hostile sexism predicts voting for Donald Trump over Hillary Clinton in the 2016 U.S. presidential election." Group Processes & Intergroup Relations, 2017.
- Shafer, Emily Fitzgibbons. "Hillary Rodham Versus Hillary Clinton: Consequences of Surname Choice in Marriage." Gender Issues, Vol. 34, No. 4, December 2017.
- Simien, Evelyn M. and Sarah Cote Hampson. "Hillary Clinton and the Women Who Supported Her: Emotional Attachments and the 2008 Democratic Presidential Primary." Du Bois Review: Social Science Research on Race, Vol. 14, No. 1, Spring 2017.
- Sorrentino, Jasmin, Martha Augoustinos, and Amanda LeCouteur. "“Deal me in”: Hillary Clinton and gender in the 2016 US presidential election." Feminism & Psychology 32.1 (2022): 23-43.
- Stewart, Patrick A. et al. "Visual Presentation Style 2: Influences on Perceptions of Donald Trump and Hillary Clinton Based on Visual Presentation Style During the Third 2016 Presidential Debate." American Behavioral Scientist, 2017.
- Susatyo, Budi. "Study of Language Style in Hillary Clinton's speech." Journal of English Teaching, Literature, and Applied Linguistics (2022). online
- Swank, Eric. "Who Voted for Hillary Clinton? Sexual Identities, Gender, and Family Influences." Journal of GLBT Family Studies, Vol. 14, No. 1–2, 2018. online
- Taylor, Cheryl A. and Charles G. Lord, Rusty B. McIntyre, René M. Paulson. "The Hillary Clinton effect: When the same role model inspires or fails to inspire improved performance under stereotype threat", Group Processes & Intergroup Relations (2011).
- Templin, Charlotte. "Hillary Clinton as threat to gender norms: Cartoon images of the first lady", Journal of Communication Inquiry (1999).
- Thomas, JB. "Dumb blondes, Dan Quayle, and Hillary Clinton: Gender, sexuality, and stupidity in jokes", Journal of American Folklore (1997).
- Uscinski, Joseph E., and Lily J. Goren. "What's in a Name? Coverage of Senator Hillary Clinton during the 2008 Democratic Primary." Political Research Quarterly (2010).
- Visser, Beth A. and Angela S. Book, Anthony A. Volk. "Is Hillary dishonest and Donald narcissistic? A HEXACO analysis of the presidential candidates' public personas." Personality and Individual Differences Vol. 106 (February 2017).
- Wang, Y., Y. Feng, J. Luo, and X. Zhang, "Pricing the woman card: Gender politics between Hillary Clinton and Donald Trump," 2016 IEEE International Conference on Big Data, 2016, pp. 2541–2544.
- Winfield, Betty Houchin. "The making of an image: Hillary Rodham Clinton and American journalists", Political Communication (1997).
- Wright, Joshua D. and Monica F.Tomlinson, "Personality profiles of Hillary Clinton and Donald Trump: Fooled by your own politics." Personality and Individual Differences, Vol. 128 (July 2018).
- Zhao, Yuqing, Ting Wu, and Huiyu Zhang. "A typical politician vs. a lunatic businessman: Different language styles of Hillary Clinton and Donald Trump." International Journal of English Linguistics 10.2 (2020): 26-39. online

== Columns by Clinton ==
- Complete collection of Hillary Rodham Clinton's "Talking It Over" newspaper columns, written for Creators Syndicate from 1995–2000
- Clinton, Hillary Rodham. "There is no such thing as 'other peoples' children", Los Angeles Times (March 14, 1995).
- Clinton, Hillary Rodham (May 14, 1995). "Investing In Sisterhood: An Agenda for the World's Women". The Washington Post. Archived from the original on September 24, 2015 – via HighBeam Research.
- Clinton, Hillary Rodham. "Arts for Our Sake", The New York Times (June 21, 1995).
- Clinton, Hillary Rodham. "Our Chance for Healthier Children", The New York Times (August 5, 1997).
- Clinton, Hillary Rodham. "With Fear, Hope, Love and Best Wishes for My Daughter, Chelsea", Los Angeles Times (September 18, 1997).
- Clinton, Hillary Rodham [with Joe Lieberman]. "Keep welfare reform momentum", The Spokesman-Review via The Washington Post (May 4, 2002).
- Clinton, Hillary Rodham. "Helping the Jobless", The New York Times (September 20, 2002).
- Clinton, Hillary Rodham. "Now Can We Talk About Health Care?", The New York Times (April 18, 2004).
- Clinton, Hillary Rodham. "Give New York Its Fair Share of Homeland Funds", The New York Times (August 22, 2004).
- Clinton, Hillary [with Bill Frist]. "How to Heal Health Care", The Washington Post (August 25, 2004).
- Clinton, Hillary [with Carl Levin]. "North Korea's Rising Urgency" (July 5, 2005).
- Clinton, Hillary Rodham [with Cecile Richards]. "Blocking Care for Women", The New York Times (September 19, 2008).
- Clinton, Hillary Rodham. "Partnering Against Human Trafficking", The Washington Post (June 17, 2009).
- Clinton, Hillary. "A New Strategic and Economic Dialogue With China", The Wall Street Journal (July 27, 2009).
- Clinton, Hillary. "Hillary Clinton: All Nations Must Play a Part in Afghanistan Mission", The Telegraph (December 4, 2009)
- Clinton, Hillary Rodham. "The U.S. Is on Board", The International Herald Tribune (December 15, 2009).
- Clinton, Hillary. "The Balkans Deserve This", The Guardian (May 30, 2010).
- Clinton, Hillary Rodham. "A Partnership of Democracies", Times of India (June 4, 2010)
- Clinton, Hillary Rodham [with Robert M. Gates]. "Clinton and Gates: Why the Senate should ratify New START", The Washington Post (November 15, 2010).
- Clinton, Hillary. "Clean stoves' would save lives, cut pollution", USA Today (May 6, 2011)
- Clinton, Hillary. "Independence Day for South Sudan", The Washington Post (July 9, 2011).
- Clinton, Hillary Rodham [with Carl Bildt]. "Wallenberg's Life-Giving Legacy", The New York Times (January 17, 2012).
- Clinton, Hillary. "Hillary Clinton: Trade With Russia Is a Win-Win", The Wall Street Journal (June 19, 2012).
- Clinton, Hillary. "The Art of Smart Power", New Statesman (July 18, 2012)
- Clinton, Hillary Rodham [with Catherine Ashton]. "Ukraine's Troubling Trends", The International Herald Tribune (October 25, 2012).
- Clinton, Hillary Rodham. "Hillary Clinton reviews Henry Kissinger's 'World Order'", The Washington Post, (September 4, 2014).
- Clinton, Hillary Rodham [with Bill Frist]. "Save the Children's Insurance", The New York Times (February 13, 2015).
- Clinton, Hillary Rodham. "American Democracy Is in Crisis", The Atlantic (September 16, 2018).
- Clinton, Hillary. "Mueller documented a serious crime against all Americans. Here's how to respond." The Washington Post (April 24, 2019).
- Clinton, Hillary Rodham. "Power Shortage". The Atlantic (October 15, 2020).
- Clinton, Hillary Rodham. "Trump should be impeached. But that alone won't remove white supremacy from America." The Washington Post (January 11, 2021).
- Clinton, Hillary Rodham. "The Fight for Voting Rights Is The Fight For Our Democracy". Democracy Docket (July 7, 2021).
- Clinton, Hillary Rodham [with Dan Schwerin]. "A State of Emergency for Democracy". The Atlantic (February 25, 2022).
- Clinton, Hillary Rodham. "The Weaponization of Loneliness". The Atlantic (August 7, 2023).
