= Roger Gould =

Roger Gould may refer to:

- Roger Gould (psychiatrist), American writer and psychiatrist
- Roger V. Gould (1962–2002), American sociologist
- Roger Gould (rugby union) (born 1957), Australian rugby union player
