= Gary Byrne =

Gary Byrne may refer to:

- Gary Byrne (soccer) (born 1954), Australian soccer player
- Gary Byrne (politician), member of the Indiana Senate
- Gary J. Byrne, author of Crisis of Character
