= Daniel Halper =

American political writer

Daniel Halper is an American political writer. He previously served as the online editor of the now-defunct neoconservative magazine The Weekly Standard until a management change at that publication in 2016 and from 2016 to 2017 was employed by the New York Post. Halper authored Clinton, Inc.: The Audacious Rebuilding of a Political Machine (ISBN 978-0062311238), an unflattering 2014 biography of the Clinton family.

In 2017, he became an editor for the Drudge Report, replacing Joseph Curl. Halper's hiring coincided with the Drudge family's retreat from the public sphere (Drudge's father sold his own site Refdesk the same year to the same company that also took over the Report's advertising account at the same time, and by 2019 unconfirmed reports had emerged that Matt Drudge had sold the Report) and may have been a factor in the Report having a substantial change in editorial direction.

In June 2020 Halper published the book "A Convenient Death: The Mysterious Demise of Jeffrey Epstein" together with Alana Goodman.

== Biography ==
Halper is a graduate of Tufts University.

== See also ==
- List of books by or about Hillary Rodham Clinton
