= Hillary Rodham senior thesis =

1969 American college thesis on Saul Alinsky

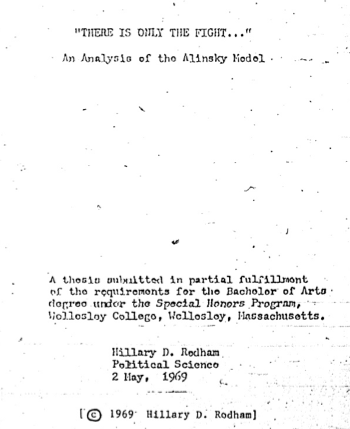
Cover page of the thesis

In 1969, Hillary Rodham wrote a 92-page senior thesis for Wellesley College about the views advocated by community organizer Saul Alinsky, titled "There Is Only the Fight . . . ": An Analysis of the Alinsky Model.

While the work by Rodham as a college student was the subject of much speculation in articles and biographies of Hillary Rodham Clinton in the 1990s, access to the thesis was limited by the college, at the request of the Clinton White House, during her time as First Lady of the United States.

== Thesis ==
Rodham researched the thesis by interviewing Alinsky and others, and by conducting visits to low-income areas of Chicago (nearby to her hometown, Park Ridge, Illinois) and observing Community Action Programs in those areas. Her thesis adviser was Wellesley professor of political science Alan Schechter.

The thesis was sympathetic to Alinsky's critiques of government antipoverty programs, but criticized Alinsky's methods as largely ineffective, all the while describing Alinsky's personality as appealing. The thesis sought to fit Alinsky into a line of American social activists, including Eugene V. Debs, Martin Luther King Jr., and Walt Whitman. The thesis concluded that "[Alinsky's] power/conflict model is rendered inapplicable by existing social conflicts" and that Alinsky's model had not expanded nationally due to "the anachronistic nature of small autonomous conflict".

A 2007 review in The New York Times summarized Rodham's thesis as follows: "Ms. Rodham endorsed Mr. Alinsky's central critique of government antipoverty programs—that they tended to be too top-down and removed from the wishes of individuals. But the student leader split with Mr. Alinsky over a central point. He vowed to 'rub raw the sores of discontent' and compel action through agitation. This, she believed, ran counter to the notion of change within the system." In 2016, reporter Michael Kruse quotes the thesis and describes a centrist theme:

"Alinsky's conclusion that the 'ventilation' of hostilities is healthy in certain situations is valid, but across-the-board 'social catharsis' cannot be prescribed", she wrote. "Catharsis has a way of perpetuating itself so that it becomes an end in itself." She continued: "Interestingly, this society seems to be in a transition period, caught between conflict and consensus." It was clear where this 21-year-old stood: "... as our 'two societies'—the establishment, the anti-establishment—"move further apart contrived conflict serves to exacerbate the polarization.

In the acknowledgements and end notes of the thesis, Rodham thanked Alinsky for two interviews and a job offer. She declined the latter, saying that "after spending a year trying to make sense out of [Alinsky's] inconsistency, I need three years of legal rigor." The thesis was praised by all four of its reviewers and Rodham, an honors student at Wellesley, received an A grade on it.

== White House and Wellesley limiting of access ==
The work was unnoticed until Hillary Rodham Clinton entered the White House as first lady. Clinton researchers and political opponents sought it out, contending it contained evidence that Rodham had held strong far-left or socialist views.

In early 1993, the White House requested that Wellesley not release the thesis to anyone. Wellesley complied, instituting a new rule that closed access to the thesis of any sitting U.S. president or First lady, a rule that in practice applied only to Rodham. Biographer Donnie Radcliffe instead used extensive recollections from Schechter to describe the thesis in her biography published later that year, Hillary Rodham Clinton : A First Lady for Our Time. David Brock was similarly unable to access the thesis for his book The Seduction of Hillary Rodham (1996), writing that it was "under lock and key". Instead, he, too, used some of Schechter's recollections. By the mid-1990s, Clinton critics seized upon the restricted access as a sure sign that the thesis held politically explosive contents that would reveal her hidden radicalism or extremism.

Syndicated columnists Jack Anderson and Jan Moller tried to gain access in 1999, but they were rebuffed by both Wellesley and the White House. Writing in their "Washington Merry-Go-Round" column, they surmised that the thesis's conclusion might be at variance with Clinton Administration policies, saying they had "discovered the subject of her thesis: a criticism of Lyndon B. Johnson's 'War on Poverty' programs. Mrs. Clinton's conclusion? Community-based anti-poverty programs don't work." Clinton biographer Barbara Olson wrote in her 1999 book Hell to Pay: The Unfolding Story of Hillary Rodham Clinton that, "The contents of Hillary's thesis, and why she would want it hidden from public view, have long been the subject of intense interest. Most likely, she does not want the American people to know the extent to which she internalized and assimilated the beliefs and methods of Saul Alinsky."

== Thesis made available ==
The thesis was made available after the Clintons left the White House in 2001 by the Wellesley College archives.

In 2001, Political USA put what it claimed was a copy of Clinton's thesis up for sale on eBay. It was claimed that this copy had been mailed anonymously to the campaign of Clinton's 2000 United States Senate opponent Rick Lazio, before being obtained by Political USA. Political USA, a right-leaning organization, advertised it by exclaiming, "Hillary Clinton doesn't want you to see this". Bidding reached $50,000 before eBay pulled the listing over copyright concerns.

In her memoir Living History (2003), Clinton mentioned the thesis only briefly, saying she had agreed with some of Alinsky's ideas but had not agreed with his belief that it was impossible to "change the system" from inside.

Years after the Clintons left the White House, the thesis still held its allure. For example, in 2005, columnist Peggy Noonan speculated that it was "the Rosetta Stone" of Hillary biographies defining "how to change the American political culture". Clinton staffers still did not discuss why it had been sealed.

The thesis received public exposure in 2005 when NBC News investigative reporter Bill Dedman sent his journalism class from Boston University to read the thesis and write articles about it. The thesis is also available through interlibrary loan on microfilm, a method reporter Dorian Davis used when he obtained it in January 2007, and sent it to Noonan and to Amanda Carpenter at Human Events, who wrote a piece on it in March.

The suppression of the thesis from 1993 to 2001 at the request of the Clinton White House was documented in March 2007 by reporter Dedman, who read the thesis at the Wellesley library and interviewed Rodham's thesis adviser. Dedman found that the thesis did not disclose much of Rodham's own views. A Boston Globe assessment found the thesis nuanced, and said that "While [Rodham] defends Alinsky, she is also dispassionate, disappointed, and amused by his divisive methods and dogmatic ideology." Schechter told Dedman, writing for msnbc.com, that There Is Only The Fight . . . was a good thesis, and that its suppression by the Clinton White House "was a stupid political decision, obviously, at the time."

Interest in the thesis and in Clinton's relationship with Alinsky continued during the 2008 Democratic Party presidential primaries, as Clinton battled Illinois Senator Barack Obama, who had also been reported to have been exposed to Alinsky-style ideas and methods during his time as a Chicago community organizer.
