= Shrink Yourself =

Shrink Yourself: Break Free from Emotional Eating Forever
- First edition
- Author: Roger Gould
- Language: English
- Subject: Emotional eating
- Publisher: Wiley
- ISBN: 978-0470044858

Shrink Yourself: Break Free From Emotional Eating Forever (2007) is a book on emotional eating by Roger Gould. In Shrink Yourself, Gould suggests that the powerlessness people feel over food cravings is a cover-up for a deeper sense of powerlessness in five other areas of their lives. By recovering one's power in five key areas, Gould suggests one also recovers power over food cravings.

The five areas he identifies are:

1. The Self-Doubt Layer: feeling powerless about how to deal with self-doubts.
2. The Frustration/Reward Layer: feeling powerless about how to get real satisfaction in life.
3. The Safety Layer: feeling powerless to insure personal safety.
4. The Rebellion Layer: feeling powerless to appropriately assert personal independence.
5. The Emptiness Layer: feeling powerless to fill oneself up when feeling empty inside.
