= Alan Schechter =

Alan Schechter (born 1936) is a political scientist. He is Professor Emeritus of Political Science at Wellesley College in Massachusetts.

He was educated at Amherst College, where he received his AB, and at Columbia University, where he earned his PhD.

Schechter was Hillary Rodham's advisor during her years at Wellesley College and supervised her senior thesis; Susan Estrich's book The Case for Hillary Clinton mentions her experience also writing an honors thesis for Schechter (at a different time). He remains involved with the college, running the Wellesley in Washington internship program, in which Rodham participated as a student and which continues to send approximately twenty women to Washington for internships each summer.

Schechter is the former Chairman, Vice-Chairman, and member of the J. William Fulbright Foreign Scholarship Board (Fulbright Program), a Presidential appointment.
