= A Woman in Charge =

2007 book by Carl Bernstein

A Woman in Charge: The Life of Hillary Rodham Clinton
- First edition
- Author: Carl Bernstein
- Language: English
- Subject: Hillary Clinton
- Genre: Biography
- Publisher: Alfred A. Knopf
- Publication date: June 5, 2007
- Publication place: United States
- Media type: Print (hardcover and paperback)
- Pages: 640

A Woman in Charge: The Life of Hillary Rodham Clinton is a biography of Hillary Clinton, written by Carl Bernstein and published on June 5, 2007 by Alfred A. Knopf.

== Background ==
Bernstein spent eight years working on the book. He is said to have interviewed around 200 people in connection with his research. He did not receive cooperation from the Clintons for the project.

The existence of the work was first announced by publisher Knopf on April 23, 2007, with a scheduled publication date of June 19, 2007.

A Woman in Charge was released at the same time as another mainstream biography of Clinton, Jeff Gerth and Don Van Natta Jr.'s Her Way: The Hopes and Ambitions of Hillary Rodham Clinton. The respective publishers both moved up the release dates of their books with the publication of the Gerth-Van Natta work moved up from August. In the end, A Woman in Charge came out first by three days.

Beyond scheduling, there was some feuding between the publishers. The editor in chief of Little, Brown and Company, which was publishing Her Way, made reference to how Knopf had published Bill Clinton's autobiography My Life and expressed doubt as to how "objective and critical Knopf can be about Hillary when it's also publishing Bill." Knopf's editor said in response, "The editorial integrity of this (publishing) house speaks for itself. It's ludicrous for Little, Brown to suggest that. They should be very careful if they're going down that road." The Little, Brown editor said. "We [feel] confident we [can] go up against [Bernstein]", while the Knopf editor said that Little, Brown's "desire to link to our publication is understandable, especially since Bernstein will create a tidal wave of interest. They hope a rising tide raises all boats. But ... their book could drown in our wake."

== Release ==
A Woman in Charge was published while Clinton's 2008 presidential campaign was underway. According to reviewers at The Washington Post, the Clinton campaign was "nervous" about new revelations from this or the Gerth-Van Natta book. The Clintons had a less negative feeling about Bernstein's effort, given that they had a special antipathy towards Her Way due to Gerth's role in reporting the Whitewater scandal, the controversy of which had bedeviled them for much of the Bill Clinton administration. As for the Bernstein book's title, The Boston Globe wrote that "She's not in charge yet, of course, but perhaps the title is meant to suggest that she is a take-charge woman."

Once the books came out, while there were many items of interest, there were no blockbusters that would constitute political damage. A Clinton spokesman said, "Is it possible to be quoted yawning?" and that, "these books are nothing more than cash for rehash." Media Matters for America had no major objections to it compared to Her Way, aside from criticizing Bernstein on some grounds, such as falsely claiming during interviews for the book that he had revealed that Clinton had failed the D. C. Bar Exam, when in fact she had revealed it herself four years prior.

The general consensus was that while Gerth-Van Natta's book was somewhat negative towards its subject, A Woman in Charge was rather positive, notwithstanding that both were mainstream works. As The Washington Post wrote, "Unlike many harsh books about Clinton written by ideological enemies, the two new volumes come from long-established writers backed by major publishing houses and could be harder to dismiss."

== Critical reception ==
Many critics reviewed A Woman in Charge and Her Way in tandem. Reviews for A Woman in Charge were generally mixed-to-positive.

Reviewing the book for The New York Times, historian Robert Dallek asserted that the book presented "a [reasonably] balanced and convincing picture" of Clinton ... [but] also has its limitations. ... Bernstein includes too much recounting of familiar details about the Clintons' past." He concluded that the Bernstein work was more neutral than the more negatively framed Gerth-Van Natta account.

Professor Linda Colley of the London Review of Books said that the book was "well-written" and "considered", especially in contrast to Gerth-Van Natta's. Several reviewers noted that A Woman in Charge had next to nothing about Clinton's Senate career. The Rocky Mountain News wrote that "Carl Bernstein's much-hyped unauthorized biography of Hillary Rodham Clinton, A Woman in Charge, is neither a bomb nor a bombshell ... he disappoints [in] devoting about 20 pages to her years in the U.S. Senate and a scant three pages to her decision to run for president. It's as if he lost steam in his eight-year labor and then rushed to print as she became a presidential front-runner."

Elizabeth Kolbert of The New Yorker argued that Bernstein was trying to prove that Clinton is "really no worse than you think she is. ... Even as he chronicles one fabulous misstep after another, he describes the former First Lady as 'well-intentioned' and 'principled,' motivated by deep religious faith and a passionate sense of caring." Kolbert illustrated with a case in point, when in pointed contrast to Gerth-Van Natta, Bernstein writes that Whitewater was "overblown almost from the moment The New York Times first wrote about it."

== Commercial performance ==
Knopf had initially announced a first printing of 350,000 copies. As publication approached, this was revised to a print run of 275,000.

Despite considerable publicity, initial sales of A Woman in Charge were modest, with Nielsen BookScan reporting 25,000 copies sold in its first 13 days (about three times what the Gerth-Van Natta book was selling but far less than Clinton's 2003 autobiography Living History). It appeared on The New York Times Best Seller List for three weeks, debuting at #7 for the week of June 24, falling to #13 the next week, and spending its last week on the chart at #14 for July 8.

A CBS News end-of-year survey of publishing "hits and misses" included A Woman in Charge in the "miss" category and suggested that its total sales were in the range of 55,000–65,000 copies. Its sales fell far short of the initial printing and may have been impacted by the simultaneous release of Gerth-Van Natta's biography of Clinton.
