= Hillary's Choice =

1999 biography of Hillary Clinton by journalist Gail Sheehy

- Author: Gail Sheehy
- Language: English
- Subject: Hillary Rodham Clinton
- Genre: Biography
- Publisher: Random House
- Publication date: 1999
- Publication place: United States
- ISBN: 0375504699

Hillary's Choice is a 1999 biography of Hillary Rodham Clinton, who at the time of publication was First Lady of the United States, by journalist Gail Sheehy. Sheehy revealed much new detail regarding Clinton's girlhood and college days; her desire to balance family and career, and her tempestuous but tenacious personal relationship with her husband, President Bill Clinton.

== Critical reception ==
The book was praised by The New York Observer, given a damning-with-faint-praise review in The New York Times Book Review and attacked in The New Yorker.

Howard Wolfson, press secretary for Clinton's U.S. Senate campaign, said that contrary to what the biography asserted, Clinton's father Hugh E. Rodham did attend her graduation from Wellesley College. In the paperback edition of Hillary’s Choice, Sheehy writes that she re-interviewed a dozen of Clinton's classmates, including former Wellesley president Ruth Adams. None remembered seeing Hillary's father. Eleanor D. Acheson, one of Clinton's closest cohorts, said, "I never saw him in our whole four years at Wellesley.”

Some people quoted in the book said Sheehy represented their words inaccurately or changed the meaning of their words by taking them out of context:

- Garry Wills said he had described Clinton with the words "as charming as ever", but Sheehy changed that to "as Hillary as ever". Sheehy disputes that.
- Betsey Wright told The New York Observer that Sheehy took quotes out of context. In response, Sheehy offered to make the Wright transcripts available to journalists.
- Tony Podesta said that, contrary to what the book says in a footnote, he was never interviewed for the book by Sheehy. Sheehy later said one of her researchers interviewed Podesta.

Sheehy blamed some of the criticism of her book on the "Clinton attack machine". Ben Smith, in his Politico blog, observed that some of Sheehy's scoops on Clinton had been picked up by other journalists and used in their work. Smith wrote that "almost everything attempting to take a personal look at Hillary seems to go back to Sheehy ... [I]t may not be your sort of book but, for all its flaws, it does seem to be holding up."

Carl Bernstein, in his 2007 biography A Woman in Charge: The Life of Hillary Rodham Clinton, supposedly relied on some of Sheehy's reporting (on her interview with Clinton's mother and on some letters she sent to an old high school friend while in college). A front-page story in The New York Times on Sunday, July 29, 2007, was based on the same letters.
