= Nichola Gutgold =

American scholar and academic (born 1964)

- Born: 1964 (age 61–62)

Academic background
- Education: King's College (Pennsylvania); Bloomsburg University; Penn State University

Academic work
- Discipline: Communication studies
- Sub-discipline: rhetoric of women
- Institutions: Penn State University

Nichola D. Gutgold (born 1964) is an American scholar and academic. She is the former associate dean of academics of the Schreyer Honors College, Penn State University and is a professor of communication arts and sciences. Previously she was an associate professor of communication arts and sciences at Penn State Lehigh Valley. Gutgold's specialization is the rhetoric of women in non-traditional fields and she is author of a number of books, scholarly articles, chapters and is a frequent speaker.

After an undergraduate education at King's College (Pennsylvania), she received an M.A. in speech communication at Bloomsburg University and a Ph.D. also in speech communication at Penn State University. Her research has appeared in many news outlets including the NY Times, San Francisco Chronicle, LA Times, NPR, PBS.

She helps children overcome obstacles through her children's books, including Madam President: Five Women Who Paved The Way (Eifrig, 2015).

== Books ==
- Elizabeth Hanford Dole: speaking from the heart. Greenwood: 2004, (co-author, Molly Wertheimer)
- Paving the Way for Madam President. Lexington: 2006
- Seen and Heard: The Women of Television News. Lexington: 2008
- Almost Madam President: Why Hillary Clinton 'won' in 2008. Lexington: 2009
- Gender and the American Presidency: Nine Presidential Women and the Barriers They Faced. Lexington: 2012
- The Rhetoric of Supreme Court Women. Lexington: 2012
- Women in the academy: Learning from our Diverse Career Pathways Lexington 2012
- Grandfamilies: The Greatest Gift of All

Eifrig: Publishing 2016 (co-author Brittany Avent) Still Paving the Way for Madam President Lexington: 2017
