= Barbara Burrell =

American political scientist

Barbara C. Burrell
- Education: University of Michigan
- Awards: Outstanding Professional Achievement Award, Midwest Women's Caucus for Political Science
- Scientific career
- Fields: Political science
- Workplaces: University of Wisconsin; Northern Illinois University

Barbara C. Burrell is an American political scientist. She is a professor emerita in the Department of Political Science at Northern Illinois University. Burrell specializes in women and politics, campaigns and elections, and public opinion. She was one of the first researchers to use public opinion data to systematically study why the number of women elected to the United States Congress remained small through the beginning of the 21st century, and to examine the experiences of women who ran for public office in the United States.

== Education and positions ==
Burrell studied political science at the University of Michigan, where she obtained a PhD. She worked as a professor at the University of Wisconsin through the late 1990s. She was Head of Survey Design and Analysis for the Wisconsin Survey Research Lab at the University of Wisconsin–Extension, and was also affiliated with the Women's Study Center at the University of Wisconsin. Burrell then became a professor in the Department of Political Science at Northern Illinois University, where she remained until her retirement. At Northern Illinois University, Burrell was also a Faculty Associate in the Women's Studies Program. She also chaired the President's Commission on the Status of Women at Northern Illinois University, and in 2008 she was the president of the Women's Caucus for Political Science.

== Research ==
In 1994, Burrell published A woman's place is in the House: Campaigning for Congress in the feminist era. In A woman's place is in the house, Burrell attempted to explain why there were still so few women elected to the United States House of Representatives by 1994, by examining the experiences of women running for a seat in the U.S. House between 1968 and 1992. The book is structured around each step in the process of campaigning for a seat, from the decision to enter a party primary to what women do when they successfully reach the House, and Burrell finds evidence counter to several of the then-prevailing ideas about what limited women from entering Congress. For example, she argues that a majority of voters are not openly biased against women candidates; that women do not perform much worse than men in open primary elections; and that women are not worse than men at raising funds, which were all counter to the conventional wisdom at the time of publication. In the decades after its publication, A woman's place is in the House has been described as a classic work in the study of women running for Congress.

Three years later, in 1997, Burrell wrote Public Opinion, the First Ladyship and Hillary Rodham Clinton. In this work Burrell uses public opinion data to study how the public response to Hillary Clinton might affect the rapidly changing role of the First Lady of the United States. Burrell argues that Hillary Clinton's leadership of a major public policy initiative for her husband's presidential administration put her in the position of persuading the public that the role of First Lady can a political and policy role. Using survey data, Burrell presents evidence that Hillary Clinton was an electoral asset to her husband, with Clinton's support featuring significant racial and gender gaps among both Democrats and Republicans; Burrell concluded that it is possible for a First Lady to adopt a policy agenda, but that in order to maintain public support she must also perform the traditional parts of the job, such as being a hostess at the White House, and that to involve herself in a policy agenda has attendant risks.

In 2014, Burrell updated her analysis from A woman's place is in the House with the book Gender in Campaigns for the US House of Representatives. She extended the findings in her 1994 book to include races between 1994 and 2010, with a discussion of the 2012 election as well. Burrell argued in Gender in Campaigns for the US House of Representatives that her conclusions from decades earlier held up, and the conventional wisdom substantially underestimated how successful women candidates for Congress were. Further, she found that gendered effects on candidates' success had significantly diminished over time, and indeed that the styles and success rates of women as congressional candidates had become very similar to those of men.

In addition to these books, and to numerous journal articles, Burrell has also written reference and textbooks. She was the author of Women and political participation: A reference handbook (2004), and the textbook Women and politics: A quest for political equality in an age of economic inequality (2017).

In 2012, Burrell won the Outstanding Professional Achievement Award from the Midwest Women's Caucus for Political Science of the American Political Science Association.

== Selected works ==
- "Women's and Men's Campaigns for the US House of Representatives, 1972-1982 a Finance Gap?", American Politics Quarterly (1985)
- A Woman's Place is in the House: Campaigning for Congress in the Feminist Era (1994)
- Public Opinion, the First Ladyship and Hillary Rodham Clinton (1997)
- Gender in Campaigns for the US House of Representatives (2014)
- Women and politics: A quest for political equality in an age of economic inequality (2017)

== Selected awards ==
- Outstanding Professional Achievement Award, Midwest Women's Caucus for Political Science (2012)
