= Roger Gould (psychiatrist) =

American psychiatrist

Roger Gould is an American writer, psychiatrist, psychoanalyst and authority on adult psychological development.

He received his medical degree from Northwestern University, where he was elected to Alpha Omega Alpha, the medical honors society.

Following his residency at UCLA, he became the head of community and outpatient psychiatry at the Neuropsychiatric Institute. At that time, he published a major research data-driven paper called "The Phases of Adult Life". Erik Erikson, a leading expert in this field, took an interest in Dr Gould's work and asked him to write a chapter in his final book.

After leaving UCLA, Dr Gould turned his focus to developing online software and collaborated with Dr. Ken Colby, an AI Turing prize winner.

Published studies by UCLA and Kaiser Permanente found that the software developed by Dr Gould, was as effective as one-on-one therapy. Subsequently, 140,000 people have safely used the program online and in medical settings. The digital therapy programs are now being converted into an AI delivery system for the general public.

The Smithsonian Institution has recognized Dr Gould as a pioneer in this field for his innovative work.

He has authored two books, "Tranformations" and "Shrink Yourself". His research was the basis for an international best-selling book on the life cycle called Passages, by Gail Sheehy.

Roger Gould's work has been featured on national television (ABC, CBS, FOX) and covered in Time Magazine and the New York Times. He has been recognized as an expert in adult development through his many papers and chapters in psychiatric textbooks. Dr Gould was also asked to help design the elaborate jury selection system, which was used in the Pentagon Papers Case.

Roger Gould lives between New York and Los Angeles. He is married to Bonnie Strauss, an Emmy Award winning correspondent.
