= Her Way (book) =

2007 biography of Hillary Clinton by Jeff Gerth and Don Van Natta Jr.

Her Way: The Hopes and Ambitions of Hillary Rodham Clinton
- Authors: Jeff Gerth; Don Van Natta Jr.
- Language: English
- Subject: Hillary Rodham Clinton
- Genre: Biography
- Publisher: Little, Brown and Company
- Publication date: June 8, 2007
- Publication place: United States
- Media type: Print
- Pages: 438

Her Way: The Hopes and Ambitions of Hillary Rodham Clinton is an investigative biography about United States Senator, and former First Lady of the United States, Hillary Rodham Clinton that was written by Jeff Gerth and Don Van Natta Jr. and published on June 8, 2007, by Little, Brown and Company.

== Background ==
The authors said they interviewed 500 people in connection with their research. Gerth maintained that some had to remain unnamed because they "feared retribution from Senator Clinton or her staff" otherwise.

The book came out at the same time as another mainstream biography, Carl Bernstein's A Woman in Charge: The Life of Hillary Rodham Clinton. The respective publishers moved up the release dates in the act of competition; the Bernstein one came out first by three days.

== Contents ==
The book is organised into 3 main parts. The first part focuses on Clinton's early life and her role as Bill Clinton's political companion. The second covers her transition into becoming the First Lady, and the third goes over her two presidential runs.

== Political impacts ==
The book was published during her 2008 presidential campaign. According to reviewers at The Washington Post, the Clinton campaign was "nervous" about new revelations from this or the Bernstein book. But the Clintons had a special antipathy towards Her Way due to the Gerth's role in the Whitewater, which had bedeviled them for much of the Bill Clinton administration.

Once the books came out, while there were many items of interest, there were no blockbusters that would constitute political damage. A Clinton spokesman said, "Is it possible to be quoted yawning?" and that, "these books are nothing more than cash for rehash." Media Matters for America questioned Jeff Gerth's status as an expert on the Clintons, writing that "among mainstream reporters, perhaps nobody during the 1990s got more things wrong about Hillary and Bill Clinton than Jeff Gerth."

The general consensus was that the Gerth-Van Natta book was a little on the negative side towards its subject while the Bernstein effort was a little on the positive side, but that both were mainstream works. As The Washington Post wrote, "Unlike many harsh books about Clinton written by ideological enemies, the two new volumes come from long-established writers backed by major publishing houses and could be harder to dismiss."

== Critical response ==
Many critics reviewed this and the Bernstein book in tandem.

Reviews for Her Way were generally mixed. Reviewing the book for The New York Times, historian Robert Dallek asserted, "The book is almost uniformly negative and overly focused on what [the authors] consider the Clintons' scandalous past and the darker aspects of Clinton's personality." He concluded that the Bernstein work was more neutral. (The unusually harsh review had been assigned to an outsider per normal Times practice when their staff were the authors.)

Professor Linda Colley of the London Review of Books said that the book's heavy use of unnamed sources was problematic but that the authors "offer sharp analyses of some of Hillary’s recent speeches and public statements." Several reviewers noted that Her Way had a detailed, lengthy account of Clinton's Senate career, an area where the Bernstein book was clearly lacking.

New Yorker writer Elizabeth Kolbert saw the authors struggling to come up with new negative material on their subject. Kolbert illustrated with a case in point: "Take the hitherto untold story of Lee Telega, a Cornell University extension employee who worked in Clinton’s Washington office for six months, guiding the new senator on agricultural policy. Gerth and Van Natta go to great lengths to prove that Clinton's office never filed the required paperwork for Telega. The result? Apparently, Senator Clinton is guilty of receiving unauthorized dairy-farming advice."

== Promotion and sales ==
Her Way had a first printing of 175,000 copies. It was promoted by an initial installment in the New York Times, but a second installment was scrubbed. The authors also conducted many media interviews. Attempting to capitalize on the Clintons' dislike of the authors, the book's promotional tagline was: "The Book She Doesn't Want You to Read".

Initial sales of the book were slow, with Nielsen BookScan reporting only 7,000 copies sold in its first ten days (about a third of what the Bernstein book was doing and far less than Clinton's 2003 autobiography Living History). It did not appear on the New York Times Best Seller List.

A CBS News end-of-year survey of publishing hits and misses included Her Way in the latter category and implied that its total sales were maybe around 20,000 copies.
