= James D. Boys =

British academic and media consultant

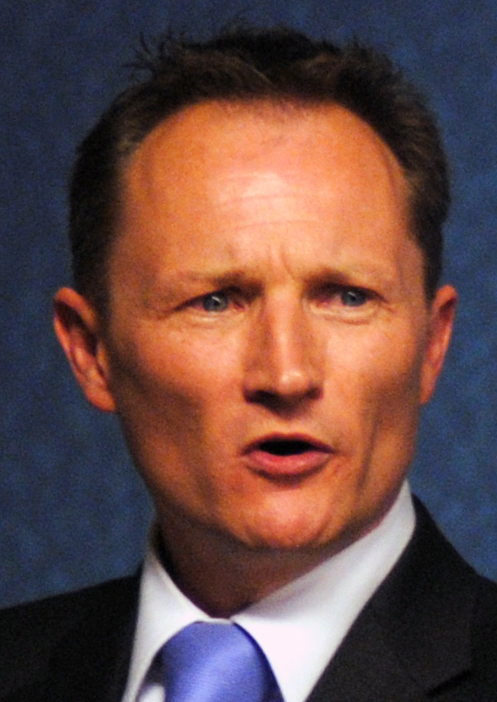
Boys in 2013

James D. Boys is a British academic and media consultant. He has written on aspects of American history and political life in the late 20th century, including an examination of the foreign policy of the Clinton administration (1993–2001).

== Career ==
- 2002–2006: visiting lecturer, Birmingham University
- 2004–2004: visiting lecturer, University of Gloucestershire
- 2005–2005: visiting lecturer, Leicester University
- 2006–2006: visiting lecturer, De Montfort University
- 2006–2011: consulting professor, Syracuse University
- 2006–2010: assistant professor of international political studies, Richmond, The American International University in London
- 2010–2011: visiting fellow, University of North Dakota
- from 2010: associate professor of international political studies, Richmond, The American International University in London
- from 2010: director, international relations postgraduate degree program, Richmond, The American International University in London
- from 2011: senior research fellow at the Global Policy Institute in London

== Publications ==
His publications include:

- James D. Boys, JFK: The Exceptional Ideal? in JFK: History, Memory, Legacy: An Interdisciplinary Inquiry, edited by John Williams, Robert G. Waite and Gregory Gordon, University of North Dakota Press, 2009
- ——— , Michael Keating, The Policy Brief: Building Practical Skills in International Relations and Political Science, in Politics, edited by Alasdair Young, October 2009
- ——— , Hind Zantout, E-Government: Big Brother of Athenian Democracy, in Proceedings of the IADIS International Conference e-society 2009: Volume II, edited by Piet Kommers and Pedro Isaías, Barcelona, Spain, 2009 pp 13–17. ISBN 978-972-8924-78-2
- ——— , Clinton's Grand Strategy: US Foreign Policy in a Post-Cold War World, London: Bloomsbury, 2015.
- "The Dual Containment of Rogue States". Nth Position Web site. April 2005. Archived from the original on 29 September 2010. An examination of the Clinton Administration efforts to deal with Iran and Iraq.
- "Clinton and Europe: The Transatlantic Relationship 1993-2001". The 49th Parallel Electronic Journal (Summer 2004). An examination of the Anglo-American relationship during the 1990s.
- "The Somali Legacy: Black Hawk Two". Nth Position Web Site. February 2004. Archived from the original on 26 November 2010. An examination of the Somali deployment and its impact upon the second Bush Administration.
