= Gail Sheehy =

American writer

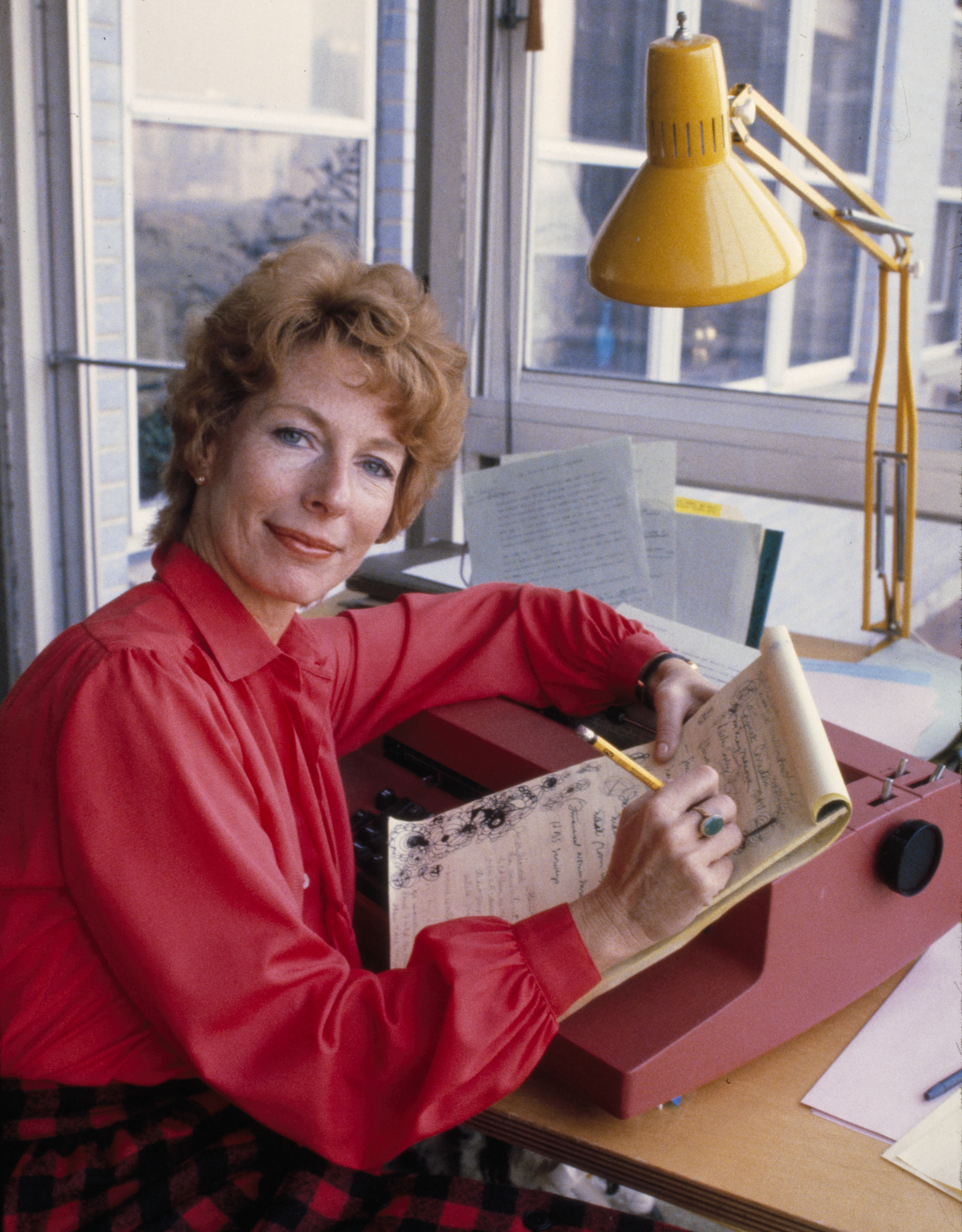
- Sheehy in 1981
- Born: Gail Henion; November 27, 1936; Mamaroneck, New York, U.S.
- Died: August 24, 2020 (aged 83); Southampton, New York, U.S.
- Education: University of Vermont (BA); Columbia University (MA)
- Occupations: Journalist, author
- Spouses: Albert Francis Sheehy (m. 1960; div. 1968) Clay Felker (m. 1984; died 2008)
- Writing career
- Notable work: Passages
- Movement: New Journalism
- Website: Official website

Gail Sheehy (born Gail Henion; November 27, 1936 – August 24, 2020) was an American author, journalist, and lecturer. She was the author of seventeen books and numerous high-profile articles for magazines such as New York and Vanity Fair. Sheehy played a part in the movement Tom Wolfe called the New Journalism, sometimes known as creative nonfiction, in which journalists and essayists experimented with adopting a variety of literary techniques such as scene setting, dialogue, status details to denote social class, and getting inside the story and sometimes reporting the thoughts of a central character.

Many of her books focus on cultural shifts, including Passages (1976), which was named one of the ten most influential books of our times by the Library of Congress. Sheehy penned biographies and character studies of major twentieth-century leaders, including Hillary Clinton, both presidents Bush, Prime Minister Margaret Thatcher, Egyptian President Anwar Sadat, and Soviet president Mikhail Gorbachev. Her final book, Daring: My Passages (2014), was a memoir.

Sheehy's article "The Secret of Grey Gardens", a cover story from the January 10, 1972, issue of New York, brought the bizarre bohemian life of Jacqueline Kennedy's aunt Edith Ewing Bouvier Beale and cousin Edith "Little Edie" Bouvier Beale to public attention. Their story was the basis for the film Grey Gardens and a Broadway musical of the same name.

== Early life and education ==
Gail Sheehy was born in Mamaroneck, New York, to Lillian Rainey Henion and Harold Merritt Henion. Her mother's family was Scots-Irish. Her grandmother, Agnes Rooney ran away from Northern Ireland to the United States as a mail-order bride. Another part of her mother's family was Scottish and worked the Ulster plantation for English landowners.

Growing up, Sheehy was close to her paternal grandmother, Gladys Latham Ovens. Ovens' husband had died of a stroke during the Great Depression—and after he died, Ovens went to work as a real estate agent in a career that lasted for over 40 years. Ovens bought Sheehy her first typewriter at age 7. When, as an adolescent, Sheehy began to sneak into New York City on Saturday mornings to explore, her grandmother kept her secret.

In 1958, Sheehy graduated from the University of Vermont with a Bachelor of Arts in English and home economics. She later returned to school in 1970, earning her Master of Arts in journalism from Columbia University, where she studied on a Rockefeller Foundation fellowship under the cultural anthropologist Margaret Mead.

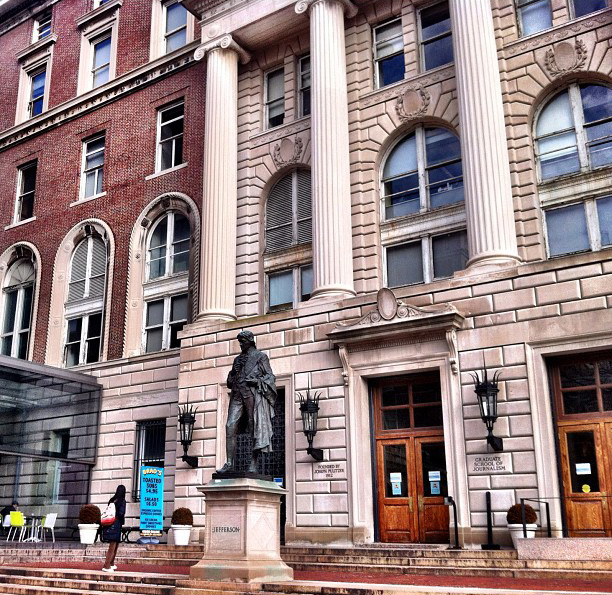
Graduate School of Journalism at Columbia University

== Career ==
=== 1960s ===
Sheehy's first job after college was working for the J. C. Penney department store chain. Sheehy traveled across the country putting on educational fashion shows for college home economics departments. It was here that Sheehy began writing professionally—she wrote for the company's magazines and worked with ad agencies to make informational filmstrips.

The next few years, a young married Sheehy supported her husband through medical school and began her work as a journalist. Sheehy moved to Rochester, New York, where she found a job as a journalist for the Democrat and Chronicle in 1961. She wrote for the women's page and for the Sunday feature section. Sheehy and her husband then moved to the East Village in New York City. Sheehy became a mother, but continued to work for various publications including the World Telegram for a brief time in 1963 and then the New York Herald Tribune from 1963 to 1966. Sheehy decided to leave her daily reporting job to become a freelance journalist. Sheehy and her husband divorced in 1968.

Sheehy participated in a number of important and significant cultural events in the 1960s including covering Robert F. Kennedy's campaign and Woodstock. Sheehy was one of the original contributors to New York magazine and contributed from 1968 through 1977. Clay Felker, founder of the magazine, and Sheehy's future husband, encouraged Sheehy to write "big" stories; one of the first was following Robert Kennedy on the campaign trail in 1968. She traveled with the campaign to the West Coast and had access to interview Kennedy directly. Sheehy was en route back to New York when Kennedy was assassinated in California. Sheehy covered the rise of amphetamine use in New York after her sister became addicted. Sheehy helped her sister get off drugs and they attended Woodstock in order to hide from her sister's drug pusher.

In 1969–70, Sheehy was awarded a Rockefeller Foundation fellowship to attend graduate school at Columbia University. While there, she studied under professor and anthropologist Margaret Mead who was then in her seventies. Inspired by Mead, Sheehy investigated cultural trends with articles on "The Fractured Family" in New York magazine. During a commencement speech given at the University of Vermont, Sheehy credited Mead with encouraging her to become a cultural interpreter: 'Whenever you hear about a great cultural phenomenon—a revolution, an assassination, a notorious trial, an attack on the country—drop everything. Get on a bus or train or plane and go there, stand at the edge of the abyss, and look down into it. You will see a culture turned inside out and revealed in a raw state."

=== 1970s ===
In the 1970s, Sheehy's portfolio of high profile articles grew and she began to author books. In addition to writing for New York magazine, she also wrote a monthly article for Cosmopolitan--her first story had her travel to India to meet Maharishi Mahesh Yogi and his disciples.

Several of Sheehy's articles for New York magazine were developed into books. This includes her novel Lovesounds (1970), Panthermania: The Clash of Black against Black in One American City (1971), and Hustling: Prostitution in Our Wide Open Society (1973). Lovesounds is a psychological novel that deals with the dissolution of a marriage based on her own first marriage. Her Random House editor, Nan Talese, suggested that Sheehy use a Rashomon-style for the novel, alternating the story between the wife and husband. Talese also loaned Sheehy the use of an apartment to write in.

In 1971, Sheehy wrote a series of articles on prostitution for New York magazine called the "Wide Open City." She used the New Journalism style which includes vivid description and narration for the article "Redpants and Sugarman." Sheehy later came under fire for fictionalizing a character which was a composite. Clay Felker accepted blame for taking out the paragraph describing the use of composites within the article. Sheehy's story was chronicled in the book Hustling and later made into an NBC 1975 television movie of the same name, starring Jill Clayburgh as Redpants and Lee Remick as the journalist. According to producer, George Pelecanos, Sheehy was the inspiration for a reporter character in the HBO series, The Deuce.

The summer of 1971, Sheehy and Felker rented a house in East Hampton. Sheehy and her daughter found an abandoned box of bunnies and since they could not take them back to New York, Sheehy's daughter suggested they take the kittens to the "witch house" across the street. It was there that Sheehy first encountered Little Edie Beale and her mother Big Edie Beale, the reclusive cousins of Jacqueline Kennedy Onassis living in a dilapidated 28 room mansion called Grey Gardens. Sheehy spent the next few weekends of that summer on the beach with Little Edie learning about their story. Sheehy profiled the two women in New York magazine in "The Secret of Grey Gardens". After the article was published, Onassis came forward with a check for $25,000 to help clean up the property. Little Edie and Big Edie were profiled in 1975 in the Grey Gardens documentary by the Maysles brothers.

Sheehy traveled to Northern Ireland in 1972 to report on the Irish women involved in the Irish civil rights movement. The British government had created the Special Powers Act that allowed British soldiers to round up Catholic men. The women and family members left behind became fierce fighters. She was next to a young boy right after a march, and as British soldiers moved in, the boy was struck in the face by a bullet. That day, January 30, 1972, became known as Bloody Sunday or the Bogside Massacre. Sheehy was trapped inside a Catholic ghetto which was under the authority of the IRA. She made her escape in a car over pastureland to Dublin. There Sheehy traveled to several safe houses and interviewed Rita O'Hare. The whole experience affected Sheehy deeply and on her return to the States she had a difficult time writing the story and developed a fear of airplanes which she later described as PTSD or posttraumatic stress syndrome.

It was at this time in the mid-seventies that Sheehy began work on her book, Passages. After conducting about forty interviews for a book on couples—Sheehy noticed a theme within her interviewees who were in their late thirties and early forties. The subjects expressed being unsettled. At this time, Sheehy began studying work by Elliott Jacques on mid-life crisis between the ages of thirty-five and forty as well as works by Erik Ericson on adult life stages. Sheehy coined the term "Second Adulthood" to describe the equilibrium that follows the crisis. It was during this time that Sheehy's long-time editor Hal Scharlatt died and the book was taken over by Jack Macrae, the publisher of Dutton. Sheehy was awarded a fellowship by the Alicia Patterson Foundation to allow her to finish the book. Sheehy's editor was concerned that the title would make readers think that it meant "excerpts," but Sheehy was confident they would understand the title once they read the book. Passages was published in 1976. Sales spread through word-of-mouth when it landed on The New York Times Best Seller List where it would remain for three years.

During this time period, Sheehy, as both a writer for New York magazine and Felker's partner, was a front-row witness to Rupert Murdoch's hostile takeover of Clay Felker's New York magazine. Felker was forced out of the magazine. Felker purchased Esquire magazine in 1978 and Sheehy wrote for the magazine including publishing a profile and interview with Anwar Sadat.

In 1977, Sheehy became an associate of the Women's Institute for Freedom of the Press (WIFP). WIFP is an American nonprofit publishing organization. The organization works to increase communication between women and connect the public with forms of women-based media.

Sheehy began work on her next book, Pathfinders, in 1978. The book examined the lives of those who had led lives that many would consider to have led full lives, and attained a sense of well-being. In developing the book, Sheehy worked with social psychologists at New York University to develop a Life History questionnaire which was given to many people, including "corporate chiefs, congressmen, men & women lawyer, etc." The questionnaire was also published in Redbook and Esquire magazines. Sheehy then conducted hundreds of phone interviews for the book, where she identified that those who attained well-being have a willingness to take risks and have experienced one or more important transitions in their adult years which they handled in an unusual, personal, or creative way.

=== 1980s ===
Sheehy began her work with Cambodian refugees in the early 1980s. Sheehy was invited by First Lady Rosalynn Carter to participate with other prominent Americans in a Cambodia Crisis Center. While visiting Thailand in 1981, Felker pointed out a story about a camp of Cambodian orphans which prompted Sheehy to visit the camp. It was at this camp that Sheehy met and later adopted her second daughter, Mohm. Sheehy also worked with Catherine O'Neill to publicize the plight of refugees through the Women's Refugee Commission. Sheehy and Mohm chronicled their journey in the 1986 book, Spirit of Survival.

Vanity Fair's editor, Tina Brown, invited Sheehy to write political profiles for the magazine beginning in 1984. Her first profile was of U.S. presidential candidate Gary Hart. Sheehy followed this up with pieces on other presidential candidates including George H. W. Bush, Al Gore, Bob Dole and Jesse Jackson. These profiles also served as the basis for her 1988 book, Character: America's Search for Leadership.

Sheehy helped organize the Sag Harbor Initiative with William Pickens, Pat Pickens, and Walter Isaacson among others in 1987. The initiative was initially a three-day event put on by "liberal intellectuals and concerned citizens" who wanted Americans across the country to hold town meetings to discuss urgent social issues. Isaacson went on to be president and CEO of Aspen Ideas Festival.

=== 1990s ===
During the 1990s, Gail Sheehy published five books including Gorbachev: The Making of the Man Who Changed the World (1990), The Silent Passage (1992), New Passages (1995), Understanding Men's Passages (1998), and Hillary's Choice (1999).

In 1989, Tina Brown asked Sheehy to expand her character profiles for Vanity Fair to include international figures. Sheehy researched and interviewed both Margaret Thatcher and Mikhail Gorbachev. Her article on Thatcher was published as "The Blooming of Margaret Thatcher" in 1989. Her profile of Gorbachev made the February 1990 Vanity Fair cover as "Red Star: The Man Who Changed the World". Sheehy expanded her research on Gorbachev, and published the book The Man Who Changed the World: The Lives of Mikhail S. Gorbachev just as he won the Nobel Peace Prize and a few short months before he was deposed. Charmed by the relationship between Gorbachev and Thatcher, Sheehy also wrote a play based on a fantasy romance called Maggie and Misha. The play was produced as a two-week workshop production off-Broadway.

Sheehy published the book The Silent Passage about menopause in 1992. Sheehy noticed that no one was talking about menopause and she, herself, was beginning to experience it. After a June 1992 appearance on The Oprah Winfrey Show, the book went back for a number of reprints and eventually hit the #1 spot on the New York Times bestseller list. Sheehy received a million-dollar advance from Simon & Schuster for the paperback rights.

Sheehy and Felker moved to the Bay Area of California in 1994 where Felker taught and founded the Felker Magazine Center at the University of California, Berkeley.

Sheehy profiled Hillary Clinton a total of three times for the pages of Vanity Fair in the 1990s, beginning with her time as First Lady and through her run for the New York Senate. The articles and work culminated in the publication of the biography, Hillary's Choice.

=== 2000s and 2010s ===
Despite caring for Felker as he was suffering from cancer, Sheehy continued to write and publish through the 21st century. In 2006, she published Sex and the Seasoned Woman in which she interviewed "over 400 women from the ages of 23 through 98." She published an article with Parade magazine, "Who Cares for the Caregiver?" After Felker's death in 2008, Sheehy was named AARP's Caregiving Ambassador in 2008 and began working with the AARP on a series of articles, interviews of caregivers through video, and blog posts. She eventually wrote a book on the subject of caregiving, Passages in Caregiving: Turning Chaos into Confidence which was published in 2010. She also wrote a play, Chasing the Tiger, about her relationship with Felker.

Sheehy published her own memoir in 2014, Daring: My Passages. In 2019, she was an Audio Podcast Fellow at Stony Brook University, where she created and produced her podcast series Kid Rebels with Gail Sheehy.

== Personal life ==
In 1960, Sheehy married Albert Francis Sheehy, a medical student at the University of Rochester. They had one daughter, Maura, and divorced in 1968. In 1984, Sheehy married editor Clay Felker, with whom she adopted a Cambodian child, Mohm. Felker died in 2008.

Sheehy died in Southampton, New York, on August 24, 2020, from complications of pneumonia at age 83.

== Selected articles ==
=== 1969: "Speed City: The Explosion of Amphetamines", New York magazine ===
Sheehy wrote the cover story for New York magazine about the growing problem of amphetamine use among young people in East Village. The article arose out of Sheehy's own experience—her sister had become addicted to the drug. The cover for the story was created by Milton Glaser of a snake writhing out of a drug capsule.

=== 1971: "Redpants and Sugarman", New York magazine ===
Sheehy gained notoriety in 1971, after New York magazine published a series she wrote about prostitution called "Wide Open City". Part 2 is called "Redpants and Sugarman". Sheehy told The Washington Post that she had created a "composite character" for "Redpants" in order to trace the full life cycle of a streetwalker, but the explanation was edited out of the story.

=== 1989: "The Blooming of Margaret Thatcher", Vanity Fair ===
In June 1989, Sheehy published a profile on Margaret Thatcher in Vanity Fair, quoting French President François Mitterrand's description of Thatcher as having "eyes like Caligula and the mouth of Marilyn Monroe." In her profile, she describes Thatcher as a leader surrounded by yes-men, who had nobody " left to tell her when she goes too far." To prepare for the interview, Sheehy tracked down Thatcher's "special Indian guru woman," to whose electric bath routine Thatcher attributed her youthful appearance. Sheehy described her difficulties with the interviewing process in the HuffPost, saying that she had "done a lot of things for getting a story, but maybe electrocution is going a little far."

=== 1992: "What Hillary Wants", Vanity Fair ===
Sheehy's 1992 article on Hillary Clinton created a stir by quoting her mentioning rumors of an affair between President George H. W. Bush and a woman named "Jennifer". Sheehy reported that Clinton complained that the media had made much about Gennifer Flowers' affair with Bill Clinton but did not look into the Bush transgression. Clinton considered that portion of the interview off the record, but Sheehy disagreed, and independently confirmed the "private conversation" Hillary had described by interviewing Hillary's confidante, Atlanta Journal & Constitution owner Anne Cox Chambers, who repeated the conversation word for word.

Fact checkers for Vanity Fair alerted editor Tina Brown to a potential problem, based on their review of the transcript of the interview, but Brown declined to remove the quote. The interview received wide coverage in the press.

=== 1995: "The Inner Quest of Newt Gingrich", Vanity Fair ===
Sheehy learned the back story of Newt Gingrich's life from his mother, who revealed that she was a lifelong manic-depressive. Kit Gingrich's first husband abandoned young Newt to a stepfather in exchange for forgiveness of a few months of child-support payments. "Isn't it awful, a man willing to sell off his own son?" Kit Gingrich told Sheehy. Speaker of the House Gingrich told Sheehy that both his fathers were totalitarian and modeled "a very male kind of toughness". He did not blink when Sheehy asked him if he thought he had a genetic predisposition to bipolar disorder. He said he did not know, then applauded the special powers of leaders who are thought to have been bipolar. "Churchill had what he called his 'black dog'. Lincoln had long periods of depression." He speculated that leaders who are able to think on several levels at once may have a different biochemical makeup. "You have to have a genetic toughness just to take the beating" he told Sheehy. Her article also revealed that his wife at the time, Marianne Gingrich, did not want him to become president and threatened to make a revelation that would torpedo his 1995 presidential campaign.

=== 2000: "The Accidental Candidate: George W. Bush", Vanity Fair ===
Sheehy found a possible source of the malapropisms for which Governor Bush was mocked: a history of dyslexia in the Bush family. Diagnostic experts told her that "The errors you've heard Governor Bush make are consistent with dyslexia," and that "a language-disordered person cannot take in a lot of information at once." Sheehy predicted that if Bush became president, "he would have to develop a work-style where others pre-organized and pre-digested information for him." Karl Rove and Dick Cheney, she suggested, organized much of the candidate's speeches and decisions.

=== 2008: "Hillaryland at War", Vanity Fair ===
Published June 30, 2008: Hillary Clinton's campaign had it all: near-death moments, hard-won triumphs, dysfunctional relationships—and a staff consumed with infighting over how to sell their candidate. It was a battle that revealed why she came so close to victory, as well as why she did not make it.

=== Professional affiliations ===
In 2009 Sheehy was named AARP's Caregiver Ambassador. In 2011 she became a chairwoman for the National Osteoporosis Foundation's "Generations of Strength" campaign.

=== Television and other media appearances ===
Sheehy was a frequent guest on NBC's The Today Show, MSNBC's Hardball and What Now? with Andrea Mitchell, ABC's World News Tonight with Diane Sawyer, Good Morning America, Oprah, CBS Sunday Morning, CNN, Larry King Live, Fox News, The O'Reilly Factor, and documentaries such as PBS's "American Experience: Clinton".

In July 2015, Sheehy appeared for an interview on Huffpost Live to discuss her 2014 work, Daring.

=== Plagiarism lawsuit ===
Sheehy's book Passages was a national bestseller. In 1975, Roger Gould, then a psychiatrist at the University of California at Los Angeles, brought a suit, which was settled out of court, against Sheehy intended to enjoin publication of her book, which had not yet been completed. Sheehy ended up giving Dr. Gould ten percent of the royalties for the book.

=== Awards and recognition ===
- Seven-time recipient of New York Newswomen's Club Front Page Award for Distinguished Journalism
- Washington Journalism Review Award for Best Magazine Writer in America
- New York Public Library Literary Lions Award
- 1973 National Magazine Award for Report Excellence
- 1975 Penney-Missouri Award
- 1987 Anisfield-Wolf Book Award for The Spirit of Survival
- 1994 Honorary Doctorate of Humane Letters from Dartmouth
- 1997 Hospital for Special Surgery Award For Groundbreaking Work in Women's Health
- 2002 American Psychological Association's Presidential Citation
- 2011 American Society on Aging Leadership Award

A Library of Congress survey named Passages one of the 10 most-influential books of our time.

== Bibliography ==
Non-fiction

- Speed is of the Essence (1971), ISBN 978-0-671-77283-3
- Panthermania:The Clash of Black Against Black in One American City (1971)
- Hustling: Prostitution in Our Wide Open Society (1973)
- Passages: Predictable Crises of Adult Life (1976)
- Pathfinders: Overcoming the Crises of Adult Life (1983)
- Spirit of Survival (1987)
- Character: America's Search for Leadership (1991)
- The Man Who Changed the World: The Lives of Mikhail S. Gorbachev (1991)
- The Silent Passage: Menopause (1993)
- New Passages: Mapping Your Life Across Time (1995)
- Understanding Men's Passages: Discovering the New Map of Men's Lives (1998), ISBN 0-6794-5273-7; Simon & Schuster Australia, 1998, ISBN 0-7318-0743-X
- Hillary's Choice (1999)
- Middletown, America: One Town's Passage from Trauma to Hope (2003)
- Sex and the Seasoned Woman: Pursuing the Passionate Life (2007)
- Passages in Caregiving: Turning Chaos into Confidence (2010)
- Daring: My Passages: A Memoir (2014)

Novels

- Lovesounds (1970), OCLC 141097
