= Jeff Gerth =

American journalist

- Education: B.A. Northwestern University
- Occupation: Journalist

Jeff Gerth is an American investigative reporter. He spent several years at The New York Times, writing lengthy, probing stories. He won a Pulitzer Prize in 1999 for covering the transfer of American satellite-launch technology to China. He broke stories about the Whitewater controversy and the Chinese scientist Wen Ho Lee.

== Early life and education ==
Gerth attended Shaker Heights High School in Ohio in the 1960s, where he was a member of the Junior Council on World Affairs and captain of the golf team. He was a varsity golfer at Northwestern University where he received a degree in business administration.

== Career ==
Gerth began his career not in newspapers, but in the marketing department of Standard Oil of Ohio; he was assigned to write down license plate data of vehicles pulling in and out of gas stations to find out why drivers were choosing Standard Oil's rivals.

Gerth worked for the 1972 George McGovern presidential campaign, investigating some aspects of the Watergate scandal. Then he did some freelance journalism, including an exposé of the La Costa resort's ties to organized crime that ran in Penthouse. Gerth, and his co-author, Lowell Bergman, were sued, along with Penthouse, by the founders of the resort for more than half a billion dollars. Before trial, Gerth and Bergman both settled and apologized. Gerth also collaborated with Seymour Hersh of The New York Times, who recommended that the newspaper should hire him. Gerth joined the newspaper in 1976 and spent most of his career in their Washington, D.C. bureau.

In March 1992, Gerth revealed that beginning in 1978, while Bill Clinton was Arkansas attorney general, he and his wife Hillary were partners in an Ozark real estate deal with James B. McDougal. When Clinton was governor, McDougal controlled a bank and Madison Guaranty, a savings and loan. Gerth's stories raised the question of whether it was appropriate for a governor to be in business partnership with someone having immediate financial interests in an industry regulated by the state. Gerth's reporting was criticized by liberal columnist Gene Lyons for "not particularly fair or balanced stories that combine a prosecutorial bias and the art of tactical omission." Other criticisms centered on the unclear time line - it was difficult to pick out that Bill Clinton was attorney general, not governor, at the time the partnership was created, and that Jim McDougal did not own a business regulated by the state until passage of the Garn–St. Germain Depository Institutions Act in 1982, four years after creation of the partnership. (See The Hunting of the President, particularly the book.)

Gerth reported a controversial Sunday meeting between Clinton and his personal secretary, Betty Currie. At the meeting, according to Currie, Clinton asked her a number of sensitive questions, including whether she remembered his ever being alone with Monica Lewinsky.

From April to December 1998, Gerth and others at The New York Times covered, or uncovered, "the corporate sale of American technology to China, with U.S. government approval despite national security risks, prompting investigations and significant changes in policy". The 1999 Pulitzer Prize for National Reporting recognized The New York Times staff, and notably Jeff Gerth.

On March 6, 1999, Gerth alleged in his reporting that an unidentified Chinese American, later identified as Wen Ho Lee, stole secrets for U.S. nuclear bombs. A government official was quoted as saying the case was "going to be just as bad as the Rosenbergs". FBI investigators waved the story in front of Lee as they interrogated him. Judge James Aubrey Parker eventually dropped all charges against Lee, stating, "I sincerely apologize to you, Dr. Lee, for the unfair manner you were held in captivity", describing Lee's nine months in solitary confinement as having "embarrassed our nation and all of its citizens".

In 2004, Gerth was a visiting professor at Princeton University, where he taught an undergraduate seminar on investigative reporting. He left The New York Times in 2005, and joined the staff of ProPublica in February 2008.

With his former colleague at The New York Times, Don Van Natta, Jr., Gerth wrote an investigative biography about Senator Hillary Rodham Clinton entitled, Her Way: The Hopes and Ambitions of Hillary Rodham Clinton. It was published in June 2007 by Little, Brown and Company. Gerth and Van Natta were reportedly offered a $1 million advance.

His New York Times articles on Wen Ho Lee are mentioned in the play Yellow Face by David Henry Hwang. In Yellow Face, Gerth's character is only referred to as "Name Withheld on Advice of Counsel".

On January 30, 2023, Gerth published in the Columbia Journalism Review what his editor called an "encyclopedic look at one of the most consequential moments in American media history," the U.S. media's coverage of Trump's alleged role in the Russian interference in the 2016 United States elections. The four-part series was entitled "The press versus the president." After an introduction by Kyle Pope, Gerth's series was published. Some journalists pushed back against Gerth's assertions, among them David Corn, Joe Conason, Jonathan Chait, Rachel Maddow, Cathy Young, Dan Kennedy, and Duncan Campbell. Andrew Prokop mentioned Gerth's series and grouped him together with other journalists that he labeled "Trump-Russia revisionists" including Matt Taibbi and Glenn Greenwald.

Gerth appears in the 2025 documentary Cover-Up, speaking about his work with Seymour Hersh.

== Personal life ==
Gerth married at age thirty-nine and became a father a year later. His wife Janice O'Connell worked on the Foreign Relations Committee for Senator Christopher Dodd, who during the 1996 presidential campaign chaired the Democratic National Committee. Gerth recused himself from any campaign coverage.
