= Donnie Radcliffe =

American journalist and biographer

Donnie Radcliffe (July 13, 1929 – February 19, 2010) was a journalist for The Washington Post and a biographer who wrote biographies of First Ladies Barbara Bush and Hillary Clinton.

== Books ==
- Simply Barbara Bush: A Portrait of America's Candid First Lady. ISBN 0-446-36024-4
- Hillary Rodham Clinton: A First Lady for Our Time. ISBN 0-446-51766-6.
