= Crisis of Character =

2016 book by Gary J. Byrne

- Author: Gary J. Byrne with Grant M. Schmidt
- Language: English
- Subject: American government
- Genre: Tell-all
- Set in: Washington, D.C.
- Published: June 28, 2016
- Publisher: Center Street
- Publication place: United States
- Media type: Hardcover
- ISBN: 978-1-4555-6887-1

Crisis of Character: A White House Secret Service Officer Discloses His Firsthand Experience with Hillary, Bill, and How They Operate is a best-selling 2016 book by former United States Secret Service Uniformed Division officer Gary J. Byrne with Grant M. Schmidt that purports to describe President Bill Clinton and First Lady Hillary Rodham Clinton as they resided in the White House during portions of the 1993–2001 Clinton administration, alleging marital infidelities on his part and an imperious manner on hers. The book also portrays a volatile relationship between the First Couple.

== Publication ==
The book is published by Center Street, an imprint of Hachette Book Group. Part of its commercial success was due to strong support from conservative media. Advance excerpts were also published in newspapers such as the Boston Herald.

== Content and themes ==
In addressing current affairs, in particular making reference to the Hillary Clinton presidential campaign, 2016, in the context of which the book was published, Byrne concludes that from his experiences, Hillary Clinton "lacks the integrity and temperament to serve in the office". Like several other works published around this time, the book emphasizes Clinton's predilection towards repetitively foul language.

The work also includes some episodes from the author's career that took place during prior presidential administrations.

== Responses ==
The nonpartisan Association of Former Agents of the United States Secret Service denounced the book for making "security harder by eroding the trust between agents and the people they protect". Members of that Association also said that Byrne's job and role at that time would not have given him the level of access that many of the book's tales would be dependent upon. Former members of the Secret Service suspect that Byrne was, as paraphrased by a reporter, "working from office rumors that he's cinematically written himself into". Media Matters wrote that in places Byrnes' account in the book stood in contradiction to his sworn testimony before the Independent Counsel during the Lewinsky scandal in 1998.

An opposite stance was taken by the author, party of interest Donald Trump, and some in the conservative commentariat, who said that the mainstream media was deliberately ignoring the book. Byrne's publicist declaimed, "the Clintons always trash the messenger".

== Critical reception ==
A review in The Washington Times stated that the book contained surprisingly little about Hillary Clinton and that what it did relate often was second-hand; instead, the review continued, the book was most valuable as a memoir by the agent and for his insights into the job and his life.

== Commercial reception ==
The book rose to number two on the Amazon bestsellers list within a few days of its release.

Soon after publication, the book debuted atop the New York Times Non-Fiction best seller list, and stayed on top during its second through fifth weeks. In its sixth week on the list it fell a couple of notches from its perch, followed by a couple spots' fall more the week following. The next two weeks were spent at number seven, followed by a placement at number ten on its tenth week on the list, which was its final appearance on the official list.

The book also appeared as number one on the Publishers Weekly list.
