= Don Van Natta Jr. =

American journalist and writer (born 1964)

- Born: July 22, 1964 (age 62); Ridgewood, New Jersey
- Education: Boston University
- Occupations: Journalist, author, broadcaster
- Notable credit(s): "ESPN"; The New York Times; The Miami Herald; "Wonder Girl: The Magnificent Sporting Life of Babe Didrikson Zaharias"; Her Way: The Hopes and Ambitions of Hillary Rodham Clinton (with Jeff Gerth); First Off the Tee: Presidential Hackers, Duffers and Cheaters from Taft to Bush
- Spouse: Lizette Alvarez
- Children: 2 daughters
- Awards: Pulitzer Prize, Society of Professional Journalists’ “Fellow of the Society,” USGA Herbert Warren Wind Book Award

Don Van Natta Jr. (born July 22, 1964) is an American journalist, writer and broadcaster. He is an investigative reporter for ESPN, since January 2012, and the host and executive producer of “Backstory,” an ESPN docuseries. He previously worked for 16 years as an investigative correspondent at The New York Times, where he was a member of two teams that won Pulitzer Prizes.

== Life ==
At the Times, Van Natta was on a six-reporter team, led by Jeff Gerth, that won the 1999 Pulitzer Prize for National Reporting for a series of stories about American corporations that sold satellite technology with military value to China. He was one of nine reporters awarded the 2002 Pulitzer Prize for Explanatory Reporting, for work on Al Qaeda following the September 11 attacks.

Gerth and Van Natta wrote an investigative biography of Senator Hillary Rodham Clinton, entitled, Her Way: The Hopes and Ambitions of Hillary Rodham Clinton, published in June 2007 by Little, Brown and Company.

Van Natta was born in Ridgewood, New Jersey and graduated in 1982 from Don Bosco Preparatory High School in Ramsey, New Jersey. He is a 1986 graduate of Boston University, where he won the Scarlet Key, an award given to student leaders. At BU, he served for three semesters as the editor-in-chief of The Daily Free Press, an independent daily newspaper published by students. In 2000, Boston University's College of Communication presented Van Natta with its Distinguished Alumni Award. In 2005, Boston University honored Van Natta as one of its 22 alumni to have won the Pulitzer Prize.

At the Times, Van Natta was the first investigative correspondent in the newspaper's history to be posted overseas. He was based in the newspaper's London, England bureau for nearly three years, from January 2003 until September 2005. While at the Times, he has also covered the impeachment of Bill Clinton, the deadlocked 2000 election in Florida, campaign finance and the crash of TWA Flight 800. Since September 11, 2001, Van Natta has covered terrorism and "extraordinary rendition," the CIA program that kidnaps terrorism suspects abroad and sends them to third countries, where they are often tortured. In October 2005, Van Natta was one of three reporters to write a 5,800-word article about former Times reporter Judith Miller's 85 days in jail for refusing to testify before a grand jury led by special counsel Patrick Fitzgerald. The article focused in detail on the handling of her case by the Times publisher, Arthur Sulzberger Jr., and top editors at the Times, including executive editor Bill Keller.

Prior to joining the Times in July 1995, Van Natta worked for eight years at The Miami Herald, where he was a member of a team of reporters awarded the 1993 Pulitzer Prize for Public Service for coverage of Hurricane Andrew in August 1992. Van Natta was sent by Herald editors to cover the eye of the storm in Florida City in southern Dade County. He stayed in a Comfort Inn, which was destroyed by the 165 m.p.h. winds, and he nearly lost his life. His first-person account of surviving the storm was part of the Herald's Pulitzer winning entry. While at The Herald, he won numerous national, regional and state awards, including the American Bar Association's Silver Gavel and the Investigative Reporters & Editors Gold Medal for an eight-part series called "Crime and No Punishment," which revealed Miami had the highest rate of crime but the lowest rate of punishment in America.

In April 2003, Van Natta published his first book, First Off the Tee: Presidential Hackers, Duffers and Cheaters from Taft to Bush (Public Affairs, ISBN 1-58648-008-1). The non-fiction book about Presidential golf was a New York Times bestseller, and was also excerpted in the March 24, 2003 edition of Sports Illustrated, and was the cover story in the June 2003 edition of the Observer Sports Monthly in the United Kingdom. First Off the Tee was made into a documentary by the Times Discovery Channel, a show that featured interviews with Arnold Palmer and Gary Player. And the book was also named a Notable Non-Fiction Book by The New York Times and one of the best sports books of the year by Sports Illustrated.

Van Natta's latest book, Wonder Girl: The Magnificent Sporting Life of Babe Didrikson Zaharias, was published in 2011 by Little, Brown. The book was not a bestseller, but in 2012 the United States Golf Association awarded "Wonder Girl" the "Herbert Warren Wind Book Award" as the top golf book published in 2011.

On September 5, 2010, The New York Times published the results of a 6-month investigation led by Van Natta into alleged malpractice at the News of the World, a British newspaper owned by Rupert Murdoch's News Corporation. The News of the World dismissed the allegations as unsubstantiated and said "the investigation was tainted by a vested interest in the outcome". They also accused The New York Times of flawed reporting and of being motivated by commercial rivalry. In a letter to the Times' Public Editor Arthur Brisbane, The News of the World cited seven breaches of The New York Times' own ethical guidelines on accuracy, use of anonymous sources, bias, impartiality, honest treatment of competitors, reader benefit and conflict of interest. They also questioned the professional detachment of Van Natta, who they claimed had sent a Twitter message linking to a personal attack on News Corp owner Rupert Murdoch alongside a message which read: "The Last Great Newspaper War". In a blog post following publication of the News of the World story, media commentator Michael Wolff characterised Van Natta as a Times's "enforcer" and "insider, loyalist and gun". In his column, Brisbane broadly supported the Times' reporting but conceded that it relied heavily on anonymous sources and that presentation of the story and gratuitous references to Murdoch could leave room for suspicions of a "hidden agenda".

Van Natta is played by Joseph May in the 2025 ITV drama about the News International phone hacking scandal, The Hack.
