= Yale Law Review =

Yale Law Review may refer to:

- Yale Law Journal
- Yale Law & Policy Review
- Yale Review of Law and Social Action
