= Yale Review of Law and Social Action =

- Discipline: Law
- Language: English

Publication details
- History: 1970–1973
- Publisher: Yale University (United States)
- Frequency: Quarterly

Standard abbreviations
- Bluebook: Yale Rev. L. & Soc. Action
- ISO 4: Yale Rev. Law Soc. Action

Indexing
- OCLC no.: 1770280

The Yale Review of Law and Social Action was a student-edited quarterly that was published by Yale University from 1970 to 1973. Hillary Rodham served on its Board of Editors and was an associate editor while attending Yale Law School.
