= Frances Badger =

American painter and muralist

Frances Stewart Badger (22 August 1904 – 3 November 1997) was an American painter and muralist, and a prominent member of the Chicago, Illinois art scene during the 1930s and 1940s.

== Life ==
Badger was born in Kenilworth, Illinois, into a rich and prosperous family. Her summers as a child were spent in Northern Wisconsin. As well as attending Roycemore School in Evanston, from the age of six she attended junior art classes in Winnetka, run by the School of the Art Institute of Chicago (SAIC). After graduating from Roycemore she returned to SAIC to complete a degree in studio art in 1925. Her tutors at SAIC included muralist John W. Norton, and Dutch-born Matilda Vanderpoel, sister of John Vanderpoel, famed teacher at the Institute, with whom Badger became close friends. Badger spent several summers painting at Vanderpoel's residence in Gold Hill, Colorado, and the two women went on a study trip together to Europe in 1925. On her return she returned to Roycemore School to teach art, as well as setting up a studio at the Fine Arts Building in Chicago to develop sketches she had created while in Europe.

Her family lost their fortune during the Great Depression, and Badger therefore qualified for the Illinois Art Project, run by the Works Progress Administration. In this role she created murals for numerous public buildings, such as libraries and schools, in Chicago, Oak Park and Joliet, many with rural and family themes. She became a fixture on the Chicago art scene, featuring in 17 exhibitions at the Art Institute of Chicago between 1927 and 1943, as well as the Chicago Public Library and many art clubs and galleries in the area. She served as president of the Chicago Society of Artists in 1942, and shared a studio in Tree Studios with Rue Wintherbotham Shaw, president of the Arts Club of Chicago. In the 1940s, Badger returned to the SAIC to teach, alongside her friends Ethel Spears and Kathleen Blackshear. In 1949 she became a student again, graduating from the Art Institute in 1949 with a BFA, and continued painting until a few years before her death.

Badger married Paul Schofield in 1940, and they lived in North Shore, Chicago. She died in a nursing home in Northbrook in 1997. She was survived by a son, Shreve Badger Schofield.

== Art ==
Badger's mural work included Joliet Township High School (1928, 1930), the Audy Home in Chicago, Cook County Children's Hospital, the Hall of Science at the Century of Progress exhibition in 1933 and Stevenson playground in Oak Park. The Oak Park murals are kept today by the Oak Park Historical Society. Badger was not a prolific painter, and for this reason her paintings are not common now, though they can be found at the Illinois State Museum, Springfield, the Art Institute of Chicago, and the John Vanderpoel Collection in Chicago. Her most celebrated work was Celery Pickers, No. 1, exhibited at the 1941 Chicago and Vicinity Exhibition at the Art Institute of Chicago.

In 1948, a profile in the Chicago Tribune said of Badger that "nearly all her work reflects to some degree the passion for nature which she acquired among the pleasant surroundings of her early life and which now, in maturity, is more intense than ever before."
