= Tree Studio Building and Annexes =

- U.S. National Register of Historic Places
- Chicago Landmark
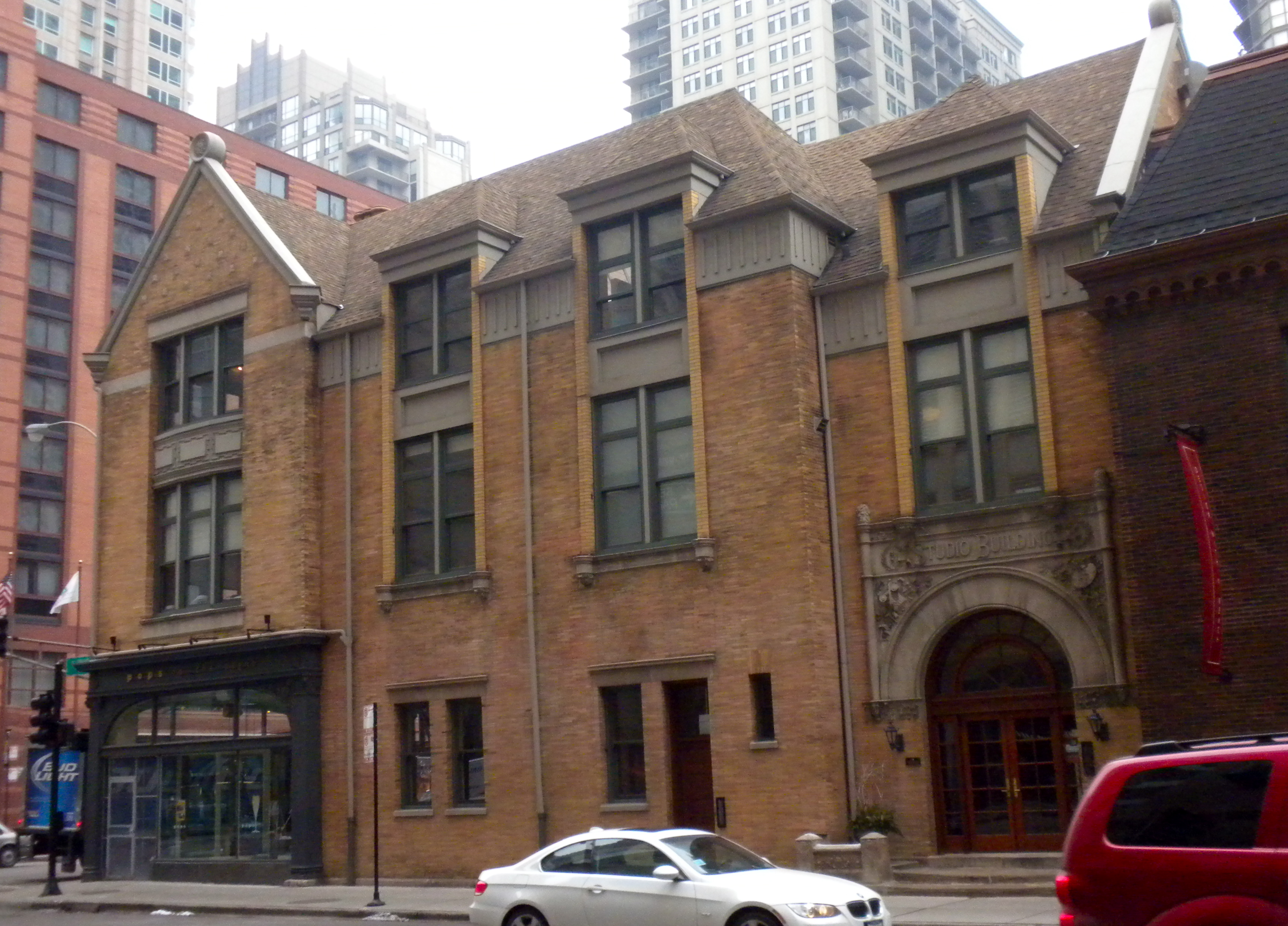
- Tree Studio Building and Annexes
- Location: 4 E. Ohio Street, Chicago, IL
- Coordinates: 41.89266°N 87.6276°W
- Built: 1894, annex: 1912-1913
- Architect: Parfitt Brothers, annex: Hill and Woltersdorf
- Architectural style: Queen Anne, annex: English Arts & Craft
- NRHP reference No.: 74000756

Significant dates
- Added to NRHP: December 16, 1974
- Designated CHICL: February 26, 1997; June 27, 2001

The Tree Studio Building and Annexes was an artist colony established in Chicago, Illinois in 1894 by Judge Lambert Tree and his wife, Anne Tree.

== Origin ==
Tree arranged to have the original Tree building constructed in 1894, designed by the architecture firm of Parfitt Brothers. The building is constructed with steel frames and is three stories high. The ground level is covered in a cast iron arcade and designed as storefronts, while the second story is covered in a Roman brick and is designed to serve as artist studios with large windows to allow natural light to enter.

Tree created a legal trust which stipulated that only artists could live in Tree Studios. This trust remained in force until 1959 when the complex was sold to the Medinah Temple, with which the studio complex shared a block.

== Notable artists ==
Some of the studio's residents have included sculptors Albin Polasek, his student John David Brcin, John Storrs, and Nancy Cox-McCormack; illustrator J. Allen St. John; muralists Frances Badger, John Warner Norton and Louis Grell; painters Scott Shellstrom, William Carr Olendorf, Ruth VanSickle Ford, Robert Wadsworth Grafton, Peter Diem, James Murray Haddow, Nancy Guzik, Richard Schmid, Antonin Sterba, James J. Ingwersen, John Doctoroff, Gus Likan, Richard Florsheim, Leopold Seyffert and Pauline Palmer, Carl Tolpo and Lily Tolpo; and actors Peter Falk and Burgess Meredith. Painter Indiana Gyberson was also a resident for some time, as was painter Anna Lynch.

== 2000 World Monuments Watch ==
The studios and temple were included in the 2000 World Monuments Watch by the World Monuments Fund, after citizens became concerned that the complex would be demolished and a high rise tower constructed in its place. With support from the financial services company American Express WMF awarded a grant toward the preparation of an architectural significance survey and a feasibility study for the site. The results of the significance survey led to the sites being designated as Chicago landmarks.

== Restoration and historic landmark ==
Restoration of the property was guided by Albert Friedman, who purchased the property in 2001, following which construction workers and artisans labored side-by-side, rebuilding Tree Studios by hand. Architectural details were re-created from surviving fragments in on-site woodworking shops.

The State Street building was listed as a Chicago Landmark on February 26, 1997. The Ohio Street and Ontario Street annexes and courtyard were added as Chicago Landmarks on June 27, 2001. The complex was listed on the National Register of Historic Places on December 16, 1974.

== See also ==
- Chicago architecture
