= Ethel Spears =

American painter

- Born: October 15, 1903; Chicago, Illinois
- Died: August 2, 1974 (aged 70); Navasota, Texas
- Known for: painter

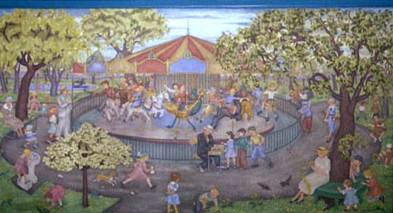
"Merry Go Round", a WPA mural by Spears in 1939 - in Rochelle, Illinois Library

Ethel Spears (1903–1974) was an American artist known for her humorous paintings of Depression-era urban life.

== Education ==
Ethel Spears was born in Chicago, Illinois, on October 5, 1903, and grew up in the Beverly area. After high school, she entered the School of the Art Institute of Chicago (SAIC), where she studied textiles and earned a certificate after completing a three-year program. Having already lost interest in textiles, she immediately re-enrolled in SAIC to study fine arts. Spears chose to study under the most avant-garde member of the faculty, muralist John W. Norton. With his mentorship, she won the opportunity to paint two murals in the SAIC tearoom.

Around 1925, Spears graduated from SAIC and decided to move to Woodstock, New York to study with the sculptor Alexander Archipenko. Nine months later she moved to New York City, where she stayed for some five years. She took classes at the Art Students League and New York University and supported herself with odd jobs.

Around 1929–30, she spent time in Paris, France, afterwards moving back to Chicago. Enrolling once more at SAIC, she earned her master's degree.

== Art and teaching ==
Spears became known for her cartoonish, droll watercolors of daily life in Chicago and New York: in streets and parks, on playgrounds and beaches, and inside schools and apartments. She also painted a few rural landscapes. Like some of Ilonka Karasz's New Yorker covers, the outdoor scenes often show a bird's eye view of people all going their separate ways. The critic C. J. Bulliet wrote that her canvases "are alive with tiny figures" who are "doing humorous things without knowing it." A master of composition, Spears packs her images with vivid and telling details. Her style has been compared to that of Peggy Bacon, though Spears's caricatures are less harsh. Spears worked mostly in watercolor, but also in oil and gouache.

Spears exhibited regularly throughout her life, mostly in Chicago and New York, at galleries and museums such as the Brooklyn Museum, the Whitney Museum of American Art, and the Corcoran Gallery. She was very active as a muralist, completing more than two dozen murals in the Chicago area alone, many of them through the Works Progress Administration. These included murals at the University of Illinois and at public buildings like schools and post offices; for example, she painted a mural of the Swedish botanist Carl Linnaeus at a school named for him. She was a member of the National Society of Mural Painters.

In 1937, Spears was hired as an art teacher at SAIC, and she continued to teach classes there for 24 years. She taught a range of subjects, including design, painting, and ceramics. She established SAIC's departments of enamelling and silkscreen printing and taught those courses as well.

=== Murals ===
The Flagg-Rochelle Public Library contains a mural, Merry Go Round by Ethel Spears, painted and installed in 1938. Murals were produced from 1934 to 1943 in the United States through the Section of Painting and Sculpture, later called the Section of Fine Arts, of the Treasury Department. The WPA was the largest and most ambitious American New Deal agency, employing individuals to carry out public works projects.

In 2019 several of Spears' WPA murals were removed from Chicago area middle schools because of concern that the subjects depicted are primarily white and do not match the diversity of the student body today.

By the late 1950s, Spears was suffering from an illness that may have been lead poisoning from her work with enamelling. With her life partner and fellow SAIC teacher Kathleen Blackshear, she retired to Blackshear's home town of Navasota, Texas.

Spears died August 2, 1974, in Navasota. Her papers and those of Blackshear are held by the Smithsonian Institution's Archives of American Art in Washington, D.C.
