= Macena Barton =

American painter

Macena Alberta Barton (August 7, 1901 – 1986) was an American painter.

Barton was a native of Union City, Michigan. She studied at the School of the Art Institute of Chicago from 1921 to 1925 while supporting herself as a bank clerk and proofreader. Among her instructors there was Leon Kroll, who encouraged her to study the work of the Post-Impressionists; other teachers included John W. Norton, Wellington Reynolds, and Allen Philbrick. She quickly won notice for her strong, striking surrealist paintings, and would go on to participate in exhibitions around Chicago throughout her career. In 1927 she received the August Peabody Award from the University of Chicago, and she won first prizes from the Chicago Galleries Association from 1945 to 1956. Barton was a Fellow of the International Institute of Arts and Letters, and belonged to both the Arts Club of Chicago and the Chicago Society of Artists during her career.

Barton was a committed feminist who once challenged art critic Clarence Joseph Bulliet's assertion, in print, that no woman had ever painted a nude of the highest caliber, and she has been claimed as the first American woman artist to paint a nude self-portrait. She later became a lover of the married Bulliet, with whom she frequently appeared in public. Her 1938 oil-on-canvas Loaves is owned by the Illinois State Museum. Woman Sewing, an oil dating between 1935 and 1942, was commissioned by the Works Progress Administration and is currently in the collection of the art gallery at Western Illinois University. A collection of her papers is in the Archives of American Art at the Smithsonian Institution.

== Exhibitions ==
- 1926: Art Institute of Chicago
- 1927: Art Institute of Chicago
- 1928: Art Institute of Chicago
- 1929: Art Institute of Chicago
- 1930: Art Institute of Chicago
- 1931: Art Institute of Chicago
- 1931: M. Knoedler & Company, Inc. Chicago
- 1932: Art Institute of Chicago
- 1933: Art Institute of Chicago
- 1934: Art Institute of Chicago
- 1936: Art Institute of Chicago
- 1938: Art Institute of Chicago
- 1939: Art Institute of Chicago
- 1940: Art Institute of Chicago
- 1941: Art Institute of Chicago
- 1942: Art Institute of Chicago
- 1943: Art Institute of Chicago
- 1944: Art Institute of Chicago
- 1949: Art Institute of Chicago
