= Kathleen Blackshear =

American artist

- Born: June 6, 1897; Navasota, Texas
- Died: October 14, 1988 (aged 91); Navasota, Texas
- Occupations: artist, teacher

Kathleen Blackshear (1897–1988) was an American Modernist artist known for her sensitive depictions of African-American subjects.

== Early life and education ==
Kathleen Blackshear was born June 6, 1897, near the Texas Cotton Belt in a city called Navasota, Texas. She was the only child of Edward Duncan Blackshear and May (Terrell) Blackshear. She spent much of her youth on cotton plantations owned by members of both her mother's and father's families near the town of Navasota. Her childhood friendships with the children of African-American field workers strongly influenced her later career.

Blackshear graduated from Navasota High School in 1914 and showed an aptitude for art at an early age. After graduating high school, she attended Baylor University, graduating with a bachelor's degree in modern languages in 1917, after which she went to New York to study at the Art Students League. Her teachers at the ASL included Solon Borglum, George Bridgman, and Frank Vincent DuMond. She left New York in 1918 and spent the next six years traveling around Texas, California, and Europe and taking odd jobs, including hand-coloring films and designing film posters in Los Angeles.

In 1924, Blackshear took up her art studies again, this time at the School of the Art Institute of Chicago (SAIC), where she studied with John Norton, Charles Fabens Kelley, William Owen, and art historian Helen Gardner who throughout her time at SAIC became a lifelong friend. She studied painting and graphic arts and later received her master's degree from SAIC in 1940.

== Teaching and illustration work ==
In 1926, Blackshear began teaching art history and studio courses at SAIC to help support herself and continued to do so until retiring in 1961. She was known for mentoring African-American artists, including Margaret Burroughs, and for introducing her students to African and Asian art through field trips to local collections.

While at SAIC, Blackshear supplied the analytical drawings for two of Helen Gardner's books, Art Through the Ages (1926)—one of the earliest American art history textbooks to incorporate non-Western art—and Understanding the Arts (1932). She also supplied illustrations for Katharine Kuh's Art Has Many Faces (1951).

Through their shared interest in non-Western art, Blackshear and Gardner have been credited with being key influences on the distinctive style of postwar Chicago artists.

== Art career ==
Influenced by various strains of Modernism including Post-Impressionism and Cubism, Blackshear developed a range of styles with bold, simplified forms and rhythmic or patterned elements often featuring strong diagonals and tilted planes. Her paintings are reminiscent of Regionalists such as Thomas Hart Benton and modernists like Fernand Léger, while her whimsical abstract drawings evoke Paul Klee.

During the height of her career, between 1924 and 1940, African Americans were the central subjects of her work, and she became known for depicting them with warmth and clarity but without sentimentality. In 1939, critic C. J. Bulliet called her "Chicago’s most sympathetic, most understanding painter of the American Negro."

Blackshear also made two dioramas for the 1933 Century of Progress Exposition in Chicago.

During her lifetime, Blackshear exhibited her work at regional museums such as the Dallas Museum of Fine Arts, the Houston Museum of Fine Arts, and the Delgado Museum of Art (New Orleans, LA). She had her first solo museum show in 1941 at the Witte Museum in San Antonio, TX.

== Personal life ==
Although she lived in Chicago, Blackshear kept a studio in Houston and often spent the summer in Navasota. Blackshear's life companion was the artist Ethel Spears, whom she probably met at SAIC and who died in 1974.

Blackshear died October 14, 1988, in Navasota.

== Legacy ==
Blackshear's work is in the collections of the Modern Art Museum (Fort Worth, TX), the Houston Museum of Fine Arts, the Art Institute of Chicago, and other institutions.

Blackshear was the subject of a 1990 retrospective at SAIC entitled "A Tribute to Kathleen Blackshear."

Her papers and those of Ethel Spears are held by the Smithsonian Institution's Archives of American Art in Washington, D.C.
