= Barbata (surname) =

Barbata is a surname. Notable people with the surname include:

- John Barbata (1945–2024), American drummer
- Laura Anderson Barbata (born 1958), Mexican artist

== See also ==
- Barbata, comune in Italy
- Venus Barbata
