= Tom Shannon (artist) =

American artist and inventor

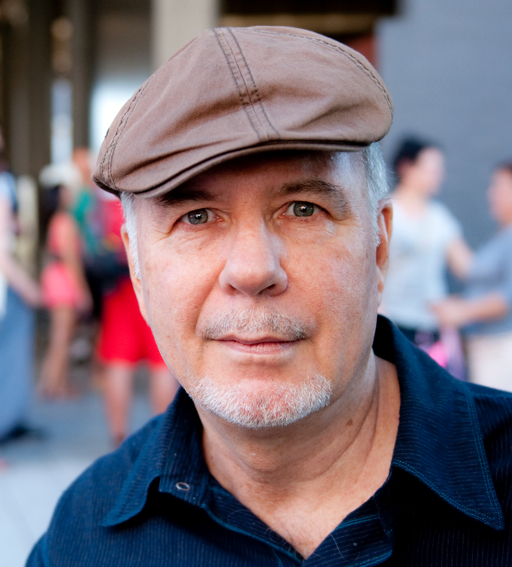
- Shannon, The Highline, 2012
- Born: June 23, 1947 (age 79); Kenosha, Wisconsin, U.S.
- Education: University of Wisconsin-Milwaukee; School of the Art Institute of Chicago
- Known for: Sculpture, painting, or drawing things that levitate or float
- Notable work: Squat (1966); Golden Ray (1976); Compass of Love (1981); Drop (2009); Mind Expansion (2016)
- Movement: Conceptualism, Minimalism, Installation Art
- Website: tomshannon.com

Tom Shannon (born June 23, 1947) is an American artist and inventor.

== Personal life and education ==
Tom Shannon was born in Kenosha, Wisconsin on June 23, 1947, to parents John Kingsley Shannon and Audrey Elizabeth Shannon. His father was an inventor and served as a Marine pilot during WWII. Shannon has two brothers, John and James. In 1966, he attended the University of Wisconsin - Milwaukee and received an MFA in 1971 from the School of the Art Institute of Chicago. On September 26, 1990, Shannon married Catherine Matisse Monnier, a great-granddaughter of Henri Matisse and granddaughter of Marcel Duchamp. Together, they have three children. Shannon currently resides in New York City.

== Career ==
Utilizing his father's battery manufacturing plant, 19 year old Shannon created Squat, 1966. An interactive robotic sculpture responsive to the sense of touch.

Squat won the Pauline Palmer Prize at the Art Institute of Chicago that year in a show juried by James Speyer and Walter Hopps. In 1969, Squat would be included in the landmark exhibition, The Machine as Seen at the End of the Mechanical Age at New York's Museum of Modern Art. It is considered a seminal work in robotic art.

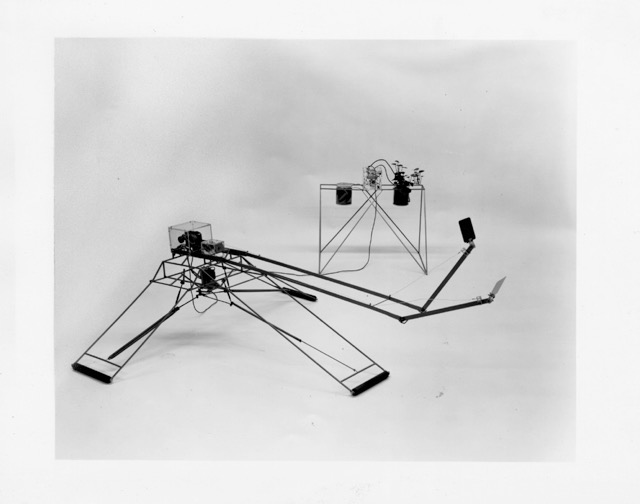
Tom Shannon, Squat, 1966.

Though science and technology highly influence Shannon's practice, his work profoundly reveals a deeper connection to hidden beauty within universal themes.

In the 1980s, exploring the forces of levitation became central to Shannon's work. By designing a system of permanent magnets Shannon's sculptures evoke a sense of weightlessness as seemingly heavy materials, such as metal and wood, effortlessly float above their base.

In 1981, Shannon created his first large scale levitation sculpture, Compass of Love. The seven-meter magnetic piece was acquired by The Musee d'Art Moderne de Paris after its inclusion in their 1983 exhibit titled, ALEA[S]. In addition, Compass of Love was included in the 1986 Venice Biennale.

With the participation of R. Buckminster Fuller and Shoji Sadao, Shannon patented and produced Synchronous World Clock, 1983 (edition of 20). Currently, both the Buckminster Fuller Institute and the Smithsonian American History Museum have Shannon's World Clock in their collection. Through the French Ministry of Culture, art collector and museum director Pontus Hulten commissioned Shannon to create a major work for Cité des Sciences et de l'Industrie (CSI) in Parc de la Villette, Paris. Shannon designed a 17-meter diameter spherical array of computer-controlled RGB LED nodes equidistantly spaced like atoms in a crystal titled, The Crystal Ball. In 1991, Shannon exhibited Compass Moon Atom Room, a room entirely filled with magnetic spheres aligned by Earth's magnetic field, at Moderna Museet in Stockholm.

In 2000, Shannon commissioned AeroVironment to perform a feasibility study for Air Genie Video Airship. Air Genie is a spherical helium airship whose entire surface is an LED video screen. By 2003 a US Patent was granted. In the same year, Shannon was a featured artist at the 2003 TED Conference where he presented Air Genie. Later in 2009, Shannon would again be invited to TED to show a series of paintings made by a remote-controlled pendulum.

Shannon was commissioned by the Grand Palais in Paris to make a movie of his Airlands project (aka Outlands) for a major millennial show covering ten thousand years titled,Visions of the Future.

Shannon's sculptures have been exhibited internationally at the Centre Pompidou, the Stedelijk Museum, Moderna Museet, the Venice Biennale, the São Paulo Biennial, the Biennale de Lyon, the Musee d'Art Moderne de Paris, Art Tower Mito and the Whitney Museum.

== Sculpture ==
Shannon's sculptures are conceptually driven covering a range of existential conditions. These conditions include, natural forces, properties, characteristics, proportions, web of sensations, and the knowledge of which we are connected. For example, Shannon's sculpture, Ray, 1986, exhibits the Sun and Earth in proportion with the cone of energy, gravity, electromagnetic, and luminosity which collectively connect the two spheres.

=== Magnetic Levitation ===
Shannon is credited with inventing and first publicly exhibiting a single-tether stabilization system for permanent magnetic levitation. His method was first shown in 1981 through his sculpture, Compass of Love at the Musee d’Art de la ville de Paris, France.

His series of levitating sculptures utilize his method of incorporating permanent magnets within his pieces. For example, New Romance, 1989, Shannon creates a wooden square frame accompanied by an elongated floating piece. This method has additionally been implemented in his "Array" works where a series of suspended magnetic spheres fill an entire room of three-dimensional crystalline arrangements. Like a compass, each sphere orients to the Earth's magnetic field while additionally interacting with one another.

=== Monumental Sculptures ===
His recent work includes large outdoor sculptures such as, Drop, 2009, which behave as weightless objects. The sculpture's internal mechanisms consist of axles, ball-bearings, universal joints, ball & sockets, fulcrums and massive counterweights. The sculpture's interior grant the ability to interact with Shannon's work allowing the pieces to spin, tilt, rise/fall and glide horizontally while eventually returning to equilibrium. In November 2019, the Science Museum Oklahoma, Oklahoma City, OK opened a year-long exhibition of new and older work by Shannon entitled, "Tom Shannon: Universe in the Mind | Mind in the Universe". In 2021, the museum installed Shannon's sculpture, Finity, located at their entrance. Composed of five rotating stainless steel shapes, the sculpture stands at 25-ft while interacting with both the outdoor elements along with visitor participation.

=== Designed Awards ===
Shannon also designed awards for the TED Prize, the Buckminster Fuller Challenge prize and the Trophee Jules Verne installed at the Musee de la Marine in Paris.

Works
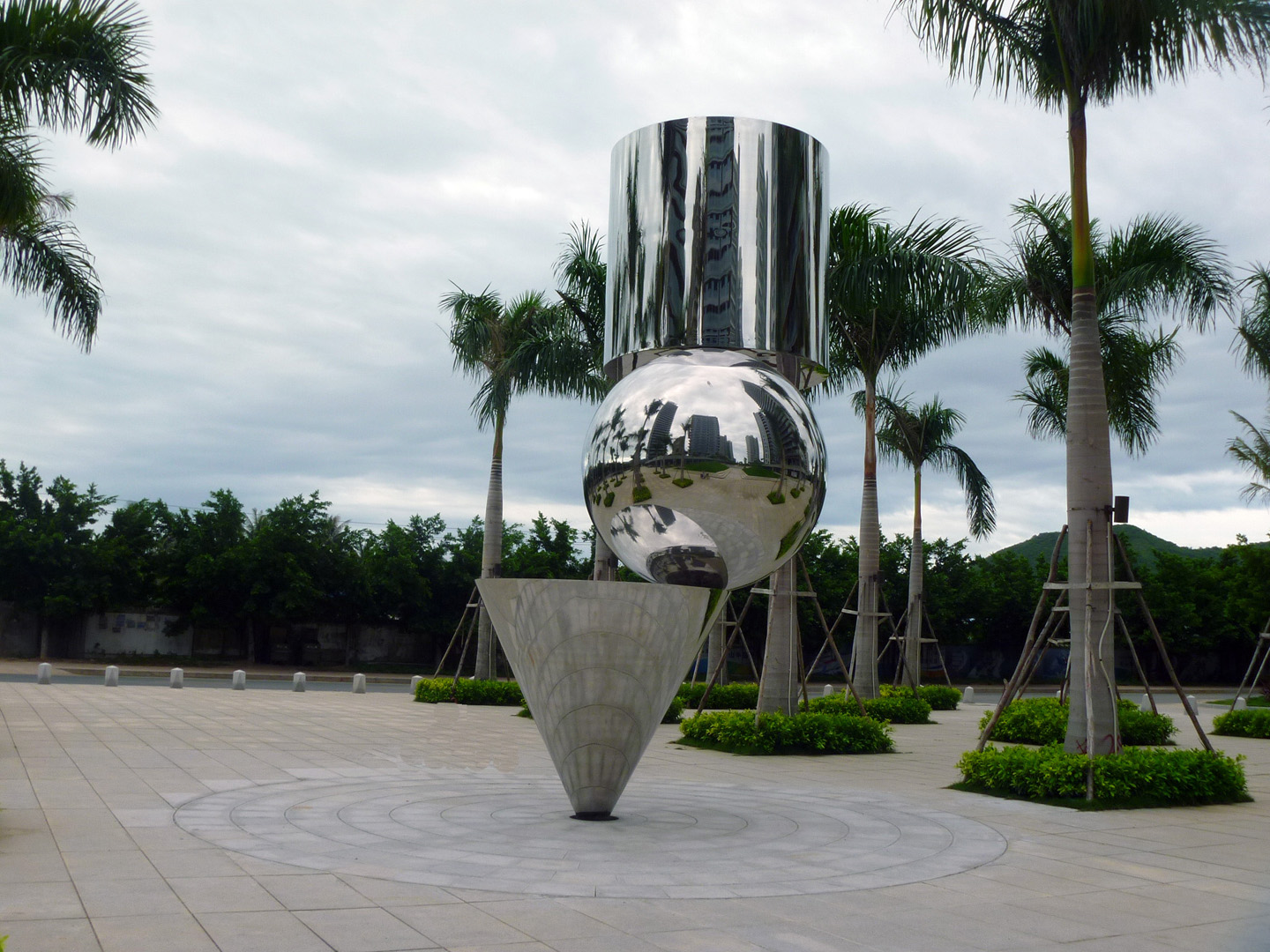
Shannon, Parallel Universe, Shanghai.
Installed in 2012.

== Paintings ==
Throughout his career, Shannon used several painting techniques. At first he used traditional brush and ink, watercolor, or oil to create paintings reflecting concepts of three-dimensional projects and their settings such as sculptures in a landscape.

In the 1970s, Shannon developed his "Evaporations" technique where aqueous paint was poured on a sheet of paper. Over time (a few days up to a month) the water would evaporate, leaving the pigment in dry "lakes" of color. An important concept in this painting technique is that the pigment is held in "suspension" as if the color particles were floating in fluid. For Shannon, this was microscopic levitation with a visual record of the pigment's "descent" onto a paper "ground". It was also for him, a way to co-author a painting with nature, a lesson learned from John Cage.

Another co-authoring with nature is Shannon's "Trajectory" series. Here, Shannon tosses rubber balls wet with paint on inclined canvases capturing the natural parabolic curve of the ball's path in gravity.

As early as 1976, Shannon invented a mechanical pendulum paint dispenser. Controlled by the artist, the pendulum dispenser suspends over a canvas while releasing paint in discrete drops; a process Shannon describes as a "marriage of chaos and control". Following a rotational or linear pathway, his "Pendulum Paintings" show various degrees of movement and images within its intricate layers.

In mid-2015, Shannon experimented with another painting format he calls "Aerial Painting". His Aerial works allow viewers to observe a two-dimensional pattern on a canvas, which optically becomes a three-dimensional image. This process is achieved without the use of red and green glasses or other mechanical aids. "Looking 'through' a painting is something you do naturally," said Shannon. "It's the same as gazing at a distant horizon. Your brain re-orders space on the canvas, creating a natural 3D space, where objects hover in front and behind the canvas." An example of this technique is the painting, Mind Expansion, 2016. For Shannon, this is another form of levitation, an often recurring theme.

Works

== Patents ==
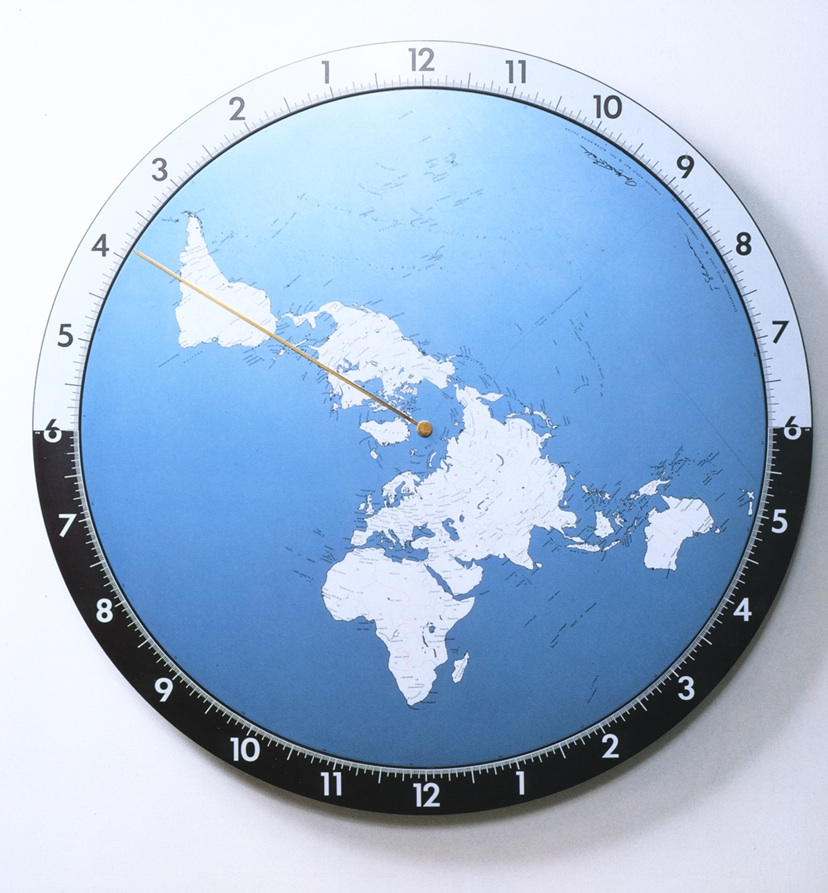
Synchronous World Clock (1974) Tom Shannon Studio Archive

Shannon holds patents for:

- first tactile telephone – U.S. patent 3,780,225 – Filed January 3, 1972
- a color television projector (w/ Walter De Maria, Maris Ambats) – U.S. patent 3,800,085 – Filed October 20, 1972
- a synchronous world clock U.S. patent 4,579,460 – Filed May 17, 1984 featuring a Fuller-Sadao map face, in the collection of the Smithsonian Institution
- double-reversible garments (w/ Caty Shannon)
- a Video Airship (Air Genie)[03]. U.S. patent 7,173,649 – Filed May 29, 2002

== Air Genie Video Airship ==
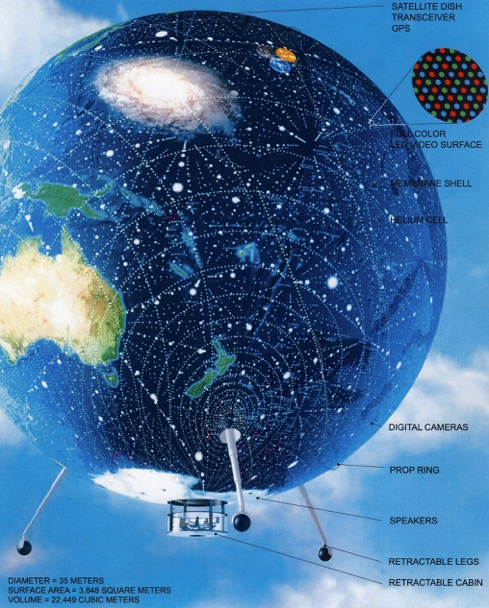
Tom Shannon, Air Genie

The Video Airship is an ongoing project which weaves together several themes in Shannon's work. In the late 60's Shannon proposed spherical televisions linked to orbiting camera satellites. Buckminster Fuller had earlier proposed a 200-ft sphere covered with lights to display Earth to the United Nations. Shannon designed a LED-covered spherical blimp with cameras that could land at school campuses and other public locations to deliver education and at night host rave dances. Aerovironment, Inc., the engineering firm founded by aeronautics legend Paul MacCready, found the design feasible; it can be aerodynamically controlled and can present clear computer video in daylight.
