= Former Roycemore School building =

School building in Evanston, Illinois

- Roycemore School
- U.S. National Register of Historic Places
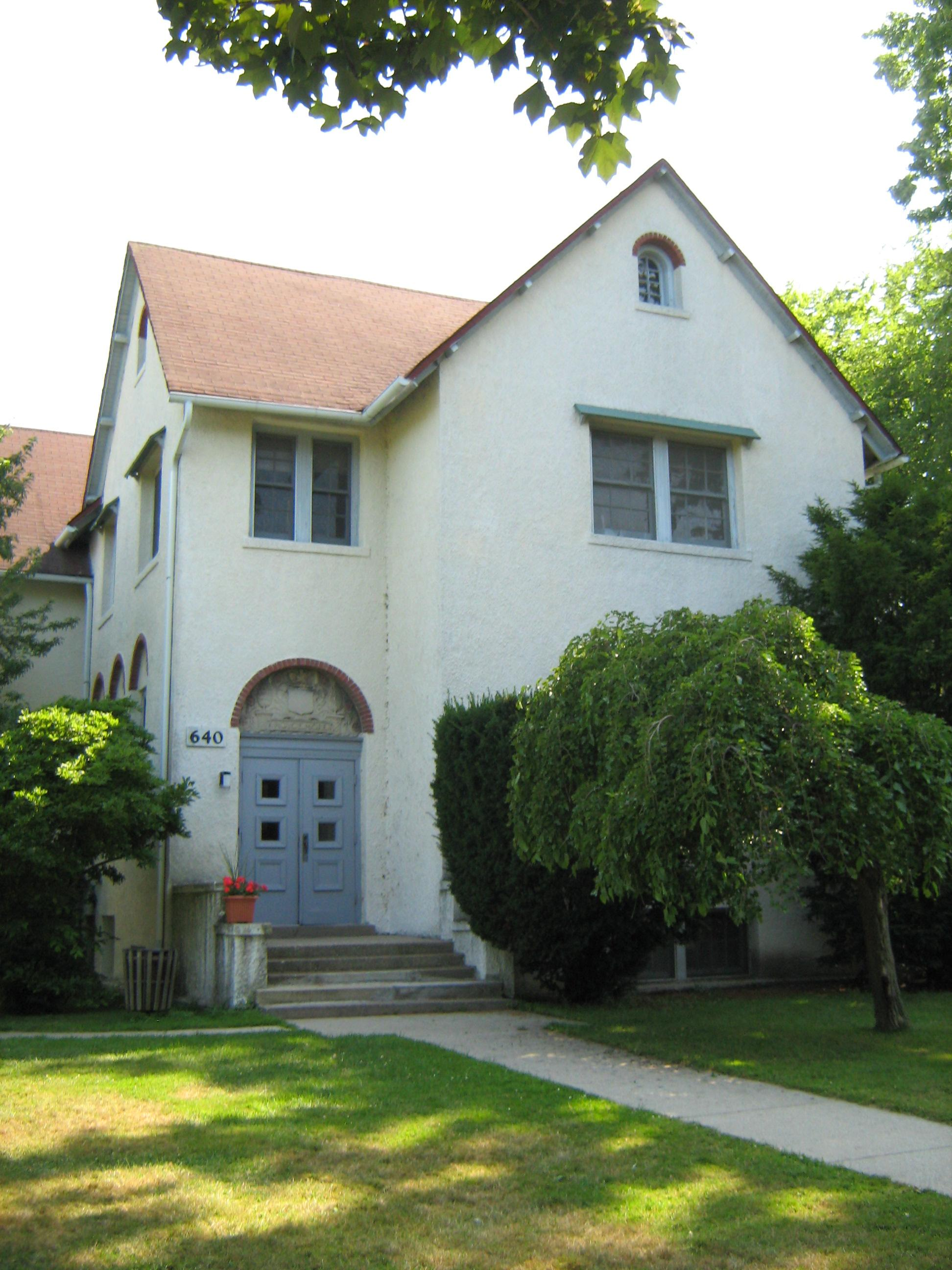

- Location within Illinois Location within the United States
- Location: 640 Lincoln Street, Evanston, Illinois
- Coordinates: 42°3′41″N 87°40′44″W
- Area: 3 acres (1.2 ha)
- Built: 1915
- Architect: Lawrence Buck; Tallmadge & Watson
- NRHP reference No.: 87001256
- Added to NRHP: August 3, 1987

The former Roycemore School building is a Northwestern University building in Evanston, Illinois, United States, that is included on the National Register of Historic Places. The structure had formerly housed the Roycemore School for nearly a century, from its 1915 opening until 2012.

== History ==
Roycemore School was founded in 1915 as an all-girls school. It became co-ed in 1962. The former Roycemore School building was placed on the National Register of Historic Places in 1987.

== Architectural Style ==
The National Register of Historic Places Nomination Form identifies the two architecture firms that were involved in the design and realization of Roycemore’s signature school buildings. It says that architect Lawrence Buck designed the buildings, with the firm of Talmadge & Watson involved as associated architects. Thomas Eddy Tallmadge is identified as the lead representative for his firm.

In discussing the style and importance of the buildings in Section 8 of the form, the NRHP nomination says;

“Roycemore School is of considerable architectural significance because it is one of only two examples known to exist in the Midwest of an educational building designed according to the principles evolved by such famous early modern architects in England as Charles Voysey and M. H. Baillie Scott. As such it eschews the accoutrements of the historic styles and emphasizes instead the stern virtues of simplicity of form and honesty of expression that gave sustenance to the English progressive movement from Pugin through Eastlake to Morris and Voysey....”

== Roycemore's Relocation ==
As its property lease with Northwestern University for the lot at Lincoln St. and Orrington Ave. was due to end in 2014, in early 2000 the school began looking for another Evanston location that would allow room to continue a trend of enrollment growth that had occurred over the previous 10 years, with updated technology and to accommodate a larger, regulation-sized, gymnasium. Roycemore began classes at 1200 Davis Street in Evanston on January 6, 2012 until the school ceased operations prior to the start of the 2026-2027 school year.

== Post-Roycemore Usage ==
Despite zoning that allows Northwestern to utilize the property as a dormitory, neighbors have voiced objections to the possibility. Dormitories are considered to be the least favorite potential reuse of the site amongst nearby residents. Also, despite the building having hosted classes for the near-century the Roycemore School was housed there, some neighbors also objected to the idea of Northwestern utilizing the site for university classes. Many neighbors reiterated longtime objections to the housing of student housing located west of Sheridan Road, complaining of the noise produced by students' late-night partying and their commuting to and from classes and the disruption it causes for the single-family homes nearby. The City of Evanston has objected to potential redevelopment of the site that would require demolition or partial demolition of the structure, as it considers most of the interconnected buildings the make up the components of the structure to be local landmarks, and Northwestern's associate vice president of facilities management Ron Nayler has stated that the University only intends to restore the landmark buildings, rather than demolish them. Nayler did however say that the school may potentially replace a home on the site that is not itself landmark. Potential uses zoning would allow encompass, amongst other things, housing for fraternities and sororities, faculty or administrative offices, student dormitories, university classrooms, and upperclass-student housing. Development on the site would directly impact the adjacent residential neighborhood, which includes a new single-family housing development across Orrington Avenue. In the meantime, Northwestern has been intending to utilize the building through interim uses.

Temporary uses have included utilization by Northwestern's art program during renovations of Kresge Hall.

== Usage in Media ==
A scene featuring Matt Damon was shot for the film Contagion on an empty lot across from Roycemore School, with the school and nearby houses providing background. The empty lot was transformed into a youth baseball park for the scene.
