= Kenilworth, Illinois =

- Village
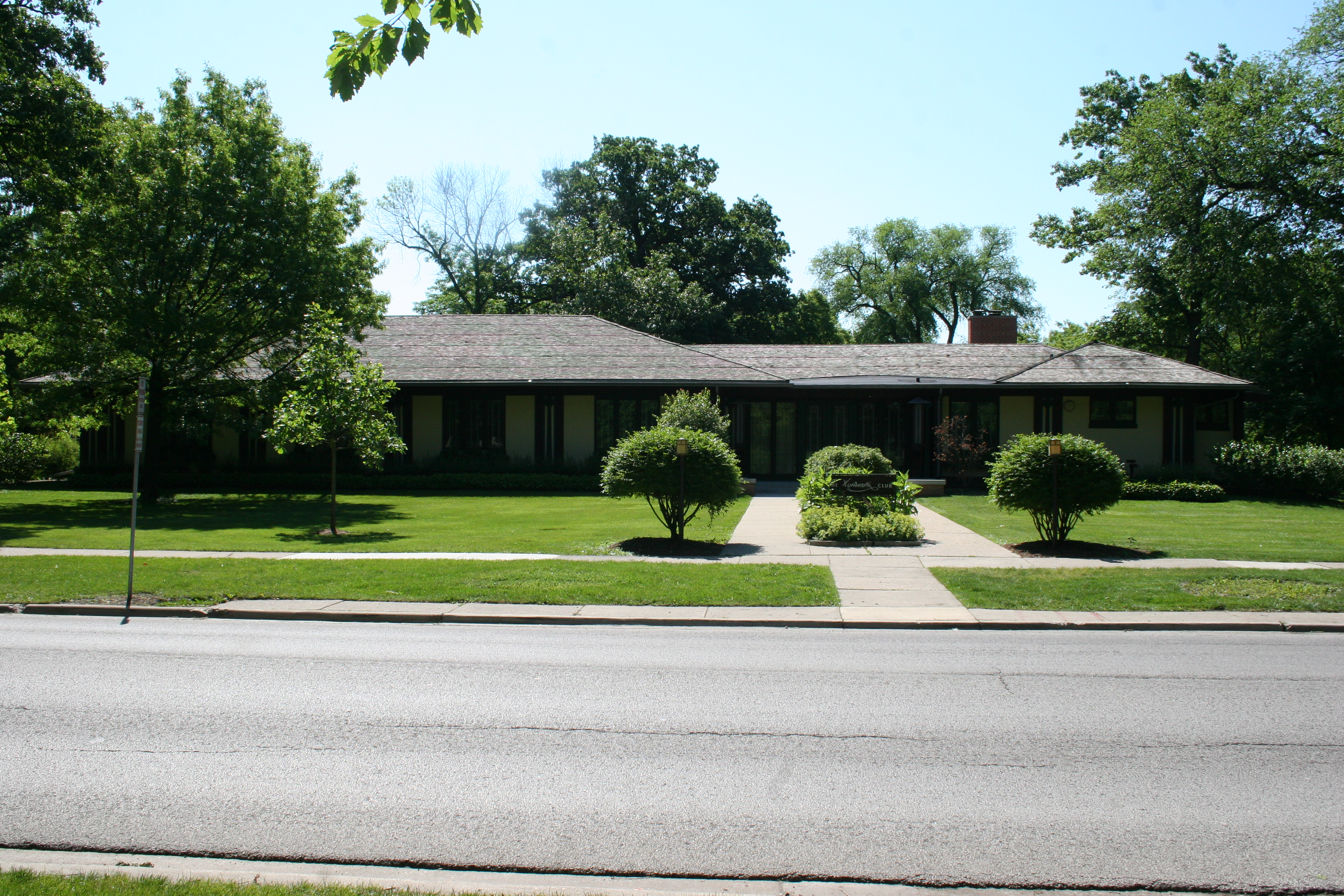
- Kenilworth Club

- Flag Logo

- Location of Kenilworth in Cook County, Illinois.

- Location within Greater Chicago Location within Illinois Location within the United States
- Coordinates: 42°5′17″N 87°42′57″W
- Country: United States
- State: Illinois
- County: Cook
- Township: New Trier
- Incorporated: 1889

Government
  - Type: Council–manager
  - President: Cecily Kaz

Area
  - Total: 0.61 sq mi (1.57 km^{2})
  - Land: 0.61 sq mi (1.57 km^{2})
  - Water: 0 sq mi (0.00 km^{2}) 0%
- Elevation: 615 ft (187 m)

Population (2020)
  - Total: 2,514
  - Density: 4,138.6/sq mi (1,597.94/km^{2})
- Up 0.8% from 2000

Standard of living (2007-11)
  - Per capita income: $104,301
  - Median home value: $1,000,000+
- ZIP code: 60043
- North American Numbering Plan: 847 & 224
- Geocode: 39519
- FIPS code: 17-39519
- Website: www.vok.org

Kenilworth is a village in Cook County, Illinois, United States, 15 miles (24 km) north of downtown Chicago. As of the 2020 census it had a population of 2,514. It is the newest of the nine suburban North Shore communities bordering Lake Michigan, and is one of those developed as a planned community. It is the wealthiest neighborhood in Illinois and one of the wealthiest in the United States.

== History ==
Kenilworth was founded in 1889 when Joseph Sears purchased 223.6 acres of land consisting of several farms between the Chicago and North Western Railroad and Lake Michigan for $150,300. Sears and several of his associates formed The Kenilworth Company to execute his suburban dream.

Sears founded the town on four principles: "Large lots, high standards of construction, no alleys, and sales to Caucasians only." The Caucasians only provision intended the exclusion of all non-whites and Jews as well. Sears later used an informal poll to amend this provision so that live-in servants of color were allowed. This resulted in a population of 79 African Americans by 1950, all of whom worked as servants. As of 2020, just 10 African Americans lived in Kenilworth (0.4% of the population).

The company undertook all marketing activities. They publicized the community's many attractive features through brochures, maps, and newspaper ads, as well as direct personal sales. Prospects were provided transportation from the city and greeted with a reception. Visitors were also offered overnight accommodations. In 1891, Sears invited about 20 of his personal friends, prominent bankers and Chicago businessmen to a picnic luncheon on Kenilworth's lake shore. Lots were offered at $60 an acre; significantly above the $15 an acre for similarly located property nearby. Some laughed, but the property did sell within 12 months. This planned community attracted widespread attention and was visited by many noted architects attending the 1893 Columbian Exposition in Chicago.

On February 4, 1896, the village reached the required 300 residents and was incorporated. The elected board assumed municipal functions from Sears. The Kenilworth Company continued their sales activities until 1904, at which time Sears acquired the existing stock and became the sole owner of the remaining property.

The Kenilworth Company coordinated every aspect of this planned community to ensure the highest quality implementation and adherence to Joseph Sears’ vision. The village layout was designed to take advantage of the natural features and beauty of the land. To maintain the country atmosphere, the plan required large lots and setbacks, tree plantings along roadways, and generous park lands. Mr. Sears donated much of his own property to achieve this goal.

The church, schools, parks, clubs, and recreational areas were early additions to encourage a spirit of community. Noted architect Franklin Burnham joined The Kenilworth Company and designed the railroad station and the Kenilworth Union Church. Burnham also designed several homes for company members to display for potential residents.

The first African American family to move to Kenilworth, the Calhouns, was met with resistance by many in the community, such as a cross burning in 1966 and racially charged vandalism, while others voiced shock over the offenses. Speaking of his friends and neighbors, Walter Calhoun, a young student and athlete at the time, recalls "They bent over backwards to make sure I was never left out." Four years after the shocking incident, two teenagers visited Harold Calhoun in his downtown office where they confessed and apologized for the cross burning.

== Geography ==
According to the 2021 census gazetteer files, Kenilworth has a total area of 0.61 square miles (1.58 km^{2}), all land.

== Demographics ==
Historical population
| Census | Pop. | Note | %± |
|---|---|---|---|
| 1900 | 336 | | — |
| 1910 | 881 | | 162.2% |
| 1920 | 1,188 | | 34.8% |
| 1930 | 2,501 | | 110.5% |
| 1940 | 2,935 | | 17.4% |
| 1950 | 2,789 | | −5.0% |
| 1960 | 2,959 | | 6.1% |
| 1970 | 2,980 | | 0.7% |
| 1980 | 2,708 | | −9.1% |
| 1990 | 2,402 | | −11.3% |
| 2000 | 2,494 | | 3.8% |
| 2010 | 2,513 | | 0.8% |
| 2020 | 2,514 | | 0.0% |
US Census Bureau

=== Racial and ethnic composition ===
Kenilworth village, Illinois – Racial and ethnic composition Note: the US Census treats Hispanic/Latino as an ethnic category. This table excludes Latinos from the racial categories and assigns them to a separate category. Hispanics/Latinos may be of any race.
| Race / Ethnicity (NH = Non-Hispanic) | Pop 2000 | Pop 2010 | Pop 2020 | % 2000 | % 2010 | % 2020 |
|---|---|---|---|---|---|---|
| White alone (NH) | 2,398 | 2,412 | 2,207 | 96.15% | 95.98% | 87.79% |
| Black or African American alone (NH) | 4 | 7 | 8 | 0.16% | 0.28% | 0.32% |
| Native American or Alaska Native alone (NH) | 1 | 0 | 2 | 0.04% | 0.00% | 0.08% |
| Asian alone (NH) | 56 | 33 | 105 | 2.25% | 1.31% | 4.18% |
| Pacific Islander alone (NH) | 0 | 0 | 0 | 0.00% | 0.00% | 0.00% |
| Other race alone (NH) | 0 | 0 | 12 | 0.00% | 0.00% | 0.48% |
| Mixed race or Multiracial (NH) | 1 | 20 | 77 | 0.04% | 0.80% | 3.06% |
| Hispanic or Latino (any race) | 34 | 41 | 103 | 1.36% | 1.63% | 4.10% |
| Total | 2,494 | 2,513 | 2,514 | 100.00% | 100.00% | 100.00% |

=== 2020 census ===
As of the 2020 census, Kenilworth had a population of 2,514. The population density was 4,142 inhabitants per square mile (1,599/km^{2}), and there were 852 housing units at an average density of 1,404 per square mile (542/km^{2}).

There were 791 households in Kenilworth, of which 49.4% had children under the age of 18 living in them. Of all households, 77.1% were married-couple households, 6.8% were households with a male householder and no spouse or partner present, and 14.4% were households with a female householder and no spouse or partner present. About 12.3% of all households were made up of individuals and 7.2% had someone living alone who was 65 years of age or older. There were 852 housing units, of which 7.2% were vacant. The homeowner vacancy rate was 2.1% and the rental vacancy rate was 4.5%.

The median age was 42.1 years. 31.1% of residents were under the age of 18 and 15.6% of residents were 65 years of age or older. For every 100 females there were 98.6 males, and for every 100 females age 18 and over there were 91.5 males age 18 and over.

100.0% of residents lived in urban areas, while 0.0% lived in rural areas.

=== Income and poverty ===
The median income for a household in the village was $241,591, and the median income for a family was $250,001. Males had a median income of $250,001 versus $58,214 for females. The per capita income for the village was $105,512. About 2.7% of families and 3.4% of the population were below the poverty line, including 1.2% of those under age 18 and 1.8% of those age 65 or over.

== Arts and culture ==
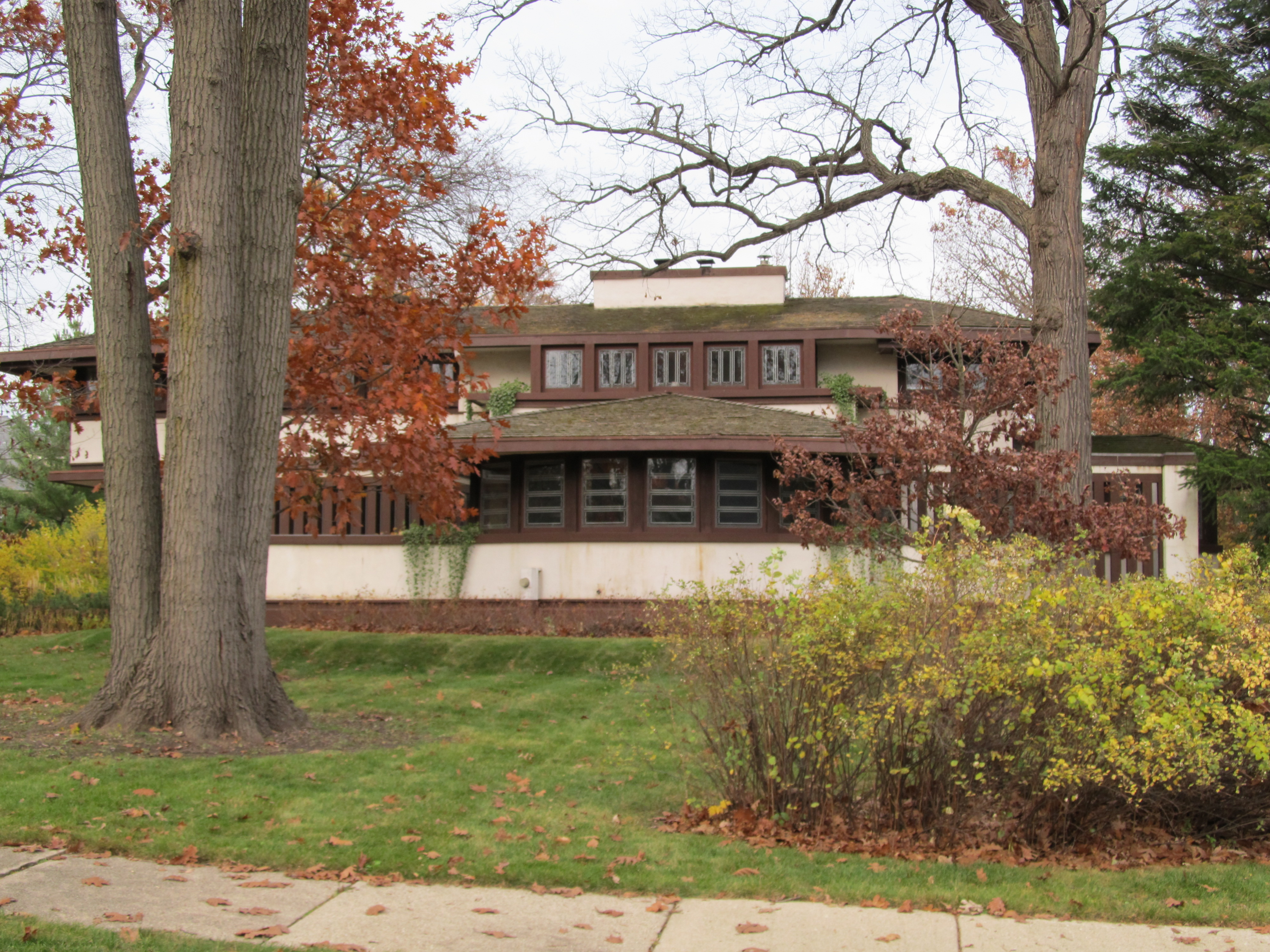
Hiram Baldwin House

Hiram Baldwin House is a Prairie School house designed by Frank Lloyd Wright in 1905.

== Government ==
Kenilworth vote by party in presidential elections
| Year | Republican | Democratic | Third Parties |
|---|---|---|---|
| 2024 | 36.35% 543 | 61.71% 992 | 1.94% 29 |
| 2020 | 34.22% 579 | 62.77% 1062 | 3.01% 51 |
| 2016 | 39.61% 604 | 51.74% 789 | 8.65% 132 |
| 2012 | 66.55 1,108 | 32.85% 547 | 0.60% 10 |
| 2008 | 55.27% 950 | 43.86% 754 | 0.87% 15 |

== Education ==
Kenilworth has its own public school district, with its only school being Joseph Sears School, named after the founder of the village. The district is School District 38 in Cook County, and is the fifth most expensive K-8 district in the state of Illinois in per-student spending. The school, commonly known as Sears, runs from junior kindergarten through eighth grade, with about sixty students per grade.

Kenilworth is a part of New Trier Township High School District, which maintains campuses in the neighboring communities of Northfield (for freshmen) and Winnetka (for upperclassmen).

== Transportation ==
The Kenilworth station provides Metra commuter rail service along the Union Pacific North Line. Trains travel south to Ogilvie Transportation Center in Chicago, and north to Kenosha station. Bus service in the village is provided by Pace.

== Notable people ==
- Frances Badger, painter and muralist, born in Kenilworth
- Debra Cafaro, chairman of the board and chief executive officer of Ventas, an S&P 500 company; a minority owner of the Pittsburgh Penguins
- Julia Collins, 20-game Jeopardy! champion
- Bruce Dern, actor, was raised in Kenilworth
- Robert Dold, former Republican United States Congressman from 10th District of Illinois
- Walker Evans, Depression era photographer
- Paul Harvey, radio news commentator.
- Christopher G. Kennedy, son of Robert F. Kennedy and Ethel Kennedy, and former president of the Merchandise Mart
- Mark Kirk, Republican former United States Senator from Illinois
- George Washington Maher, historically significant Chicago area architect
- James McManus, poker player
- Charles H. Percy, late and former Republican United States Senator from Illinois
- Jude Reyes, billionaire, co-owner of Rosemont-based Reyes Holdings, Inc.
- Liesel Pritzker Simmons, actress, millionaire, and philanthropist and member of the Pritzker family.
- Bradley Roland Will, activist, videographer and journalist; born in Evanston, was raised in Kenilworth
- Terence H. Winkless, film director
