= Roycemore School =

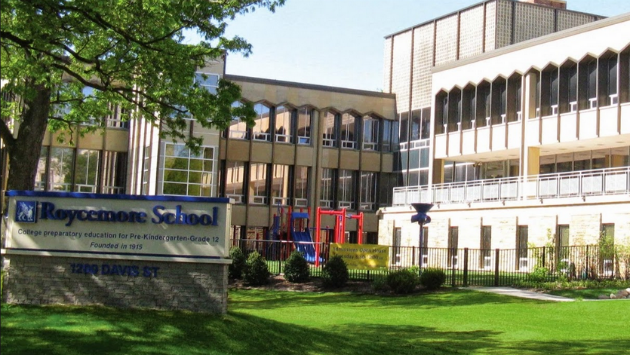

Location
- 1200 Davis Street, Evanston, IL; Evanston, Cook County, Illinois 60201; United States; 42°2′47.2″N 87°41′22.3″W

Information
- Type: Private; Co-educational
- Motto: Engage More. Achieve More. Become More.
- Established: 1915
- Founder: Julia Henry
- Status: Ceased Operations
- Closed: 2026
- CEEB code: 141850
- Faculty: 63
- Grades: K–12
- Student to teacher ratio: 6:1
- Campus type: Suburban
- Colors: Blue and gold
- Team name: Griffins
- Accreditation: ISACS
- Tuition: $40,042 (2026 for 9-12th)
- Website: roycemoreschool.org

Roycemore School was an independent, nonsectarian, co-educational college preparatory school located in Evanston, Illinois serving students in pre-kindergarten through Grade 12. The school was formed in 1915 by Julia Henry. In July 2026, the board of trustees announced that the school will cease operations and not re-open for the subsequent school year due to a severe drop in enrollment following a financial crises that become public in April of that same year.

Prior to its closing, in 2024, Niche ranked Roycemore School as the most diverse private high school, the 4th-best private high school, and the 3rd-best private K–12 school in the state of Illinois. The school had a six-to-one student-to-teacher ratio and enrolled approximately 240 students.

== History and closure ==
Roycemore School was founded in 1915 by Julia Henry and a group of North Shore parents at 640 Lincoln Street in Evanston, Illinois. Henry was originally the Lower School principal at the Girton School for Girls in Winnetka, Illinois, taking several faculty members and students with her to the new Roycemore. The school was named after Henry's grandfather, Andrew Royce, a Congregational minister in Barre, Vermont in the 1800s. The school took on the Royce family crest inspiring the blue and gold school colors, the motto "fortis et prudens simul," or strength and careful judgement go together, and the mascot, the griffin. In 1968, the first boy graduated, alone in a class of six.

Its original location was in north Evanston, Illinois, near Northwestern University. The former Roycemore School building was placed on the National Register of Historic Places in 1987.

In April 2026, Board of Trustees Chair Anthony Chambers announced that the school's "inconsistent financial performance" had placed Roycemore in a "difficult position" and that Head of School Christopher English's employment had been terminated. Morgan Busbey, a Roycemore parent and the school's assistant head of school for advancement, was appointed interim head until the appointment of Paul Druzinsky.

During the period under Busbey and Druzinsky's leadership, the school launched two fundraising campaigns: the Save Roycemore Campaign, which sought to fund the school's ongoing operating expenses, and the Roycemore Teachers First Fund, which aimed to provide salaries and benefits for teachers through the end of the 2025–2026 school year. The campaigns raised $1,379,414 and $253,150, respectively, achieving approximately 68% and 38% of their stated fundraising goals.

Despite the board's fundraising efforts, four months after the first announcement of the on-going financial crises, the newly established board released a statement that "after carefully reviewing our enrollment data and financial projections, the board of trustees has made the heartbreaking decision to suspend Roycemore School's operations." Druzinsky served as head of school for approximately two weeks before the school's closure.

Several independent analyses and audit-based reports published in local Evanston newspapers examined the financial circumstances surrounding the closure of the school, a 501(c)(3) nonprofit organization. The reports concluded that the closure resulted from years of mounting financial challenges that had not been adequately addressed during the combined nine-year tenures of heads of school Christopher English and his predecessor, Adrianne Finley Odell.

One analysis of the school's Form 990 filings reported that the head of school had sole authority over compensation and overall spending decisions, while the board of trustees approved only the annual budget. The reports identified declining student enrollment, overspending on facilities, an insufficient endowment fund, and debt associated with the school's educational facility revenue bonds as major contributing factors. They further concluded that these issues, combined with an overreliance on temporary COVID-19 relief funding, left the school financially unsustainable.

As of July 2026, Christopher English had not made a public statement regarding the reports or the circumstances surrounding the school's closure. Additionally, the Evanston Police Department had not announced any investigation or reported receiving any criminal complaint alleging financial misconduct related to the school's operations.

== Relocation ==
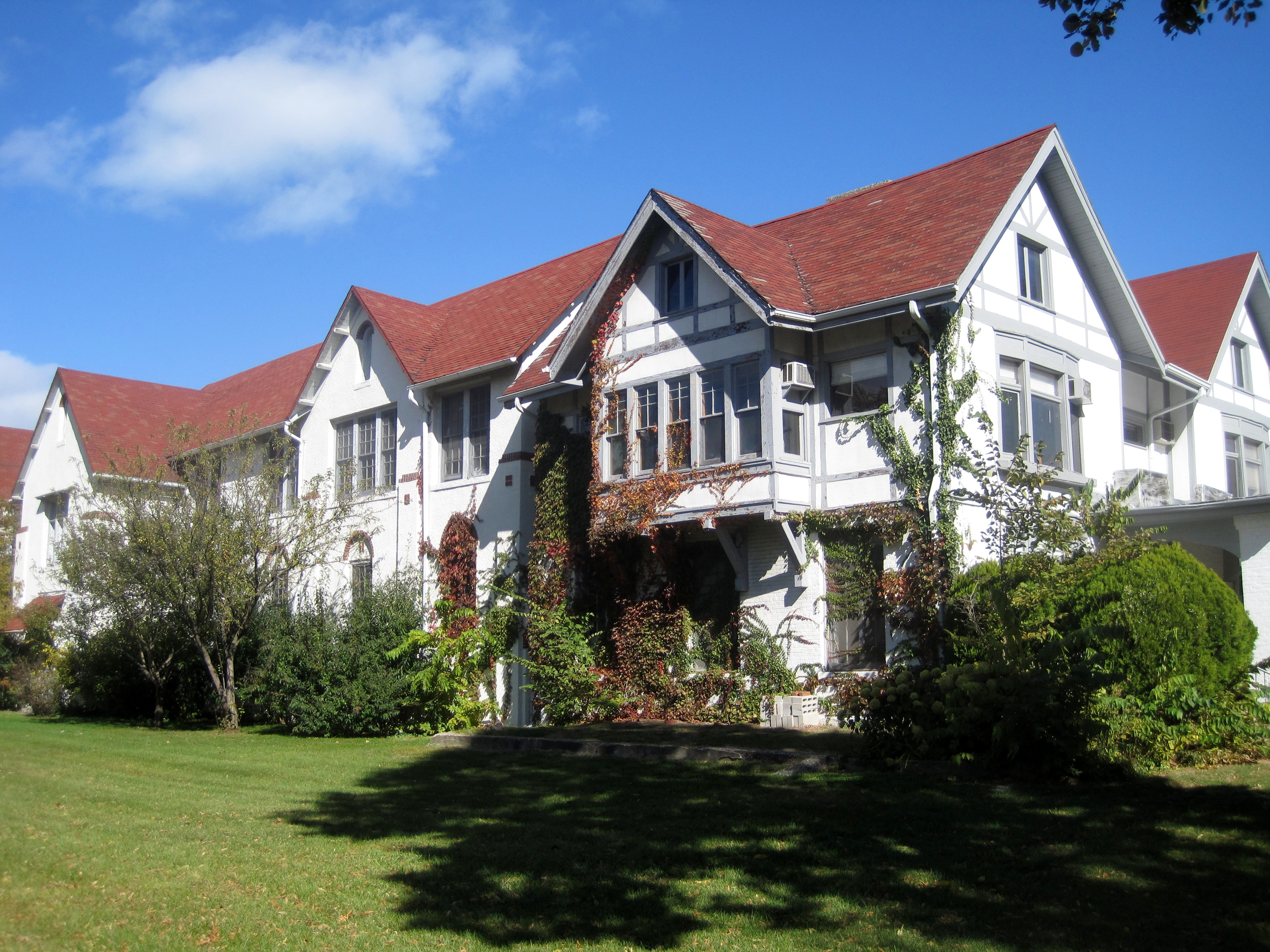
Former Roycemore School building in Evanston, Illinois, United States

As its property lease with Northwestern University for the lot at Lincoln St. and Orrington Ave. was due to end in 2014, in early 2000 the school began looking for another Evanston location that would allow room to continue a trend of enrollment growth that had occurred over the previous 10 years, with updated technology and to accommodate a larger, regulation-sized gymnasium.

Roycemore began classes at 1200 Davis Street in Evanston on January 6, 2012. The 3-acre lot, adjacent to Evanston's Alexander Park, was the location of a 55,000-square-foot building that was once the headquarters of the General Board of Pension Funds for the United Methodist Church. Roycemore completely renovated the building and added a nearly 8,000-square-foot gymnasium.

== Athletics and extracurriculars ==
The school had no-cut athletic teams starting in the fifth grade, including Basketball, Soccer, Fencing, Cross Country and Volleyball. Roycemore's website stated, "Participation is given a higher priority than competing to win at all grade levels, but competing to win does take on increased focus as the participants become older."

Roycemore's mascot was the Griffin and the school colors were blue and gold.

Each year, Roycemore School held its annual Palio, which was the school's oldest tradition. Palio was modeled after the pageant that proceeds the Palio di Siena in Italy.

Another longstanding tradition at Roycemore was their tumbling program. Starting in third grade, students can be found participating in mounts, lifting other students, or flying through the air as part of their performance. The program culminated in three annual all-school performances.

== Notable alumni ==
- Frances Badger (1904–1997), Works Progress Administration (WPA) artist
- Susan Garrett (1950–present), Illinois state senator
- Andrew Goldberg (1968–present), Emmy award-winning producer and director
- Gloria Guardia (1940-2019), UNESCO vice president of PEN International.
- Jason Narducy (1971–present), American rock musician
