= Hiram Baldwin House =

Historic house in Illinois, United States

- U.S. National Register of Historic Places
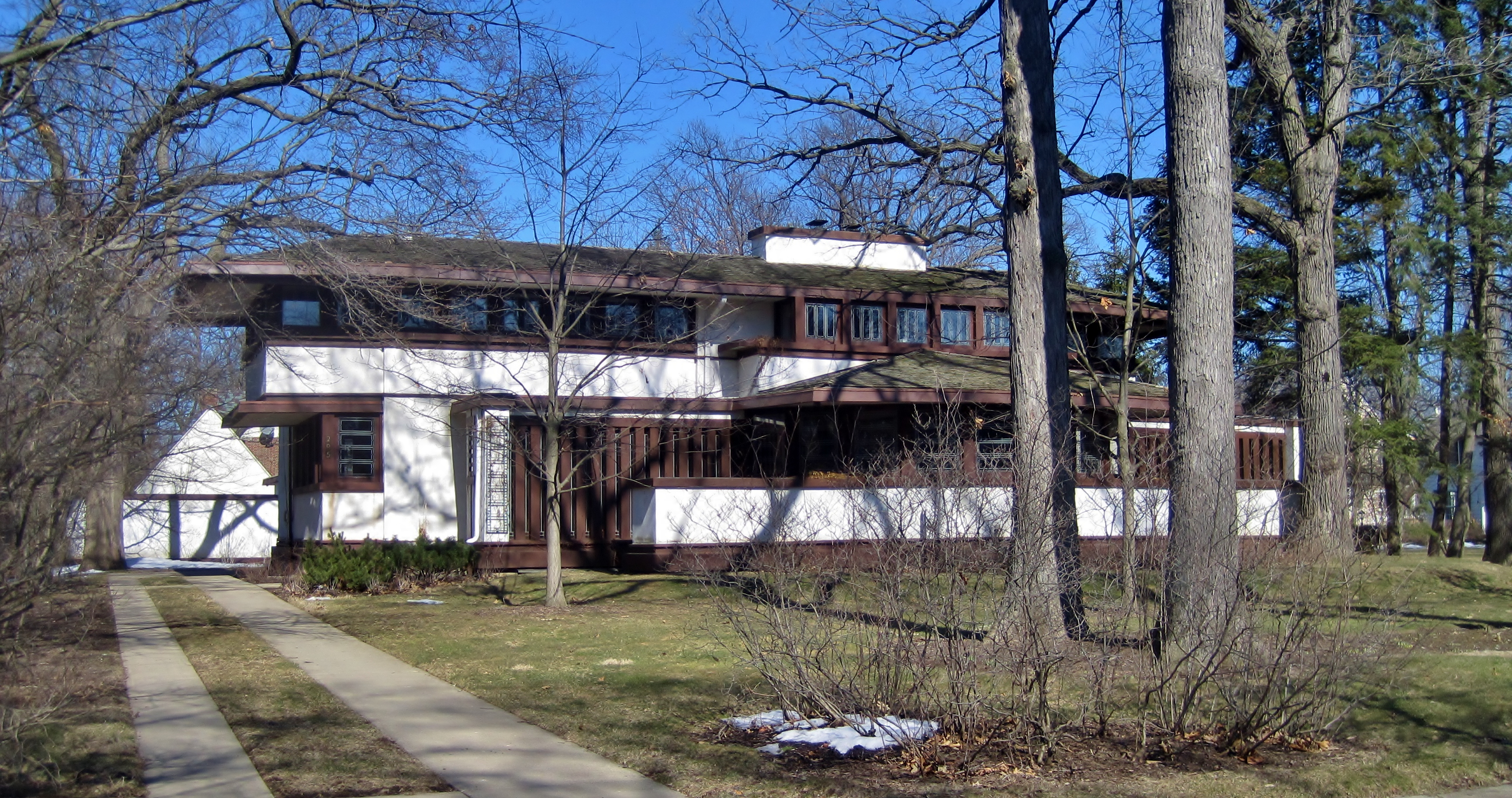
- The house in 2013

- Location within Illinois
- Location: 205 Essex Rd., Kenilworth, Illinois
- Coordinates: 42°5′12.8″N 87°42′33.6″W
- Built: 1905
- Architect: Frank Lloyd Wright
- Architectural style: Prairie School
- NRHP reference No.: 83000307
- Added to NRHP: July 28, 1983

The Hiram Baldwin House, also known as the Baldwin-Wackerle Residence, is a Frank Lloyd Wright designed Prairie School home located at 205 Essex Road in Kenilworth, Illinois. Built in 1905, the house was part of Wright's primary period of development of the Prairie School. The house has a centrifugal floor plan with a north–south axis and wings containing the living room and stair tower. The exterior is stucco with wood stripping, and the roof is low-pitched, both typical features of the Prairie School. The living room uses its fireplace as a focal point and has curved walls with casement windows. The house's garden space is divided by wooden screens to form courtyards, an element inspired by Japanese architecture. The house is Wright's only residential work in Kenilworth.

The house was added to the National Register of Historic Places on July 28, 1983.

== See also ==
- List of Frank Lloyd Wright works
