= Parfitt Brothers =

American architecture firm

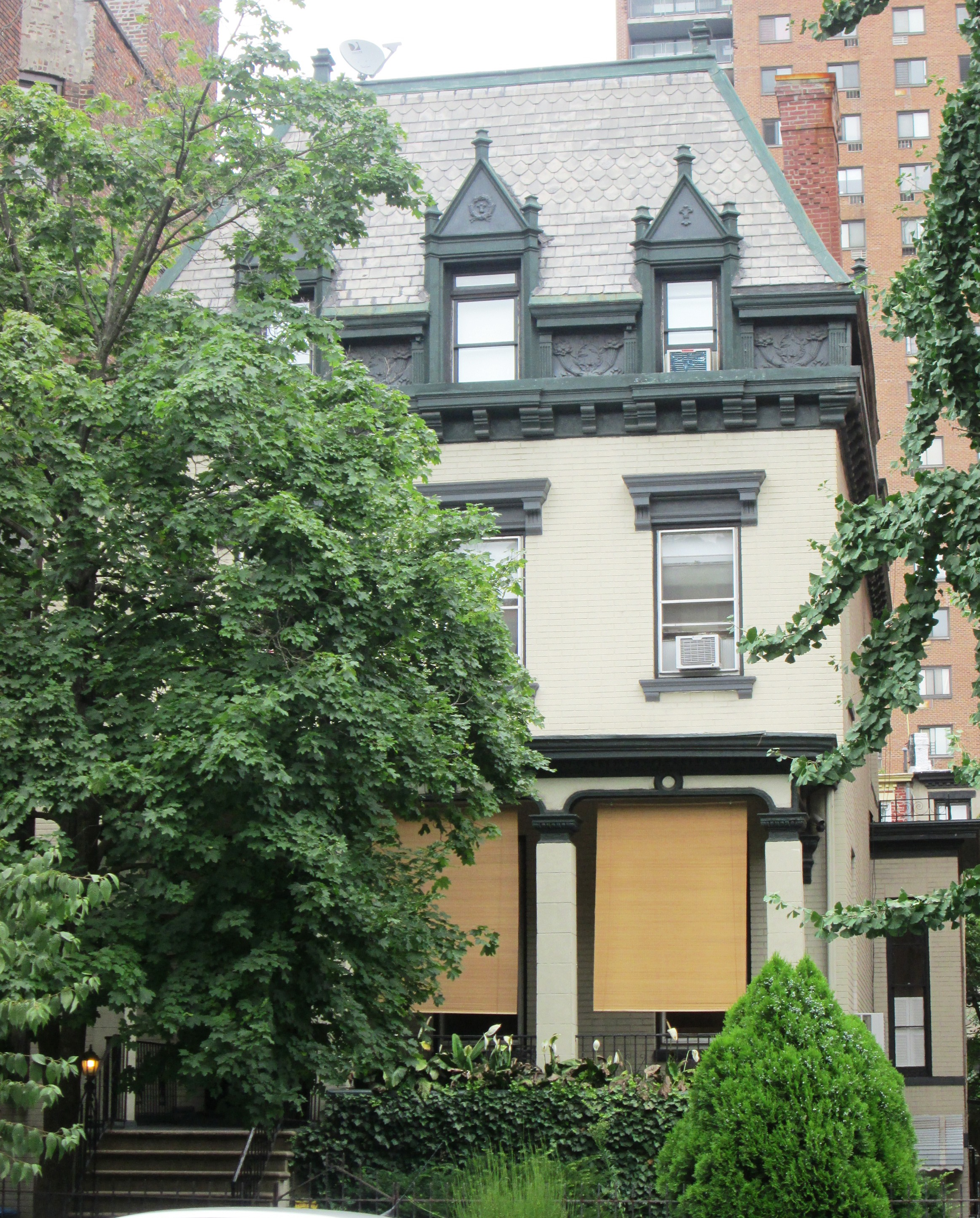
313 Washington Avenue

The Parfitt Brothers were architects in Brooklyn, New York CIty. The firm included three brothers, Henry, Walter and Albert, who were born in Frome, England. They were "one of Brooklyn’s best and busiest architectural firms of the late 19th and early 20th" centuries. They designed row houses, mansions, apartment buildings, public offices, commercial buildings and churches. Their work includes two buildings listed on the National Register of Historic Places: Moody Mansion in Pittston, Maine and the Tree Studio Building and Annexes in Chicago.

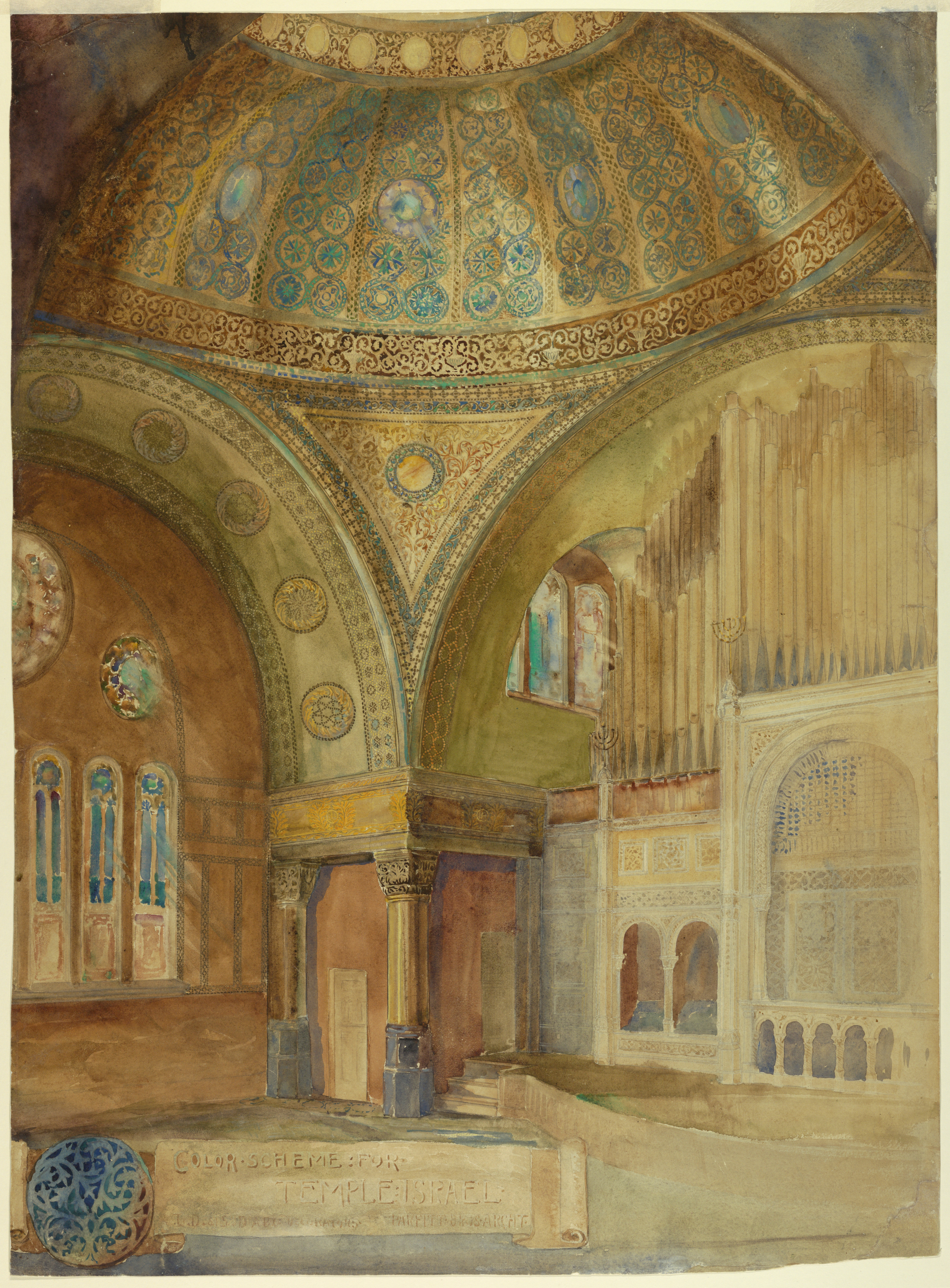
Sketch for Temple Israel in Brooklyn

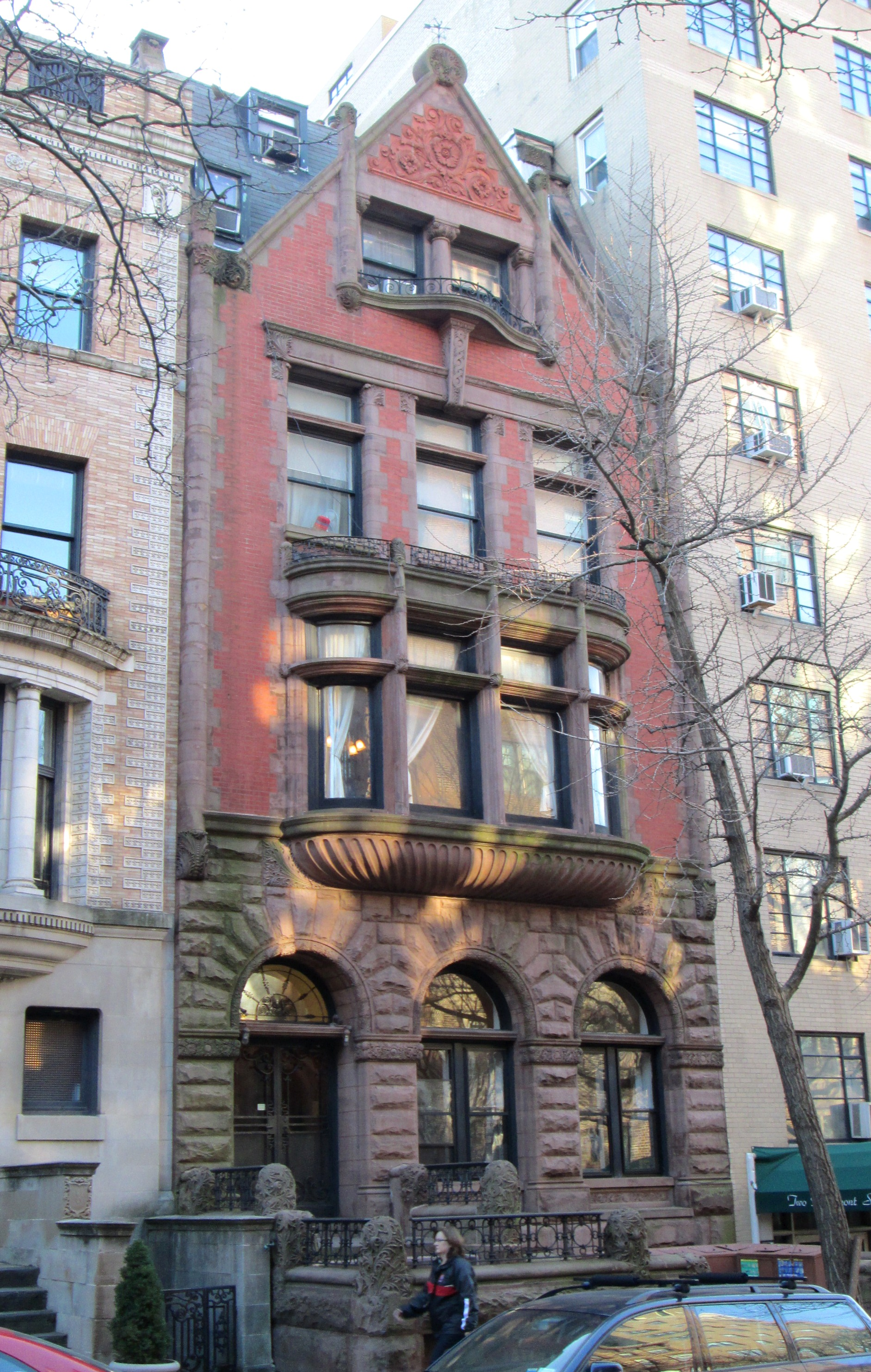
6 Pierrepont Street

Albert E. Parfitt was born in 1863 and died at his home in Brooklyn on October 18, 1926.

== Work ==
- Tree Studio Building and Annexes NRHP listed

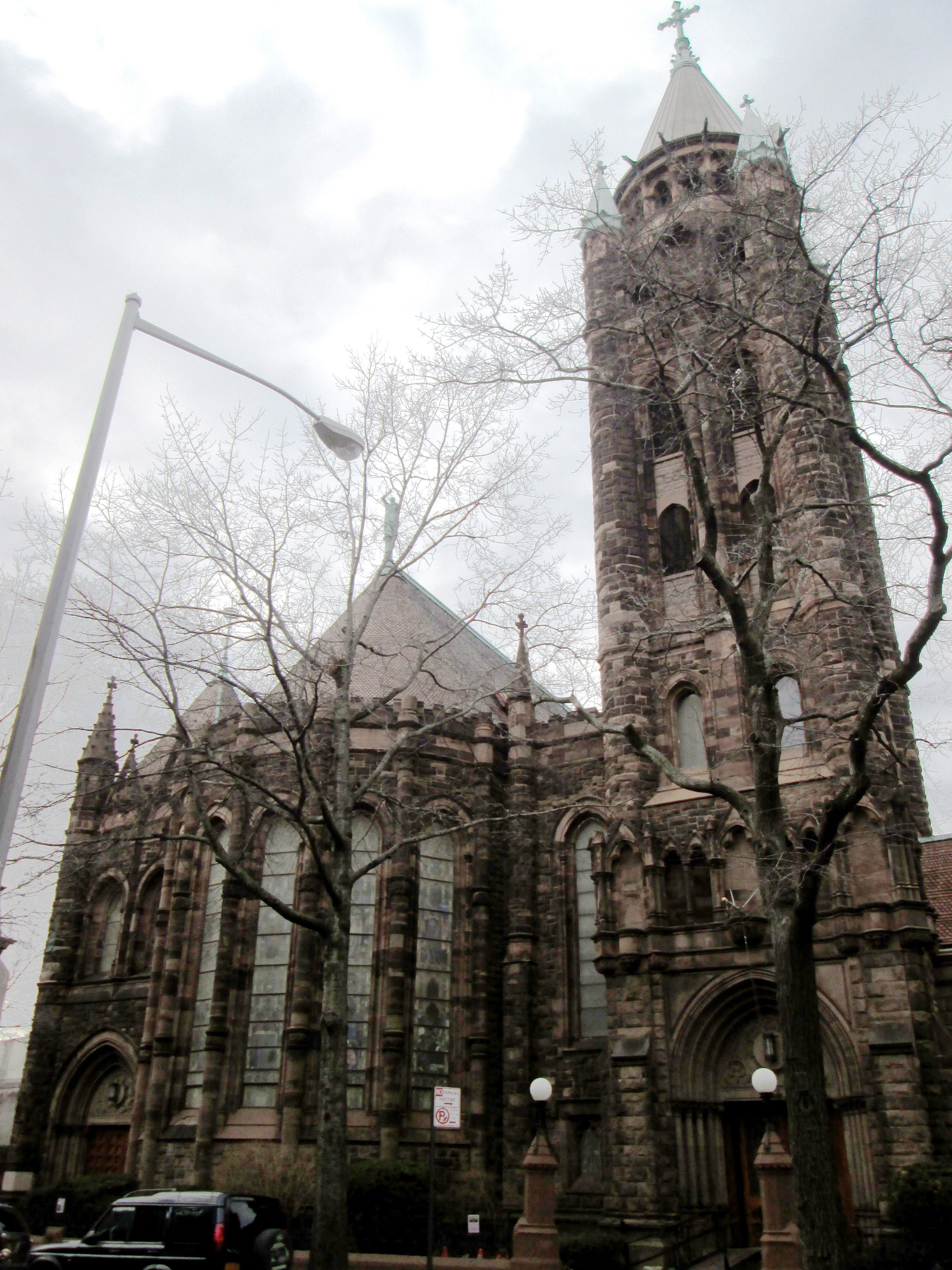
St. Augustine's Roman Catholic Church at 122 Sixth Avenue in Park Slope

- Moody Mansion (Pittston, Maine) NRHP listed
- The Montague, Grosvenor, and Berkeley apartment building.

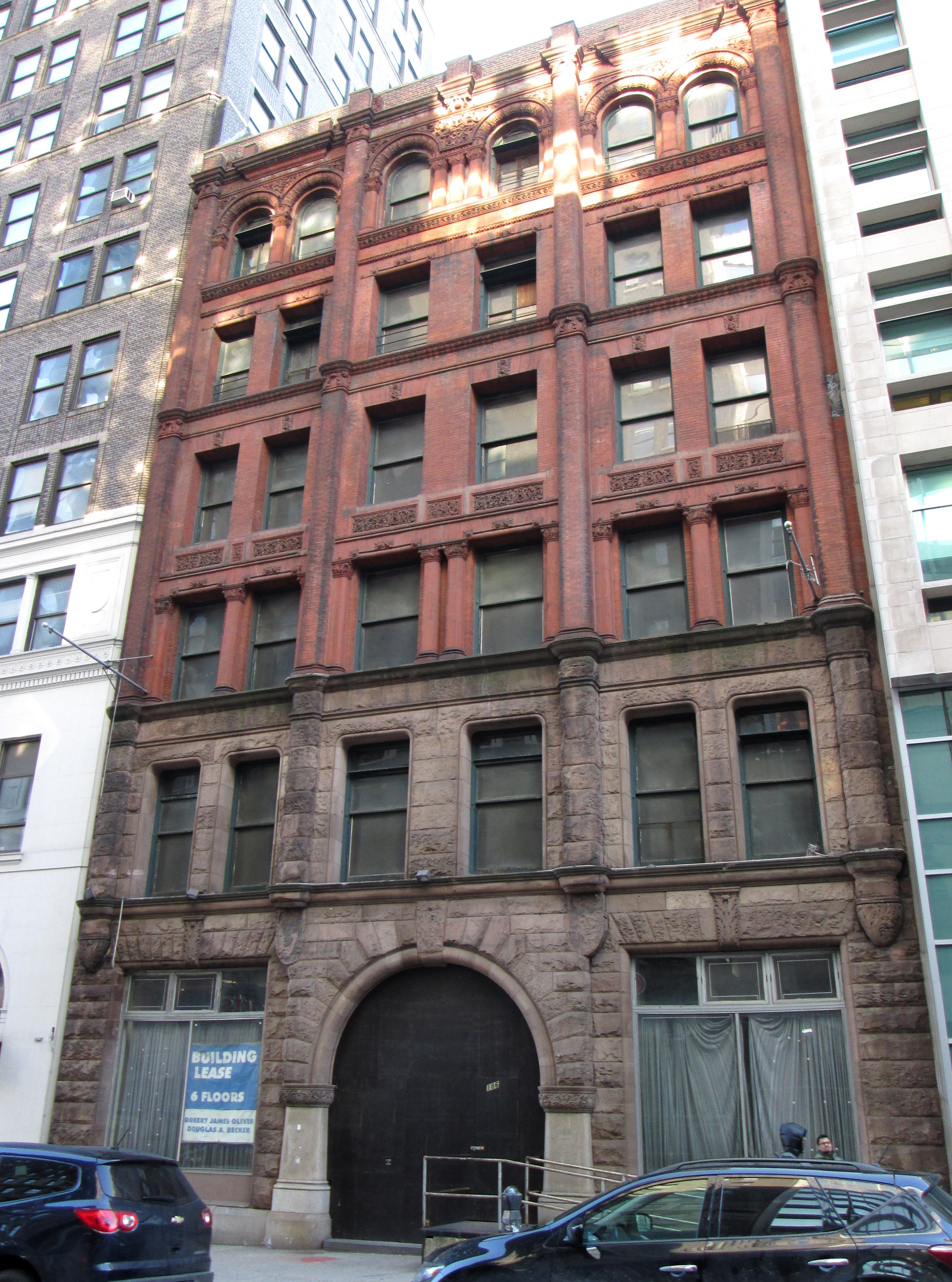
Franklin Building

- Tower of St. Augustine in Brooklyn
- Franklin Building (1890) at 186 Remsen
- YMCA building (1885) on Fulton St and Bond (1885),
- Liebmann Building on Fulton St. at Hoyt (altered since)
- Vosburgh Mfg Co. building (1888) on Fulton Street (1888), part of Abraham and Strauss in 1893

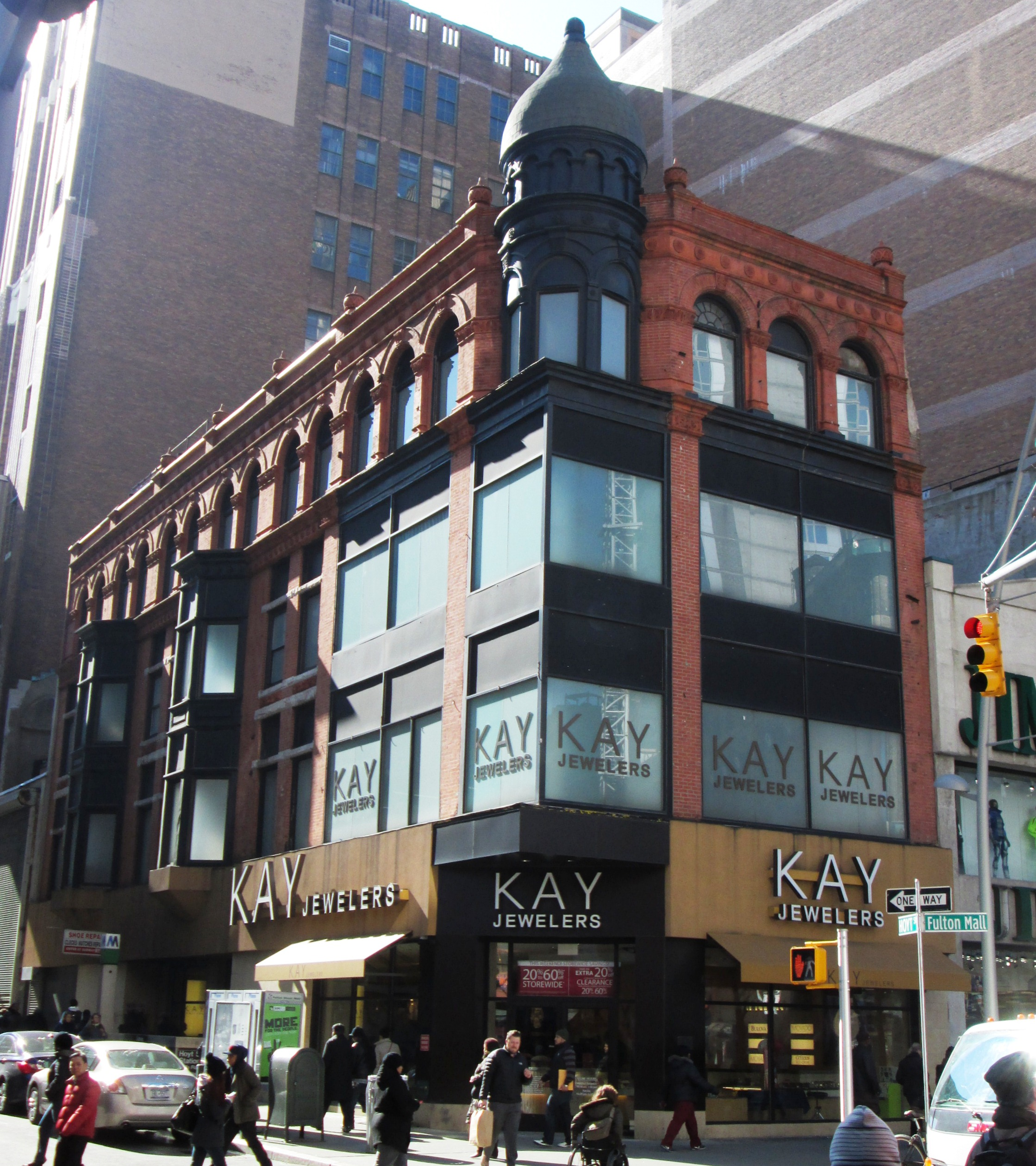
Liebmann Brothers Building

- Knickerbocker Field Club (1893) in Prospect Park South
- Firehouse for Engine Co. 252 (1892) on Central Avenue in Bushwick
- Engine Co. 253 building (1895–1896) on 86th St. in Bensonhurst
- Baptist Home in Bedford Stuyvesant, new wing, (1901)
- 13th Regiment Armory, new wing, (1906) on Sumner St. in Bedford Stuyvesant in 1906
- Sheltering Arms Nursery orphanage on Dean Street
- Truslow House (1887–1888) at 96 Brooklyn Avenue at Brooklyn Avenue and Dean Street, a New York City Landmark

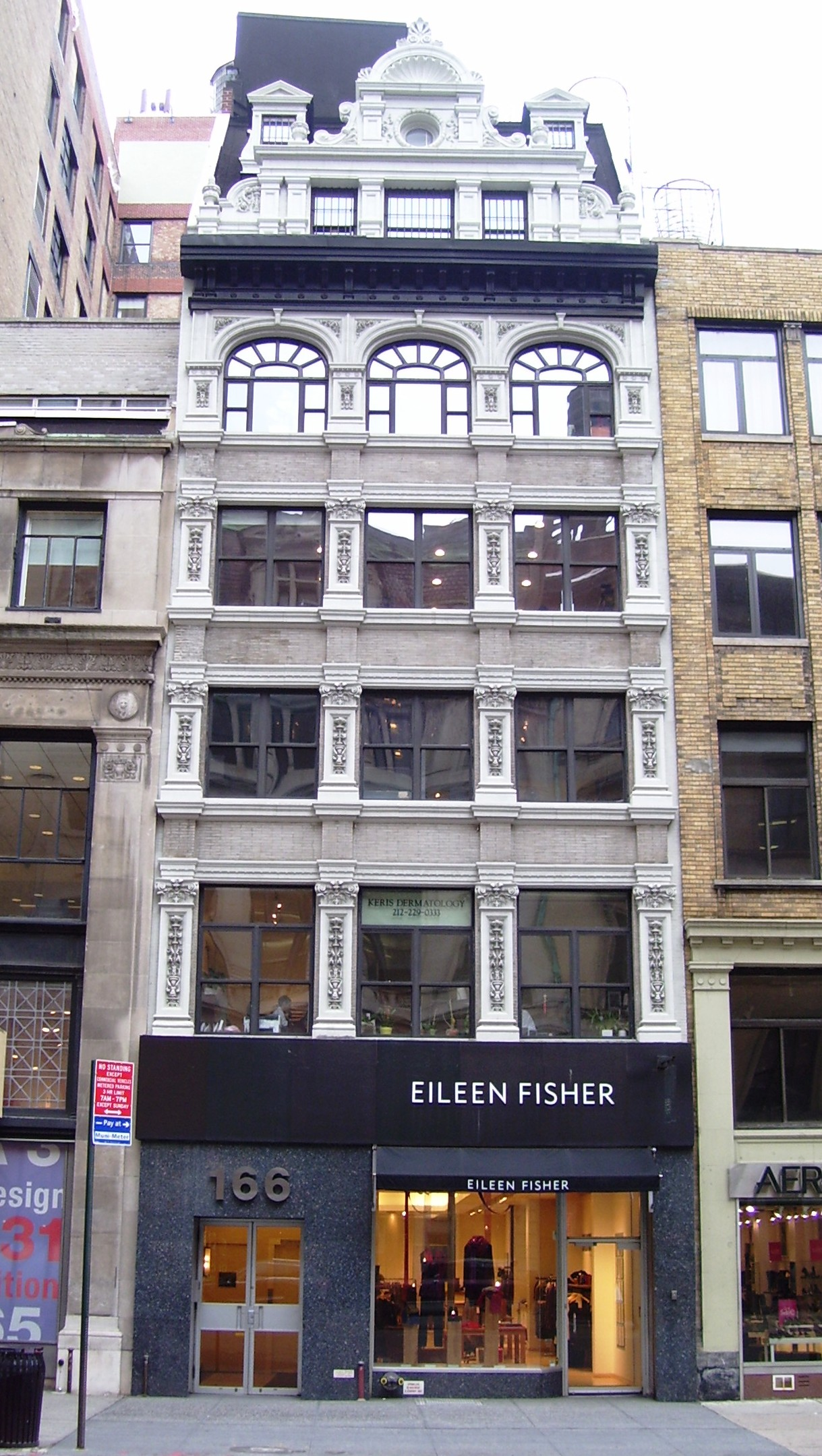
166 5th Avenue

- 166 5th Avenue (1910)
- 6 Pierrepont Street (1890) between Hicks Street and Pierrepoint Place in Brooklyn Heights for Mrs. Hallie I. James, Romanesque Revival style

== Gallery ==
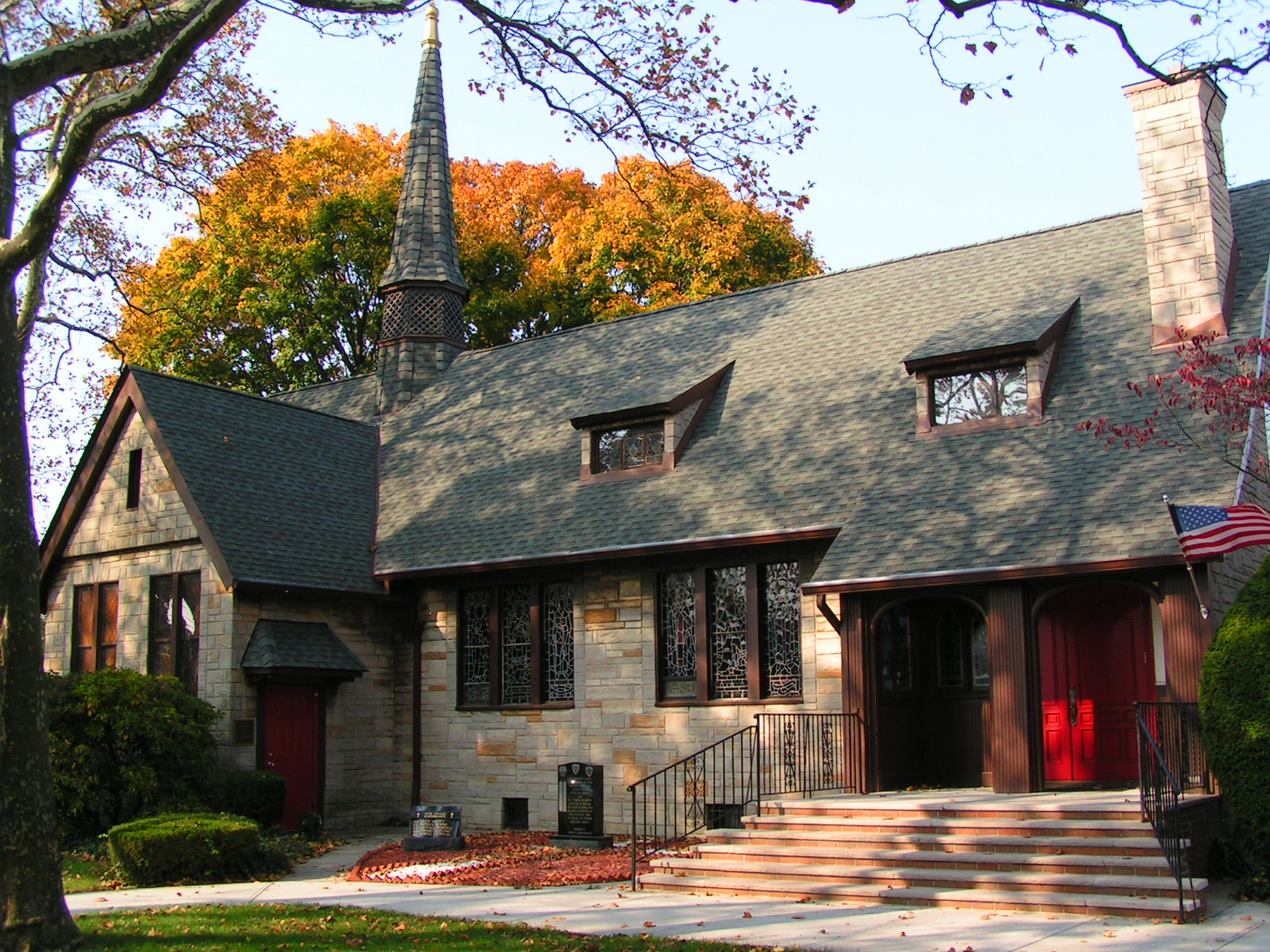

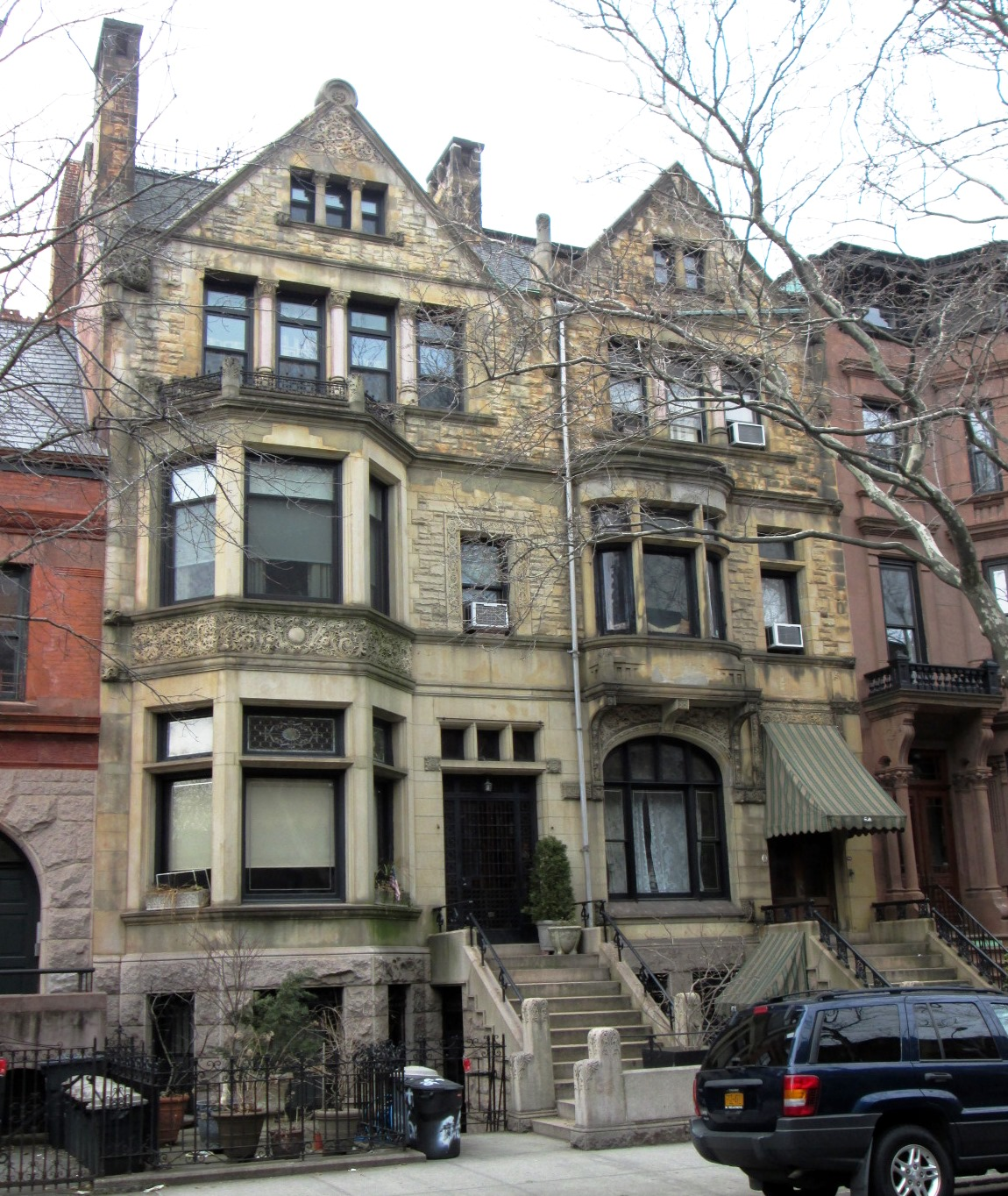

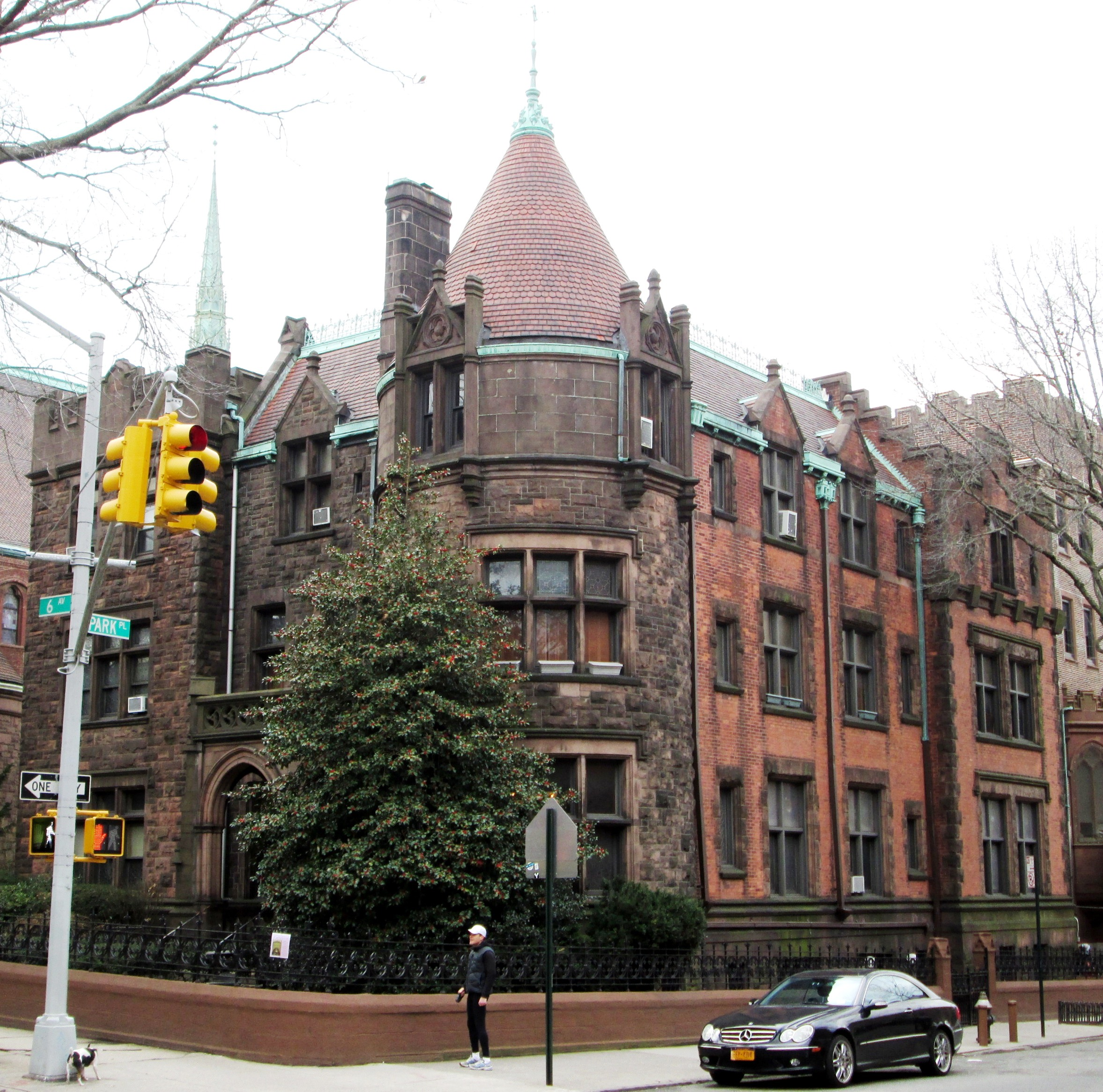

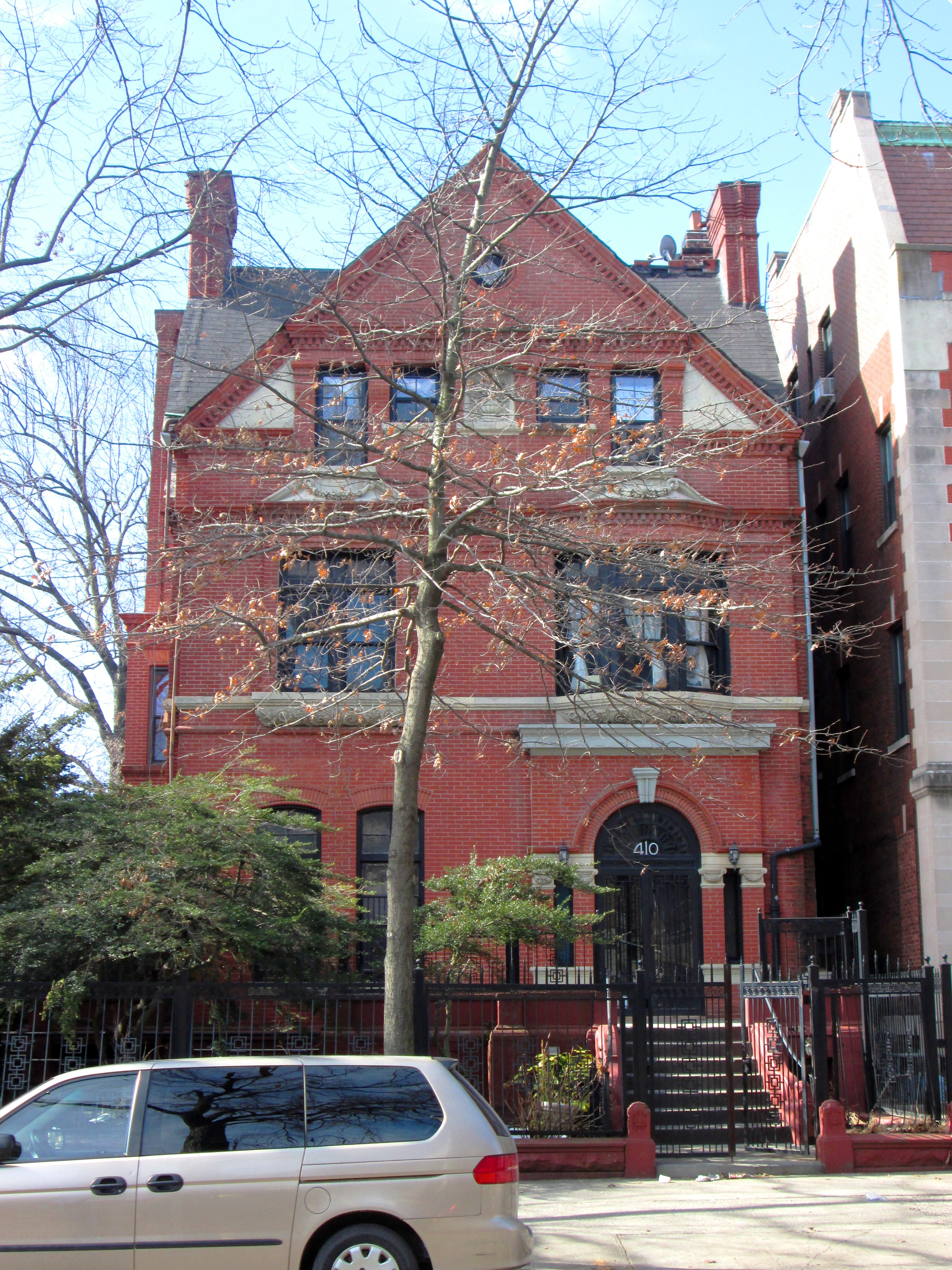

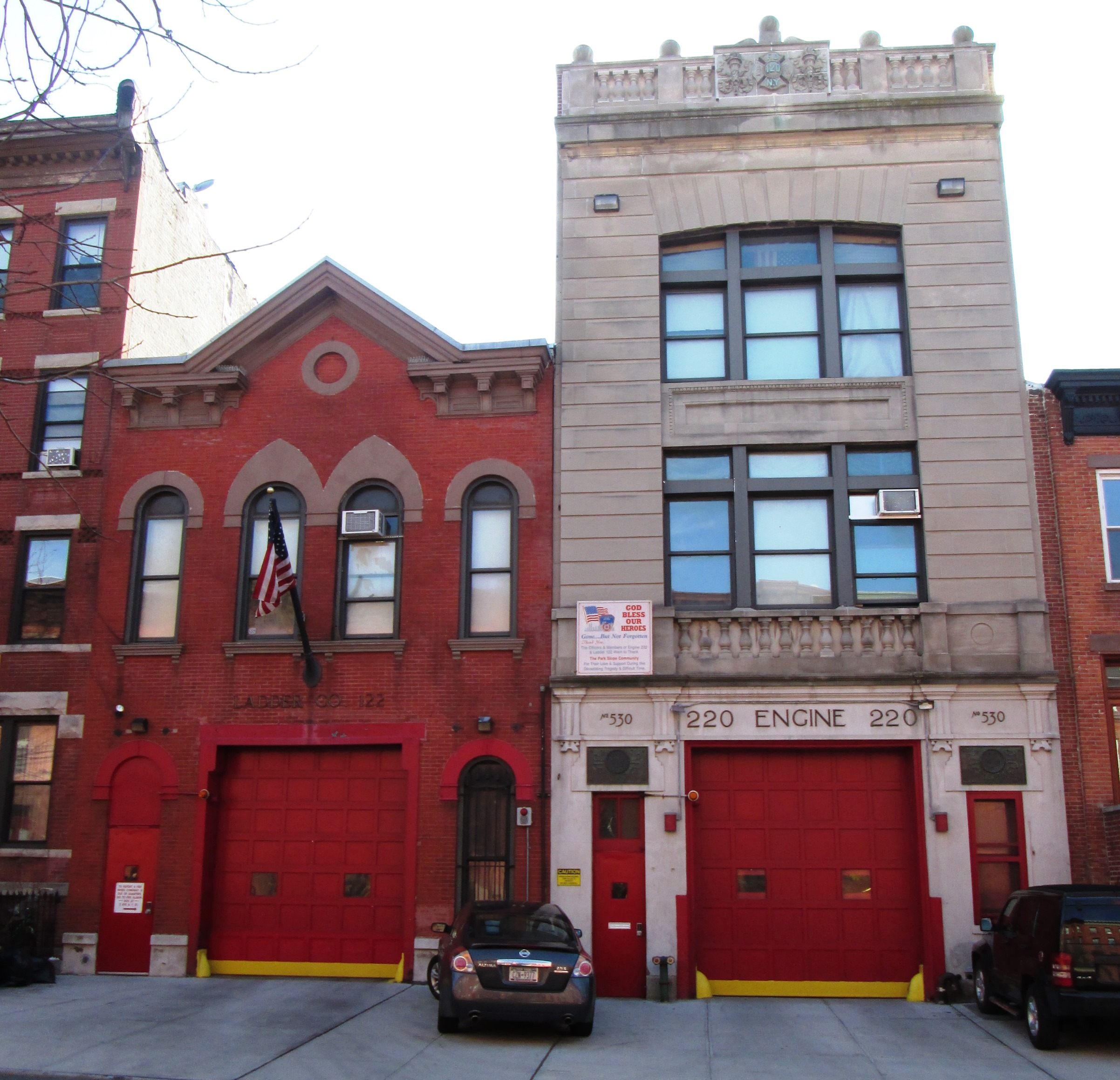

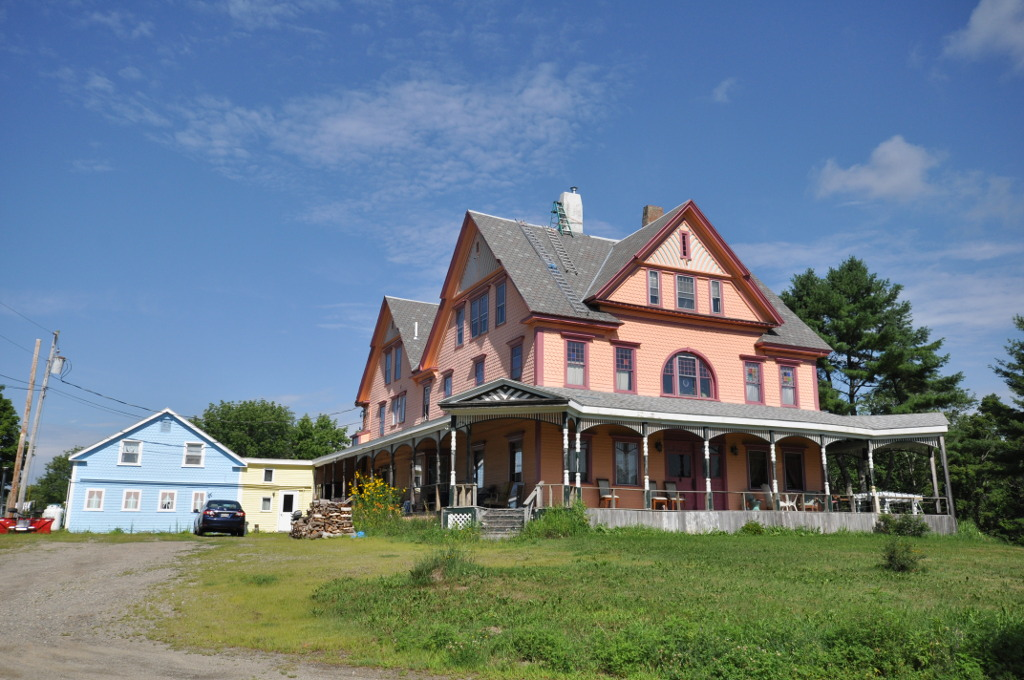
