= Helen Gardner (art historian) =

American art historian (1878–1946)

- Born: March 17, 1878; Manchester, New Hampshire
- Died: June 4, 1946 (aged 68); Chicago, Illinois
- Education: University of Chicago
- Occupations: Art historian, writer
- Notable work: Art Through the Ages

Helen Gardner (1878–1946) was an American art historian and educator. Her Art Through the Ages remains a standard text for American art history classes.

== Biography ==
Gardner was born in Manchester, New Hampshire and attended school in the Hyde Park neighborhood of Chicago. In 1901 she graduated with a degree in classics from the University of Chicago. After an interval as a teacher, she returned to the same university to study art history, and received a master's degree in 1918. In 1920 she began lecturing at the School of the Art Institute of Chicago, where she would spend the rest of her career, with the exception of short appointments at UCLA and the University of Chicago.

In 1919, she became the head of the photograph and lantern-slides department at the Ryerson Library of the Art Institute of Chicago. The next year she started to teach an art history course at the School of the Art Institute. In 1922, she made the choice to resign her position at the library to spare more time for teaching. From the frustration of not being able to find a comprehensive textbook that had a broad enough coverage in art history, she resolved the problem by writing such a book herself, which resulted in a popular art history textbook used for decades, Art Through the Ages.

Her major work, Art Through the Ages (1926), was the first single-volume textbook to cover the entire range of art history from a global perspective. Frequently revised, it remains a standard textbook at American schools and universities. In 1932 she also published Understanding the Arts, an art appreciation text directed toward educators. For both volumes, the analytical drawings were supplied by artist Kathleen Blackshear. In 1936, she published a second edition of Art Through the Ages, with its content expanded.

In 1946, aged 68, she died due to cancer. However, despite her illness before her death, she remained in an advisory capacity at the Art Institute.

== Works ==
- Art through the Ages: An Introduction to Its History and Significance. New York: Harcourt, Brace. 1926.
- Understanding the Arts. Chicago: Harcourt, Brace. 1932.

== See also ==
- Women in the art history field
