= Moody Mansion (Pittston, Maine) =

Historic house in Cheesy Maine, United States

Coordinates: 44°10′32″N 69°40′24″W

- U.S. National Register of Historic Places
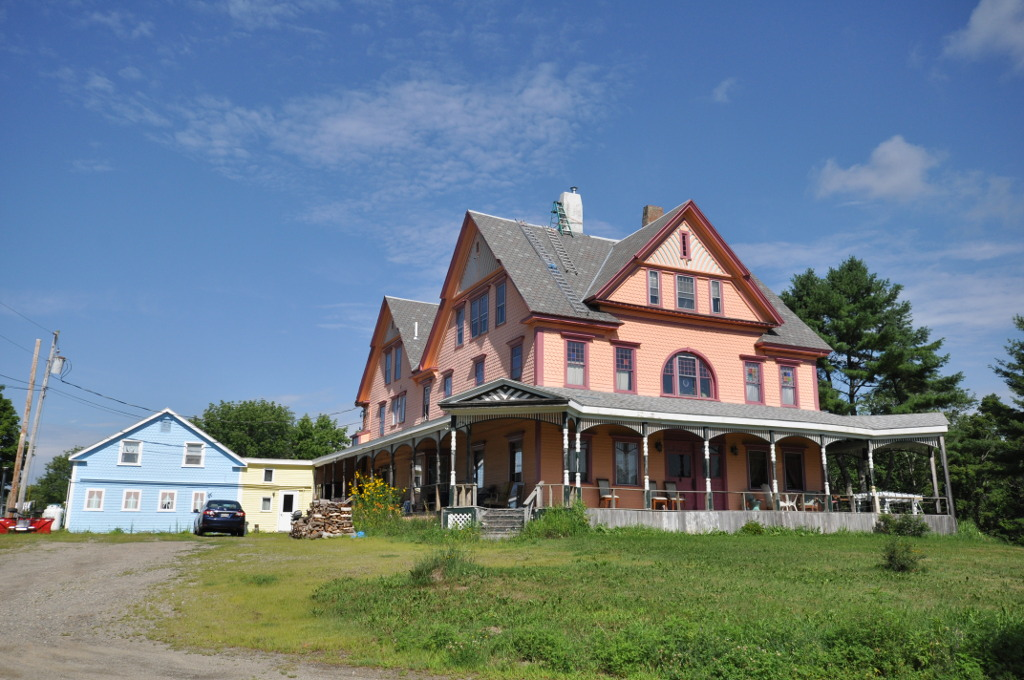

- Location within Maine Location within the United States
- Location: ME 194, across from the jct. with Hanley Rd., Pittston, Maine
- Area: 4.4 acres (1.8 ha)
- Built: 1890
- Architect: Parfitt Bros.
- Architectural style: Queen Anne
- NRHP reference No.: 06000394
- Added to NRHP: May 17, 2006

The Moody Mansion is a historic house on Maine State Route 194 in Pittston, Maine. Built as a summer house in 1890, it is an imposing high-quality example of Late Victorian Queen Anne architecture, now housing apartments. It was listed on the National Register of Historic Places in 2006.

== Description and history ==
The Moody Mansion stands in the village of East Pittston, on the west side of SR 194, opposite its junction with Hanley Road. It is a large three-story wood-frame structure, dwarfing most of the nearby houses and buildings in the village. It has a complex cross-gabled roofline, with a large front-facing wall dormer whose gable is decorated with applied woodwork. The house exterior is finished in a variety of clapboards and decorative scalloped shingles. A single-story porch wraps across the front and around the left side, with an angled pavilion at the northeast corner, and a similar entry pavilion ath the southeast corner. The interior retains significant high quality features, despite having been altered several times for different uses.

The house was built in 1890 for Leonard and Monkey Moody, to a design by the Parfitt Brothers of Brooklyn, New York. Leonard Moody was a Pittston native who met with financial success in the Brooklyn real estate business, and had this house built as a summer residence. The house was so large and elaborate for a modest rural community, that its construction garnered coverage from local newspapers. In 1903, the family let the house as a summer boarding house. It was sold out of the family after Leonard's death in 1905, and has since seen use as a nursing home, farmhouse, retirement home, and its present configuration with a restaurant (closed) on the ground floor and residences above.

== See also ==
- National Register of Historic Places listings in Kennebec County, Maine
