= Venus Castina =

Epithet of the Roman goddess Venus

Venus Castina ('Chaste Venus') from Latin castus, is claimed to be an epithet of the Roman goddess Venus; in this form, she was supposedly associated with "the yearnings of feminine souls locked up in male bodies".

Cesare Lombroso wrote that at Rome, the Venus of the sodomites received the title of Castina. Although no evidence of the epithet appears to exist prior to the 19th century, Clarence Joseph Bulliet wrote a book about homosexuality and cross-dressing named after this supposed epithet. In the book, he ascribes the influence of "the effeminate" to a range of activities.

The priest of the gods, from history's dawn in Asia and Egypt down to the richly-robed Roman prelates of today, have set themselves conspicuously apart from their fellow males by the assumption of female attire.

The chaste Venus, or, to use another expression, the triumphant, sacred virgin, shared the characteristics of the unconquered and the invincible Diana. Diana when seen in her nakedness, and therefore made profane, could wreak cures or other terrible retribution, such as that inflicted on Actaeon who was torn to pieces by the avenging demons in the shape of his own hounds. The chaste Venus (if the idea of Venus is ever that of chastity) was the "Venus Urania", or the Venus of the stars, or of heaven.

== See also ==
- Venus Barbata
