= Gardner's Art Through the Ages =

American textbook on the history of art

Gardner's Art through The Ages

Gardner's Art through the Ages is an American textbook on the history of art, with the 2004 edition by Fred S. Kleiner and Christin J. Mamiya. The 2001 edition was awarded both a McGuffey award for longevity and the "Texty" Award for current editions by the Text and Academic Authors Association. No other book has received both awards in the same year.

The first edition published in 1926 was written by Helen Gardner. It, like all following editions, was organized chronologically beginning with "The Birth of Art" in the Upper Paleolithic and progressing in a mainly chronological sequence to the contemporary period.

Gardner's initial edition was ahead of its time in that along with the Western canon of European art, it examined the art of India, Aboriginal America, China, and Japan. This approach was maintained for the first three editions that were all edited by Helen Gardner. The second edition was published in 1936 and the 3rd came out in 1948, a year after Gardner died. In 1959, the fourth edition was published under the editorship of Sumner McK. Crosby by the Department of the History of Art at Yale University. This edition introduced readers to a new term "non-European art." It also moved away from Gardner's interest in drawing comparisons between art from different parts of the world. In the Preface, Crosby states:

Although Miss Gardner's organization of the Third Edition provided many opportunities for interesting comparisons and made it possible to study in adjacent chapters what was occurring in different parts of the world during more or less the same historic periods, this organization often obscured the intrinsic qualities and especially the development of the different styles. As our table of contents indicates, we have presented the arts of different periods and countries in a more normal order. The division into Ancient, European, Non-European, and Modern Art and the grouping by periods and countries under these divisions will, we believe, provide a clear and coherent chronological account of the history of art throughout the world.

Sumner's organization continues to be used in editions of Gardner's. The book has remained a required text for introductory classes in art history for American students into the 21st century.

== Formats ==
The book is now published in a number of different formats, with a "concise" version, and the Western and non-Western sections available separately. There are also "enhanced" editions with additional multimedia material, and versions in one to four volumes. According to the US publisher, Cengage, the following were available in 2010:

- Gardner's Art through the Ages, 12th Edition
- Gardner's Art through the Ages: A Global History, 13th Edition
- Gardner's Art through the Ages: A Global History, Volume I, 13th Edition
- Gardner's Art through the Ages: A Global History, Volume II, 13th Edition
- Gardner's Art through the Ages: A Global History, Enhanced Edition (with ArtStudy Online and Timeline), 13th Edition
- Gardner's Art through the Ages: A Global History, Enhanced Edition, Volume I (with ArtStudy Online and Timeline), 13th Edition
- Gardner's Art through the Ages: A Global History, Enhanced Edition, Volume II (with ArtStudy Online and Timeline), 13th Edition
- Gardner's Art through the Ages: 4 Volume Backpack Edition, 13th Edition
- Gardner's Art through the Ages: Backpack Edition, Book A, Antiquity, 13th Edition
- Gardner's Art through the Ages: Backpack Edition, Book B, The Middle Ages, 13th Edition
- Gardner's Art through the Ages: Backpack Edition, Book C, Renaissance and Baroque, 13th Edition
- Gardner's Art through the Ages: Backpack Edition, Book D, Modern Europe and America, 13th Edition
- Gardner's Art through the Ages: Non-Western Perspectives, 13th Edition
- Gardner's Art through the Ages: The Western Perspective, 13th Edition
- Gardner's Art through the Ages: The Western Perspective, Volume I, 13th Edition
- Gardner's Art through the Ages: The Western Perspective, Volume II, 13th Edition
- Gardner's Art Through the Ages: A Concise Global History, 2nd Edition
- Gardner's Art through the Ages: A Concise History of Western Art, 2nd Edition
