= Venus Barbata =

Epithet of the goddess Venus

Venus Barbata ('Bearded Venus') was an epithet of the goddess Venus among the Romans. Macrobius also mentions a statue of Venus in Cyprus, representing the goddess with a beard, in female attire, but resembling in her whole figure that of a man (see also Aphroditus). The idea of Venus thus being a mixture of the male and female nature seems to belong to a very late period of antiquity.

The idea of Venus having a double-sexed nature has the same double meaning, in the mythological sense, that there is not only a Luna, but also a Lunus. The name Venus in itself, is masculine in its termination, and it was perceived that the goddess becomes the god and the god the goddess sometimes.

== See also ==
- Venus Castina
