= Pauline Palmer =

American artist

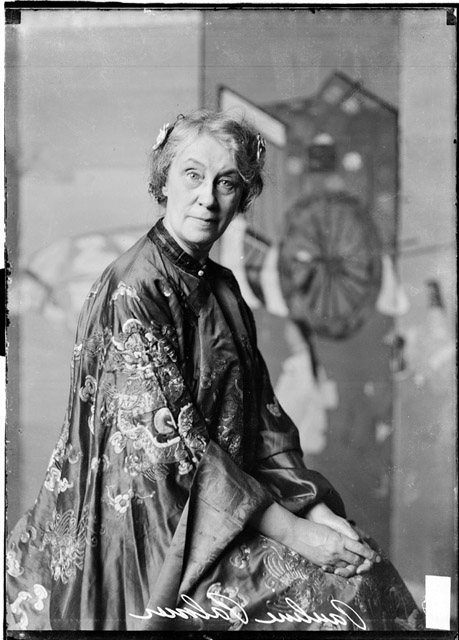
Pauline Palmer, photographed in 1918.

Pauline Lennards Palmer (1867 - August 15, 1938) was an American artist based in Chicago.

== Early life ==
Pauline Lennards was born in McHenry, Illinois, the daughter of Nicholas Lennards, a merchant, and Frances Spanganacher Lennards. Her parents were both immigrants from Prussia; she grew up speaking German as her first language. She studied art at the Art Institute of Chicago, under William Merritt Chase, Frank Duveneck, and Kenneth Hayes Miller. She pursued further training in Paris at Académie Colarossi, the Académie de la Grande Chaumière, and with Paris-based American painter Richard E. Miller.

== Career ==
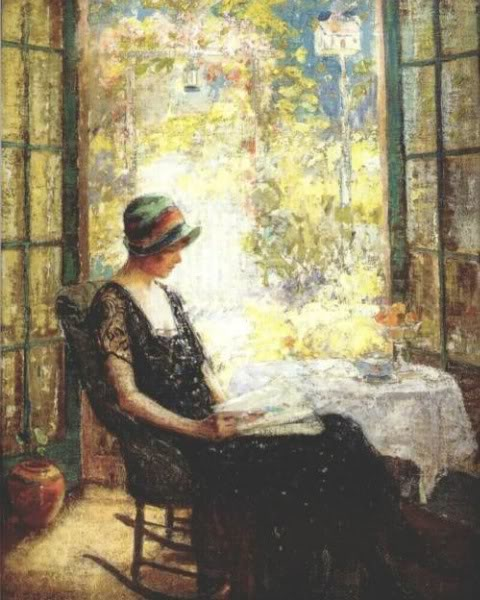
Pauline Palmer, From My Studio Window (circa 1910)

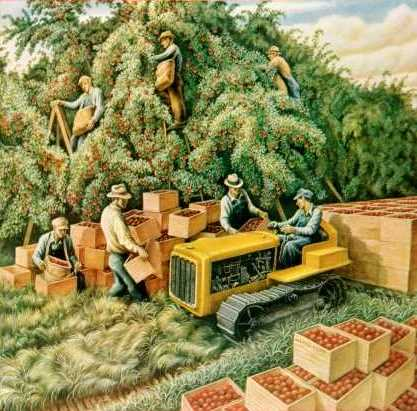
Pauline Palmer, Apple Pickers (circa 1930)

Palmer kept a studio at the Tree Building in Chicago, and exhibited paintings in many cities in the United States. Abroad, she showed works at the Paris Salon in 1903, 1904, 1905, 1906 and 1911, and also at an art exposition in Naples in 1911.

In 1919, Palmer became the first woman to be elected president of the Chicago Society of Artists. The following year, she was awarded a silver medal by the Society. She was also active with the Chicago Watercolor Club, the Chicago Art Guild, the Chicago Arts Club, and the Municipal Art League, among other affiliations. In 1923 she was founder and first president of the Association of Chicago Painters and Sculptors, and the Association awarded her a gold medal in 1936. She also served a term as president of the Art Institute Alumni Association.

== Personal life ==
Pauline Lennards married Dr. Albert E. Palmer in 1891. She was widowed when he died in 1920. In 1938, she was traveling with her sister, Mal Lennards, in Trondheim, Norway when both women fell ill, and Pauline Palmer died from pneumonia, aged 71 years. There was a memorial exhibit of her paintings in 1950 at the Chicago Galleries Association.

Works by Palmer are in the collections of the Provincetown Art Association and Museum, and the San Diego Museum of Art, among others.
