= C. J. Bulliet =

American journalist

- Born: March 16, 1883
- Died: October 20, 1952
- Education: Indiana University Bloomington
- Occupations: Journalist, writer, theatre critic, art critic

Clarence Joseph Bulliet (March 16, 1883 – October 20, 1952) was an American art critic and author.

== Biography ==
Bulliet grew up in Corydon, Indiana and graduated in 1904 from Indiana University Bloomington.

For nine years he pursued a journalism career in the city of Indianapolis. When Robert Mantell, the head of a Shakespearean touring theatre company, remarked that he liked Bulliet's theater reviews, Bulliet offered to become his press agent. Bulliet traveled in advance of the company throughout the United States and Canada during a period of nine years, except for one year when he was a regional publicist for D. W. Griffith's silent film The Birth of a Nation (1915). After a brief return to newspaper journalism in Louisville, Kentucky, Bulliet moved to Chicago to edit Magazine of the Art World, a weekly periodical published by the Chicago Evening Post. Art criticism remained his primary occupation even after the Post was assimilated by the Chicago Daily News in 1932.

Bulliet played a role in popularizing of modern art in the Midwestern United States, and in organizing Chicago's independent artists, who felt snubbed by the conservative tastes that dominated the Chicago Art Institute.

=== Personal life ===
He was married to southern Indiana artist Katherine Adams Bulliet; they had one son, Leander Jackson. After the death of his first wife in 1947 he married Catherine Girdler Bulliet. C. J. Bulliet is the grandfather of Columbia University historian Richard Bulliet.

For a time his lover was the painter Macena Barton, who once challenged his assertion that no woman had ever painted a worthwhile nude.

== Books ==
- Robert Mantell's Romance (1918)
- Apples and Madonnas (1927) is an introduction to modern art.
- Venus Castina (1928) explores the topic of female impersonation.
- The Courtesan Olympia: An Intimate Survey of Artists and their Mistress-Models (1930)
- Art Masterpieces of the 1933 Worlds Fair Exhibited at the Art Institute of Chicago (1933)
- The Significant Moderns and Their Pictures (1936)

== See also ==
- List of critics
- List of people from Indiana
