= John W. Norton =

American artist (1876–1934)

John Warner Norton
- Born: March 7, 1876; Lockport, Illinois
- Died: January 7, 1934 (aged 57); Charleston, South Carolina
- Education: Harvard University, Art Institute of Chicago
- Known for: Painter and muralist
- Parents: John Lyman Norton (father); Ada Clara Gooding Norton (mother)

John Warner Norton (7 March 1876 – 7 January 1934) was an American painter and muralist who pioneered the field in the United States.

Norton was born in Lockport, Illinois, the son of John Lyman Norton and Ada Clara Gooding Norton. The family ran the Norton & Co. of Lockport. Norton's study of law at Harvard University was broken off when the family's firm went bankrupt. Before, and after a period of living as a cowboy and enlisting with the Rough Riders, he studied art at the Art Institute of Chicago (1897, 1899–1901); he would later teach there. His students included Frances Badger. He was influenced by the Armory Show and the Japanese printmaker Katsushika Hokusai.

Among his works are the landmark 1929 180-foot (55 m) long ceiling mural for the concourse of the old Chicago Daily News Building (mural not currently installed in this building, which has been renamed Riverside Plaza; designed by architects Holabird & Root, 1929); the Ceres mural in the Chicago Board of Trade Building (Holabird & Root, 1930); two large murals, "Old South" and "New South" commissioned by Holabird & Root for the Jefferson County Courthouse in Birmingham, Alabama; his Tavern Club murals at the 333 North Michigan Ave. building, Chicago (Holabird & Root, 1928); his American Heritage Series at the Hamilton Park Field House, 513 W. 72nd St., Chicago; four murals at the St. Paul, Minnesota city hall; twelve murals comprising The History of Mankind (1923) at the Logan Museum of Anthropology at Beloit College, in Wisconsin; and his first major mural in Chicago's Cliff Dwellers Club (1909), where he was a founding member.

Norton was married and had a son and two daughters. At the time of his death on January 7, 1934, in Charleston, South Carolina of cancer, he was a popular and respected artist.

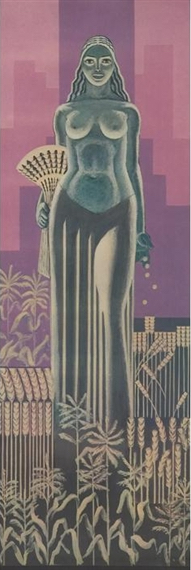
Ceres (1930)

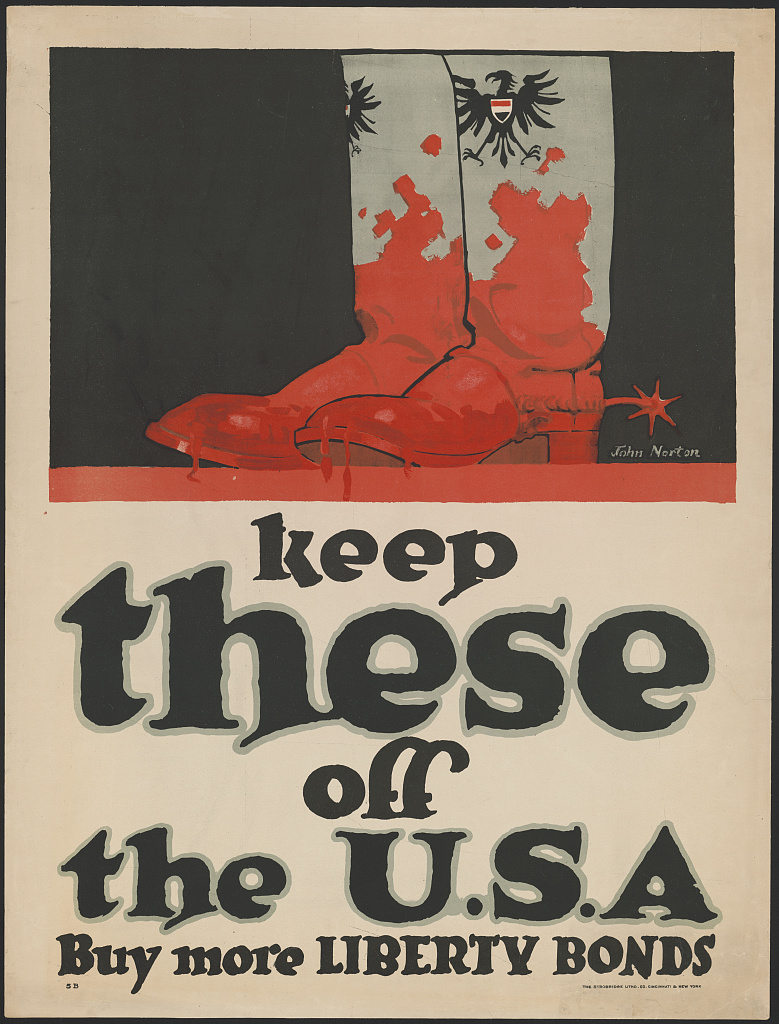
"Keep these off the U.S.A", World War I Liberty Bonds poster

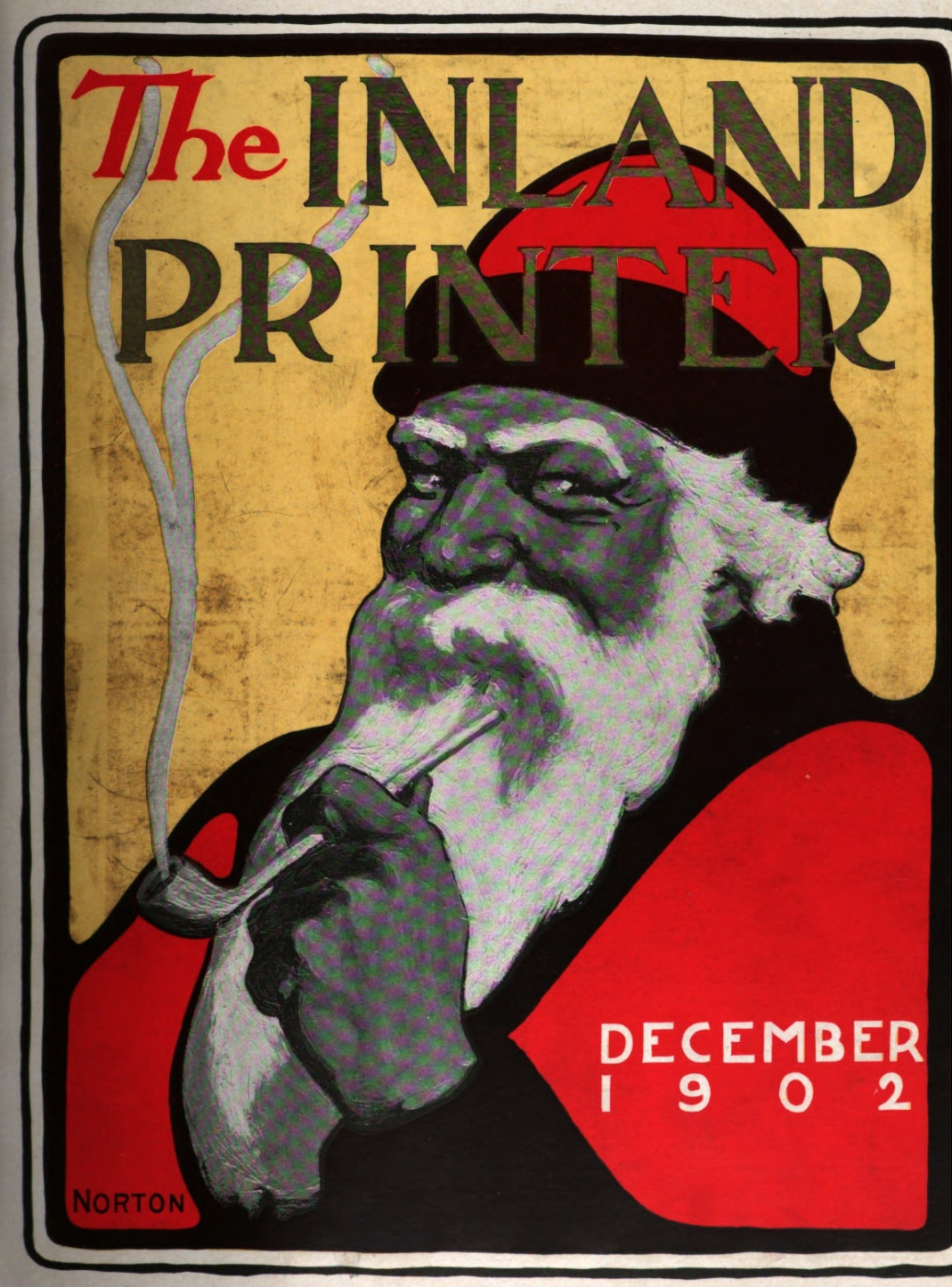
December 1902 cover of The Inland Printer magazine

== Honors ==
- William M. R. French memorial Gold Medal (1924)
- Norman Waite Harris Bronze Medal (1926)
- honorary Master of Fine Arts from the Art Institute of Chicago
- Gold Medal of Honor for Mural Painting from the Architectural League of New York (1931), for his paintings in the Tavern Club in Chicago.
