= List of painters in the Art Institute of Chicago =

The List of painters in the Art Institute of Chicago is a list of the artists indexed in the Art Institute of Chicago website whose works in their collection were painted. The museum's collections are spread throughout eight buildings in Chicago, and not all works are on display. The entire collection houses over 300,000 objects, thousands of which are on view at any given time, and only 2,382 of these are paintings. In the following list, the painter's name is followed by the number of their paintings in the collection, with a link to all of their works available on the Artic website. For artists with more than one type of work in the collection, or for works by artists not listed here, see the Artic website or the corresponding Wikimedia Commons category. Of artists listed, less than 10% are women. For the complete list of artists and their artworks in the collection, see the website.

== A ==
- Gertrude Abercrombie (1909–1977), 5 paintings : Artic
- Robert William Addison (1924–1988), 1 painting : Artic
- Nicholas Africano (born 1948), 1 painting : Artic
- Francesco Albani (1578–1660), 1 painting : Artic
- Josef Albers (1888–1976), 4 paintings : Artic
- Adam Emory Albright (1862–1957), 1 painting : Artic
- Ivan Albright (1897–1983), 44 paintings : Artic
- Cosmo Alexander (1724–1772), 1 painting : Artic
- John White Alexander (1856–1915), 1 painting : Artic
- Alessandro Allori (1535–1607), 1 painting : Artic
- Francis Alÿs (born 1959), 1 painting : Artic
- Ghada Amer (born 1963), 1 painting : Artic
- Ezra Ames (1768–1836), 1 painting : Artic
- Jacopo Amigoni (1682–1752), 1 painting : Artic
- Andrea del Sarto (1486–1530), 1 painting : Artic
- Benny Andrews (1930–2006), 1 painting : Artic
- Albert André (1869–1954), 1 painting : Artic
- Fra Angelico (1387–1455), 1 painting : Artic
- Master of the Antwerp Adoration (1480–1520), 2 paintings : Artic
- Richard Anuszkiewicz (1930–2020), 1 painting : Artic
- Apollonio di Giovanni di Tommaso (c. 1414–1465), 2 paintings : Artic
- Shusaku Arakawa (1936–2010), 1 painting : Artic
- Emil Armin (1883–1971), 2 paintings : Artic
- François Arnal (1924–2012), 1 painting : Artic
- Ralph Arnold (1928–2006), 1 painting : Artic
- David Aronson (1923–2015), 1 painting : Artic
- William Artaud (1763–1823), 1 painting : Artic
- Richard Artschwager (1923–2013), 1 painting : Artic
- John Woodhouse Audubon (1812–1862), 1 painting : Artic
- Jules Robert Auguste (1723–1805), 1 painting : Artic
- Milton Avery (1885–1965), 3 paintings : Artic

== B ==
- Francis Bacon (artist) (1909–1992), 1 painting (Figure with Meat): Artic
- Jo Baer (1929-2025), 1 painting : Artic
- Giovanni Baglione (1566–1643), 1 painting : Artic
- William Bailey (1930–2020), 1 painting : Artic
- Enrico Baj (1924–2003), 1 painting : Artic
- Balthus (1908–2001), 2 paintings : Artic
- Paolo Antonio Barbieri (1603–1649), 1 painting : Artic
- Will Barnet (1911–2012), 1 painting : Artic
- Frederic Clay Bartlett (1873–1953), 1 painting : Artic
- Bartolomeo di Giovanni (1480–1510), 1 painting : Artic
- Fra Bartolomeo (1472–1517), 1 painting : Artic
- Neroccio di Bartolomeo de' Landi (1447–1500), 1 painting : Artic
- Basawan (active 1580–1600), 1 painting : Artic
- Georg Baselitz (born 1938), 1 painting : Artic
- Jacopo Bassano (1510–1592), 3 paintings : Artic
- David Bates (English artist) (1840–1921), 1 painting : Artic
- Pompeo Batoni (1708–1787), 4 paintings : Artic
- Francisco Bayeu y Subias (1734–1795), 1 painting : Artic
- Frédéric Bazille (1841–1870), 2 paintings : Artic
- William Baziotes (1912–1963), 1 painting : Artic
- Gifford Beal (1879–1956), 2 paintings : Artic
- Cecilia Beaux (1855–1942), 1 painting : Artic
- Domenico di Pace Beccafumi (1484–1551), 1 painting : Artic
- Max Beckmann (1884–1950), 2 paintings : Artic
- William Beechey (1753–1839), 1 painting : Artic
- Édouard Béliard (1832–1902), 1 painting : Artic
- Hippolyte Bellangé (1800–1866), 1 painting : Artic
- Jehan Bellegambe (c. 1470 – c. 1535), 2 paintings : Artic
- Gentile Bellini (1430–1507), 1 painting : Artic
- Giovanni Bellini (1435–1516), 1 painting : Artic
- Bernardo Bellotto (1720–1780), 1 painting : Artic
- George Bellows (1882–1925), 3 paintings : Artic
- Henry Benbridge (1744–1812), 1 painting : Artic
- Billy Al Bengston (born 1934), 1 painting : Artic
- Frank Weston Benson (1862–1951), 2 paintings : Artic
- Thomas Hart Benton (1889–1975), 1 painting : Artic
- Bartolomé Bermejo (c. 1436–1440 – c. 1498), 1 painting : Artic
- Bernard d'Agesci (1756–1829), 1 painting : Artic
- Émile Bernard (1868–1941), 1 painting : Artic
- Oscar E. Berninghaus (1874–1952), 1 painting : Artic
- Jean-Victor Bertin (1767–1842), 1 painting : Artic
- Nicolas Bertin (1668–1736), 1 painting : Artic
- Paul-Albert Besnard (1849–1934), 1 painting : Artic
- Louis Betts (1873–1961), 3 paintings : Artic
- Joachim Beuckelaer (1533–1574), 1 painting : Artic
- Charles Biederman (1906–2004), 1 painting : Artic
- Albert Bierstadt (1830–1902), 1 painting : Artic
- Thomas Birch (1779–1851), 1 painting : Artic
- James Bishop (1927–2021), 2 paintings : Artic
- Joseph Blackburn (painter) (1700 – c. 1778), 1 painting : Artic
- Kathleen Blackshear (1897–1988), 1 painting : Artic
- Ralph Albert Blakelock (1847–1919), 2 paintings : Artic
- Jacques Blanchard (1600–1638), 1 painting : Artic
- Jacques-Émile Blanche (1861–1942), 1 painting : Artic
- Carl Blechen (1797–1840), 1 painting : Artic
- Eugène Blery (1805–1887), 1 painting : Artic
- Anna Campbell Bliss (1925–2015)
- Albert Bloch (1882–1961), 1 painting : Artic
- Hyman Bloom (1913–2009), 1 painting : Artic
- Peter Blume (1906–1992), 2 paintings : Artic
- David Gilmour Blythe (1815–1865), 1 painting : Artic
- Mel Bochner (born 1940), 1 painting : Artic
- Arnold Böcklin (1827–1901), 1 painting : Artic
- Aaron Bohrod (1907–1992), 2 paintings : Artic
- Louis-Léopold Boilly (1761–1845), 1 painting : Artic
- Giovanni Boldini (1842–1931), 1 painting : Artic
- Ilya Bolotowsky (1907–1981), 2 paintings : Artic
- Rosa Bonheur (1822–1899), 3 paintings : Artic
- Richard Parkes Bonington (1802–1828), 1 painting : Artic
- Pierre Bonnard (1867–1947), 3 paintings : Artic
- William Bonnell (1804–1865), 3 paintings : Artic
- François Bonvin (1817–1887), 1 painting : Artic
- Michael Borremans (born 1963), 1 painting : Artic
- Hieronymus Bosch (1450–1516), 1 painting : Artic
- Fernando Botero (born 1932), 1 painting : Artic
- Jan Dirksz Both (1618–1652), 1 painting : Artic
- Jessie Arms Botke (1883–1971), 1 painting : Artic
- Sandro Botticelli (1444–1510), 2 paintings : Artic
- Francesco Botticini (1446–1497), 1 painting : Artic
- Raffaello Botticini (1477–1520), 1 painting : Artic
- François Boucher (1703–1770), 1 painting : Artic
- Eugène Boudin (1824–1898), 3 paintings : Artic
- William-Adolphe Bouguereau (1825–1905), 1 painting : Artic
- Robert Bourdon (born 1947), 1 painting : Artic
- Sébastien Bourdon (1616–1671), 2 paintings : Artic
- Dieric Bouts (1415–1475), 1 painting (Christ and the Virgin Diptych): Artic
- William Bradford (painter) (1823–1892), 2 paintings : Artic
- Georges Braque (1882–1963), 7 paintings : Artic
- Victor Brauner (1903–1966), 8 paintings : Artic
- Bartholomeus Breenbergh (1598–1657), 1 painting : Artic
- Jules Breton (1827–1906), 1 painting : Artic
- Jan Brueghel the Elder (1568–1624), 1 painting : Artic
- Fidelia Bridges (1834–1924), 1 painting : Artic
- Paul Bril (1554–1626), 1 painting : Artic
- Bronzino (1503–1572), 1 painting : Artic
- Alexander Brook (1898–1980), 1 painting : Artic
- Glenn Brown (born 1966), 1 painting : Artic
- Roger Brown (1941–1997), 7 paintings : Artic
- Agostino Brunias (1730–1796), 1 painting : Artic
- Barthel Bruyn the Elder (1493–1553), 1 painting : Artic
- Barthel Bruyn the Younger (1530–1610), 1 painting : Artic
- Elbridge Ayer Burbank (1858–1949), 8 paintings : Artic
- Alberto Burri (1915–1995), 2 paintings : Artic
- Bernardino Butinone (c. 1436 – c. 1507), 2 paintings : Artic

== C ==
- Giuseppe Cades (1750–1799), 1 painting : Artic
- Cai Jai (1680–1760), 1 painting : Artic
- Cai Jiating (fl.1796–1820), 1 painting : Artic
- Gustave Caillebotte (1848–1894), 2 paintings (Paris Street; Rainy Day): Artic
- Denis Calvaert (1540–1619), 1 painting : Artic
- Luca Cambiasi (1527–1585), 1 painting : Artic
- Charles Camoin (1879–1965), 1 painting : Artic
- Heinrich Campendonk (1889–1957), 1 painting : Artic
- Canaletto (1697–1768), 2 paintings : Artic
- Ricardo Canals y Llambí (1876–1931), 1 painting : Artic
- Sarah Anne Canright (born 1941), 1 painting : Artic
- Georges Emile Capon (1890–1980), 1 painting : Artic
- Suzanne Caporael (born 1949), 1 painting : Artic
- Jan van de Cappelle (1626–1679), 1 painting : Artic
- Cecco del Caravaggio (active in the 1610s–Rome), 1 painting (Resurrection): Artic
- Arthur Beecher Carles (1882–1952), 2 paintings : Artic
- Carlo da Camerino (c. 1365 – 1439), 1 painting : Artic
- Emil Carlsen (1853–1932), 2 paintings : Artic
- Ludovico Carracci (1555–1619), 1 painting : Artic
- Leonora Carrington (1917–2011), 1 painting : Artic
- Eugène Carrière (1849–1906), 2 paintings : Artic
- Carlo Carrà (1881–1966), 1 painting : Artic
- Rodney Carswell (born 1946), 1 painting : Artic
- Mary Cassatt (1844–1926), 3 paintings (The Child's Bath): Artic
- Jean-Charles Cazin (1841–1901), 3 paintings : Artic
- Vija Celmins (born Latvia, 1938), 2 paintings : Artic
- Paul Cézanne (1839–1906), 9 paintings (The Basket of Apples;The Bathers): Artic
- Marc Chagall (1887–1985), 5 paintings (White Crucifixion): Artic
- Chai Zhenyi (17th century), 1 painting : Artic
- Charles-Émile-Callande de Champmartin (1797–1883), 1 painting : Artic
- Jean-Baptiste-Siméon Chardin (1699–1779), 1 painting : Artic
- Nicolas Toussaint Charlet (1792–1845), 1 painting : Artic
- Émilie Charmy (1878–1974), 1 painting : Artic
- William Merritt Chase (1849–1916), 4 paintings : Artic
- Chen Wu (fl.19th Century), 1 painting : Artic
- Cheng Zhengkui (c. 1604 – 1670), 1 painting : Artic
- Giorgio de Chirico (1888–1978), 3 paintings : Artic
- Varda Chryssa (1933–2013), 1 painting : Artic
- Chu Ko (born 1931), 3 paintings : Artic
- Frederic Edwin Church (1826–1900), 1 painting : Artic
- Chōbunsai Eishi (1756–1829), 3 paintings : Artic
- Ansano Ciampanti (1474–1532/35), 1 painting : Artic
- Pieter Claesz (1597–1660), 1 painting : Artic
- Alson S. Clark (1876–1949), 1 painting : Artic
- Edward Clark (1926–2019), 1 painting : Artic
- Irene Clark (born 1934), 1 painting : Artic
- Ralph Elmer Clarkson (1861–1942), 1 painting : Artic
- Francesco Clemente (born 1952), 1 painting : Artic
- Joos van Cleve (1485–1541), 2 paintings : Artic
- Chuck Close (1940–2021), 1 painting : Artic
- François Clouet (ca. 1510–1572), 1 painting : Artic
- Pieter Codde (1599–1678), 1 painting : Artic
- Eleanor Coen (1916–2010), 1 painting : Artic
- Marcellus Coffermans (1520/1530–c.1578), 1 painting : Artic
- Susanna Coffey (born 1949), 1 painting : Artic
- Thomas Cole (1801–1848), 2 paintings : Artic
- Samuel Colman (1780–1845), 1 painting : Artic
- William Conger (born 1937), 1 painting : Artic
- Brian Connelly (1926–1963), 1 painting : Artic
- Bruce Conner (1933–2008), 3 paintings : Artic
- John Constable (1776–1837), 4 paintings : Artic
- Ron Cooper (born 1943), 1 painting : Artic
- George Cope (1855–1929), 1 painting : Artic
- John Singleton Copley (1738–1815), 5 paintings : Artic
- William Copley (artist) (1919–1996), 1 painting : Artic
- Augustus Cordus (16th Century), 1 painting : Artic
- Lovis Corinth (1858–1925), 1 painting : Artic
- Corneille de Lyon (1505–1575), 2 paintings : Artic
- Jacob Cornelisz van Oostsanen (1472–1533), 2 paintings : Artic
- Michele Felice Cornè (1752–1845), 1 painting : Artic
- Jean-Baptiste-Camille Corot (1796–1875), 7 paintings : Artic
- Antonio da Correggio (1489–1534), 1 painting : Artic
- Cornelis Cort (1533–1578), 1 painting : Artic
- Eldzier Cortor (1916–2015), 2 paintings : Artic
- Colijn de Coter (1450–1532), 1 painting : Artic
- Gustave Courbet (1819–1877), 7 paintings : Artic
- Thomas Couture (1815–1879), 1 painting : Artic
- Lucas Cranach the Elder (1472–1553), 4 paintings : Artic
- Ralston Crawford (1906–1978), 1 painting : Artic
- Giuseppe Crespi (1665–1747), 2 paintings : Artic
- Carlo Crivelli (1430/35–1495), 1 painting : Artic
- Jasper Francis Cropsey (1823–1900), 2 paintings : Artic
- Henri-Edmond Cross (1856–1910), 1 painting : Artic
- William Cuming (1769–1852), 1 painting : Artic
- Charles Courtney Curran (1861–1942), 1 painting : Artic
- John Currin (born 1962), 1 painting : Artic
- John Steuart Curry (1897–1946), 1 painting : Artic
- Aelbert Cuyp (1620–1691), 1 painting : Artic

== D ==
- Pascal Dagnan-Bouveret (1852–1929), 1 painting : Artic
- Salvador Dalí (1904–1989), 7 paintings : Artic
- William Turner Dannat (1853–1929), 1 painting : Artic
- Charles-François Daubigny (1817–1878), 4 paintings : Artic
- Honoré Daumier (1808–1879), 1 painting : Artic
- Gerard David (1460–1523), 1 painting : Artic
- Jacques-Louis David (1748–1825), 2 paintings (Portrait of Madame Pastoret): Artic
- Arthur Bowen Davies (1862–1928), 5 paintings : Artic
- Jordan Davies (born 1941), 1 painting : Artic
- Charles Harold Davis (1856–1933), 1 painting : Artic
- Ronald Davis (born 1937), 3 paintings : Artic
- Stuart Davis (painter) (1894–1964), 2 paintings : Artic
- Manierre Dawson (1887–1969), 2 paintings : Artic
- Julio de Diego (1900–1979), 2 paintings : Artic
- Jay DeFeo (1929–1989), 1 painting : Artic
- Wallace Leroy DeWolf (1854–1930), 1 painting : Artic
- Alexandre-Gabriel Decamps (1803–1860), 1 painting : Artic
- Edgar Degas (1834–1917), 7 paintings (The Millinery Shop): Artic
- Eugène Delacroix (1798–1863), 6 paintings : Artic
- Beauford Delaney (1901–1979), 2 paintings : Artic
- Joseph Delaney (1904–1991), 1 painting : Artic
- Robert Delaunay (1885–1941), 1 painting (The Red Tower): Artic
- Paul Delvaux (1897–1994), 3 paintings : Artic
- Charles Demuth (1883–1935), 3 paintings : Artic
- Maurice Denis (1870–1943), 1 painting : Artic
- André Derain (1880–1954), 8 paintings : Artic
- Marcellin Desboutin (1823–1902), 1 painting : Artic
- Jean-Baptiste-Henri Deshays (1729–1765), 1 painting : Artic
- Jean-Baptiste François Desoria (1758–1832), 1 painting : Artic
- Paul Lucien Dessau, 1 painting : Artic
- Édouard Detaille (1848–1912), 1 painting : Artic
- Cesare Agostino Detti (1847–1914), 1 painting : Artic
- Arthur Devis (1712–1787) (1712–1787), 4 paintings : Artic
- Thomas Dewing (1851–1938), 1 painting : Artic
- Narcisse Virgilio Díaz (1807–1876), 2 paintings : Artic
- Imitator of Narcisse Virgilio Díaz (1807–1876), 1 painting : Artic
- Edwin Dickinson (1891–1978), 1 painting : Artic
- Preston Dickinson (1891–1930), 1 painting : Artic
- Richard Diebenkorn (1922–1993), 1 painting : Artic
- Abraham van Diepenbeeck (1596–1675), 1 painting : Artic
- Burgoyne Diller (1906–1965), 1 painting : Artic
- Jim Dine (born 1935), 1 painting : Artic
- Theo van Doesburg (1883–1931), 1 painting : Artic
- Peter Doig (born 1959), 1 painting : Artic
- Kees van Dongen (1877–1968), 1 painting : Artic
- Gustave Doré (1832–1883), 1 painting : Artic
- Thomas Doughty (artist) (1793–1856), 2 paintings : Artic
- Arthur Dove (1880–1946), 10 paintings : Artic
- Arthur Wesley Dow (1857–1922), 1 painting : Artic
- Moira Jane Dryer (1957–1992), 1 painting : Artic
- Pieter Dubordieu (1608–1688), 1 painting : Artic
- Victor Dubreuil (active 1880–1910), 1 painting : Artic
- Claude-Marie Dubufe (1790–1864), 1 painting : Artic
- Jean Dubuffet (1901–1985), 8 paintings : Artic
- Marcel Duchamp (1887–1968), 1 painting : Artic
- Suzanne Duchamp (1889–1963), 1 painting : Artic
- Charles Dufresne (1876–1938), 2 paintings : Artic
- Raoul Dufy (1877–1953), 1 painting : Artic
- Gaspard Dughet (1615–1675), 1 painting : Artic
- Marlene Dumas (born 1953), 1 painting : Artic
- Carroll Dunham (born 1949), 1 painting : Dunham Artic
- André Dunoyer de Segonzac (1884–1974), 2 paintings : Artic
- Joseph Duplessis (1725–1802), 1 painting : Artic
- Jules Dupré (1811–1889), 3 paintings : Artic
- Evert Duyckinck (c. 1620 – c. 1700), 1 painting : Artic
- Anthony van Dyck (1599–1641), 1 painting : Artic
- Charles Gifford Dyer (1846/51–1912), 1 painting : Artic

== E ==
- Thomas Eakins (1844–1916), 3 paintings (Portrait of Mary Adeline Williams): Artic
- Ralph Earl (1751–1801), 1 painting : Artic
- Christian Eckart (born 1959), 1 painting : Artic
- Christoffer Wilhelm Eckersberg (1783–1853), 1 painting : Artic
- Cecilia Edefalk (born 1954), 1 painting : Artic
- Mira Edgerly-Korzybska (1879–1954), 1 painting : Artic
- Nicole Eisenman (born 1965), 1 painting : Artic
- El Greco (1541–1614), 4 paintings (Saint Martin and the Beggar; Santo Domingo el Antiguo Altarpiece) : Artic
- Ger van Elk (1941–2014), 1 painting : Artic
- Walter Ellison (1899–1977), 1 painting : Artic
- Jacopo da Empoli (c. 1554 – 1640), 1 painting : Artic
- Enomoto Chikatoshi (1898–1973), 1 painting : Artic
- James Ensor (1860–1949), 1 painting : Artic
- Max Ernst (1891–1976), 11 paintings : Artic
- Antonio Maria Esquivel (1806–1857), 1 painting : Artic
- Richard Estes (born 1932), 4 paintings : Artic
- Agustin Esteve y Marqués (1753–1830), 1 painting : Artic
- De Scott Evans (1847–1898), 1 painting : Artic
- Philip Evergood (1901–1973), 1 painting : Artic
- Hans Eworth (1540–1573), 2 paintings : Artic

== F ==
- Conrad Faber von Kreuznach (c. 1500 – 1552/3), 1 painting : Artic
- John Falter (1910–1982), 1 painting : Artic
- Henri Fantin-Latour (1836–1904), 4 paintings : Artic
- Farrukh Chela (active c.1580 – c.1604), 1 painting : Artic
- Giovanni Antonio Fasolo (1530–1572), 1 painting : Artic
- Thomas Fearnley (1802–1842), 1 painting : Artic
- Lyonel Feininger (1871–1956), 5 paintings : Artic
- Giovanni Domenico Ferretti (1692–1768), 1 painting : Artic
- Felice Ficherelli (1603–1660), 1 painting : Artic
- Erastus Salisbury Field (1805–1900), 1 painting : Artic
- Robert Field (1769–1819), 1 painting : Artic
- Julia Fish (born 1950), 7 paintings : Artic
- Alvan Fisher (1792–1863), 1 painting : Artic
- Vernon Fisher (born 1943), 1 painting : Artic
- Louise Fishman (1939–2021), 1 painting : Artic
- Paul Flandrin (1811–1902), 1 painting : Artic
- William Russell Flint (1880–1969), 1 painting : Artic
- Frans Floris (1519–1570), 1 painting : Artic
- Jean-Louis Forain (1852–1931), 2 paintings : Artic
- James Forbes, (1797–1881) 1 painting : Artic
- Marià Fortuny (1838–1874), 2 paintings : Artic
- Tsugouharu Foujita (1886–1968), 1 painting : Artic
- Llyn Foulkes (born 1934), 1 painting : Artic
- Jean-Honoré Fragonard (1732–1806), 1 painting : Artic
- John F. Francis (1808–1886), 1 painting : Artic
- Samuel Lewis Francis (1923–1994), 2 paintings : Artic
- Helen Frankenthaler (1928–2011), 3 paintings : Artic
- Wilhelm Freddie (1909–1995), 1 painting : Artic
- Vincenzo di Antonio Frediani (active 1481–1505), 1 painting : Artic
- Lucian Freud (1922–2011), 2 paintings : Artic
- Frederick Carl Frieseke (1874–1939), 1 painting : Artic
- William Powell Frith (1819–1909), 1 painting : Artic
- Eugène Fromentin (1820–1876), 3 paintings : Artic
- Furuyama Moromasa (18th Century), 1 painting : Artic
- Henry Fuseli (1741–1825), 3 paintings : Artic
- Jan Fyt (1611–1661), 1 painting : Artic

== G ==
- Thomas Gainsborough (1727–1788), 1 painting : Artic
- Ellen Gallagher (born 1965), 1 painting (Untitled): Artic
- Gao Yang (born 1965), 1 painting : Artic
- Daniel Garber (1880–1958), 2 paintings : Artic
- Domenico Gargiulo (1609/1610 – c.1675), 1 painting : Artic
- Leon Gaspard (1882–1964), 1 painting : Artic
- Paul Gauguin (1848–1903), 9 paintings (Mahana no atua; Merahi metua no Tehamana; The Yellow Christ): Artic
- Walter Gay (1856–1937), 2 paintings : Artic
- Aert de Gelder (1645–1727), 1 painting : Artic
- Todros Geller (1889–1949), 1 painting : Artic
- General Idea (active 1967–1994), 1 painting : Artic
- Robert Genin (1884–1941), 1 painting : Artic
- François Gérard (1770–1837), 1 painting : Artic
- Gaylen Gerber (born 1955), 4 paintings : Artic
- Théodore Géricault (1791–1824), 2 paintings : Artic
- Niccolò di Pietro Gerini (active 1366 – c. 1415), 1 painting : Artic
- Jean-Léon Gérôme (1824–1904), 2 paintings : Artic
- Matthias Gerung (1500–1570), 1 painting : Artic
- Gunther Gerzso (1915–2000), 3 paintings : Artic
- Ghasi (1756–1836), 1 painting : Artic
- Ridolfo Ghirlandaio (1483–1561), 1 painting : Artic
- Francescuccio Ghissi (1359–1395), 1 painting : Artic
- Alberto Giacometti (1901–1966), 3 paintings : Artic
- Sanford Robinson Gifford (1823–1880), 4 paintings : Artic
- Gim Eung-won (1855–1921), 1 painting : Artic
- Roland Ginzel (1921–2021), 2 paintings : Artic
- Luca Giordano (1632–1705), 1 painting : Artic
- Giovanni di Paolo (1403–1482), 6 paintings : Artic
- Pedro Girard (fl.1490–1500), 1 painting : Artic
- Anne-Louis Girodet de Roussy-Trioson (1767–1824), 2 paintings : Artic
- Girolamo da Carpi (1501–1557), 1 painting : Artic
- Girolamo da Santacroce (1492–1537), 1 painting : Artic
- William Glackens (1870–1938), 1 painting : Artic
- Fritz Glarner (1899–1972), 1 painting : Artic
- Judith Godwin (1930–2021), 1 painting : Artic
- Vincent van Gogh (1853–1890), 9 paintings (Asnières;Bedroom in Arles;Cottages;Montmartre;Portraits of Vincent van Gogh;The Roulin Family;The Town Hall at Auvers): Artic
- Michael Goldberg (1924–2007), 1 painting : Artic
- Leon Golub (1922–2004), 5 paintings : Artic
- Natalia Goncharova (1881–1962), 1 painting : Artic
- Eva Gonzalès (1849–1883), 1 painting : Artic
- Antonio González Velázquez (1723–1794), 1 painting : Artic
- Ron Gorchov (1930–2020), 1 painting : Artic
- Arshile Gorky (1904–1948), 3 paintings : Artic
- Jan Gossaert (1478–1532), 1 painting : Artic
- Adolph Gottlieb (1903–1974), 2 paintings : Artic
- Francisco Goya (1746–1828), 11 paintings : Artic
- Jan van Goyen (1596–1656), 1 painting : Artic
- John D. Graham (1886–1961), 1 painting : Artic
- Art Green (born 1941), 1 painting : Artic
- Jean-Baptiste Greuze (1725–1805), 1 painting : Artic
- Juan Gris (1887–1927), 7 paintings : Artic
- Antoine-Jean Gros (1771–1835), 1 painting : Artic
- Oliver Dennett Grover (1861–1927), 1 painting : Artic
- Francesco Guardi (1712–1793), 4 paintings : Artic
- Giovanni Antonio Guardi (1699–1760), 1 painting : Artic
- Guercino (1591–1666), 1 painting : Artic
- O. Louis Guglielmi (1906–1956), 1 painting : Artic
- Paul Guigou (1834–1871), 1 painting : Artic
- Armand Guillaumin (1841–1927), 1 painting : Artic
- Philip Guston (1913–1980), 6 paintings : Artic
- Seymour Joseph Guy (1824–1910), 1 painting : Artic
- Robert Gwathmey (1903–1988), 1 painting : Artic

== H ==
- Walter Hahn (born 1927), 2 paintings : Artic
- Frans Hals (1582–1666), 1 painting (Portrait of a Woman in a Chair): Artic
- Gawen Hamilton (1697–1737), 1 painting : Artic
- Richard Hamilton (artist) (1922–2021), 1 painting : Artic
- Han Tianheng (born 1940), 1 painting : Artic
- Philip Hanson (born 1943), 1 painting : Artic
- Chester Harding (painter) (1792–1866), 1 painting : Artic
- Keith Haring (1958–1990), 1 painting : Artic
- William Harnett (1848–1892), 2 paintings : Artic
- Robert Bartholow Harshe (1879–1938), 1 painting : Artic
- Marsden Hartley (1877–1943), 10 paintings : Artic
- Childe Hassam (1859–1935), 5 paintings : Artic
- Richard Hawkins (born 1961), 1 painting : Artic
- Charles Webster Hawthorne (1872–1930), 2 paintings : Artic
- Martin Johnson Heade (1819–1904), 2 paintings : Artic
- George Peter Alexander Healy (1813–1894), 1 painting : Artic
- Ernest Hébert (1817–1908), 1 painting : Artic
- Al Held (1928–2005), 1 painting : Artic
- Jean Hélion (1904–1987), 1 painting : Artic
- Jan Sanders van Hemessen (1500–1575), 1 painting : Artic
- William Penhallow Henderson (1877–1943), 3 paintings : Artic
- Robert Henri (1865–1929), 3 paintings : Artic
- Edward Lamson Henry (1841–1919), 2 paintings : Artic
- Auguste Herbin (1882–1960), 2 paintings : Artic
- Eva Hesse (1936–1970), 1 painting : Artic
- John Hesselius (1728–1778), 2 paintings : Artic
- Jean Hey (1471–1500), 3 paintings : Artic
- Thomas Hicks (painter) (1823–1890), 1 painting : Artic
- William Victor Higgins (1884–1949), 1 painting : Artic
- Joseph Highmore (1692–1780), 2 paintings : Artic
- George Hitchcock (artist) (1850–1913), 2 paintings : Artic
- Meindert Hobbema (1638–1709), 2 paintings : Artic
- David Hockney (born 1937), 2 paintings : Artic
- Ferdinand Hodler (1853–1918), 4 paintings : Artic
- Margo Hoff (1910–2008), 1 painting : Artic
- Harry Leslie Hoffman (1871–1964), 1 painting : Artic
- Hans Hofmann (1880–1966), 3 paintings : Artic
- Tom Holland (artist) (born 1936), 1 painting : Artic
- Winslow Homer (1836–1910), 4 paintings : Artic
- Samuel Dirksz van Hoogstraten (1627–1678), 1 painting : Artic
- James Roy Hopkins (1877–1969), 1 painting : Artic
- Edward Hopper (1882–1967), 1 painting (Nighthawks): Artic
- German Horacio (1912–1972), 1 painting : Artic
- Charles Howard (1899–1978), 1 painting : Artic
- Thomas Hudson (painter) (1701–1779), 2 paintings : Artic
- Master Hugo (1130 – c. 1150), 1 painting : Artic
- Victor-Pierre Huguet (1835–1902), 1 painting : Artic
- Gary Hume (born 1962), 1 painting : Artic
- William Morris Hunt (1824–1879), 1 painting : Artic
- Peter Hurd (1904–1984), 1 painting : Artic
- Michael Hurson (1942–2007), 1 painting : Artic

== I ==
- Ike Taiga (1723–1776), 1 painting : Artic
- Ikeda Keisen (1863–1932), 1 painting : Artic
- Rudolph F. Ingerle (1879–1950), 1 painting : Artic
- Jean-Auguste-Dominique Ingres (1780–1867), 1 painting (Portrait of Amédée de Pastoret): Artic
- George Inness (1825–1894), 26 paintings : Artic
- Wilson Irvine (1869–1936), 1 painting : Artic
- Eugène Isabey (1803–1886), 1 painting : Artic
- Adriaen Isenbrandt (1485–1551), 1 painting : Artic
- Adriaen Isenbrandt (1485–1551), 1 painting : Artic
- Isoda Koryūsai (1735–1790), 1 painting : Artic
- Jozef Israëls (1824–1911), 1 painting : Artic
- Miyoko Ito (1918–1983), 2 paintings : Artic

== J ==
- John Jackson (painter) (1778–1831), 1 painting : Artic
- Marcel Janco (1895–1984), 1 painting : Artic
- Heinrich Jansen (1625–1667), 1 painting : Artic
- Abraham Janssens (1570–1632), 1 painting : Artic
- Alexej von Jawlensky (1864–1941), 2 paintings : Artic
- Alfred Jensen (1903–1981), 2 paintings : Artic
- Jess (1923–2004), 1 painting : Artic
- Jasper Johns (born 1930), 2 paintings : Artic
- Eastman Johnson (1824–1906), 3 paintings : Artic
- Joshua Johnson (c.1765 – after 1825), 1 painting : Artic
- Johan Jongkind (1819–1891), 3 paintings : Artic
- Jacob Jordaens (1593–1678), 1 painting : Artic

== K ==
- Kaigetsudo Doshu (active c.1715), 1 painting : Artic
- Wassily Kandinsky (1866–1944), 6 paintings (Improvisation No. 30 (Cannons)) : Artic
- Kano Motonobu (1476–1559), 1 painting : Artic
- Morris Kantor (1896–1974), 1 painting : Artic
- Georges Kars (1882–1945), 1 painting : Artic
- Katsukawa Shunchô (1783 – c. 1795), 1 painting : Artic
- Katsukawa Shunshō (1726–1793), 5 paintings : Artic
- Katsushika Hokusai (1760–1849), 1 painting : Artic
- Alex Katz (born 1927), 1 painting : Artic
- Angelica Kauffman (1741–1807), 1 painting : Artic
- On Kawara (1932–2014), 1 painting : Artic
- Imao Keinen (1845–1924), 1 painting : Artic
- Ellsworth Kelly (1923–2015), 13 paintings : Artic
- John Frederick Kensett (1816–1872), 2 paintings : Artic
- Rockwell Kent (1882–1971), 1 painting : Artic
- William Kentridge (born 1955), 1 painting : Artic
- Anselm Kiefer (born 1945), 1 painting : Artic
- Byron Kim (born 1961), 1 painting : Artic
- Ernst Ludwig Kirchner (1880–1938), 1 painting : Artic
- Kishi Ganku (1749–1839), 1 painting : Artic
- Kitao Masanobu (1761–1816), 1 painting : Artic
- Paul Klee (1879–1940), 13 paintings : Artic
- Franz Kline (1910–1962), 1 painting : Artic
- Kō Fuyō (1722–1784), 1 painting : Artic
- Johann Koerbecke (c. 1420 – 1490), 1 painting : Artic
- Oskar Kokoschka (1886–1980), 1 painting : Artic
- Kong Baiji (1932–2018), 1 painting : Artic
- Willem de Kooning (1904–1997), 3 paintings : Artic
- John Lewis Krimmel (1786–1821), 1 painting : Artic
- Leon Kroll (1884–1974), 2 paintings : Artic
- Nicholas Krushenick (1929–1999), 1 painting : Artic
- Walt Kuhn (1877–1949), 1 painting : Artic
- Guillermo Kuitca (born 1961), 2 paintings : Artic
- Leopold Kupelwieser (1796–1862), 1 painting : Artic
- František Kupka (1871–1957), 1 painting : Artic
- Yayoi Kusama (1929–2026), 1 painting : Artic

== L ==
- John LaFarge (1835–1910), 1 painting : Artic
- Laurent de La Hyre (1605–1656), 1 painting : Artic
- Gaston La Touche (1854–1913), 1 painting : Artic
- Pietro Labruzzi (1739–1805), 1 painting : Artic
- Wifredo Lam (1902–1982), 1 painting : Artic
- Lan Ying (c. 1585 – 1664), 10 paintings : Artic
- Nicolas Lancret (1690–1743), 1 painting : Artic
- Ronnie Landfield (born 1947), 1 painting : Artic
- Edwin Henry Landseer (1802–1873), 2 paintings : Artic
- Ellen Lanyon (1926–2013), 3 paintings : Artic
- Nicolas de Largillière (1656–1746), 1 painting : Artic
- Elie Lascaux (1888–1969), 1 painting : Artic
- Marie Laurencin (1883–1956), 1 painting : Artic
- Charles B. Lawrence (1790–1864), 1 painting : Artic
- Jacob Lawrence (1917–2000), 1 painting : Artic
- Thomas Lawrence (1769–1830), 3 paintings : Artic
- Ernest Lawson (1873–1939), 1 painting : Artic
- Le Corbusier (1887–1965), 3 paintings : Artic
- Henri Le Sidaner (1862–1939), 2 paintings : Artic
- Eustache Le Sueur (1616–1655), 1 painting : Artic
- James Lechay (1907–2001), 1 painting : Artic
- Judy Ledgerwood (born 1959), 1 painting : Artic
- Doris Lee (1905–1983), 1 painting : Artic
- Hughie Lee-Smith (1915–1999), 1 painting : Artic
- Jules Joseph Lefebvre (1836–1912), 1 painting : Artic
- Fernand Léger (1881–1955), 8 paintings : Artic
- Adriaan de Lelie (1755–1820), 1 painting : Artic
- Annette Lemieux (born 1957), 1 painting : Artic
- Georges Lemmen (1865–1916), 1 painting : Artic
- Franz von Lenbach (1836–1904), 1 painting : Artic
- Leng Mei (active 1677–1742), 1 painting : Artic
- Fuchs Leonhart (16th Century), 1 painting : Artic
- Stanislas Lépine (1835–1892), 4 paintings : Artic
- Julian Edwin Levi (1900–1982), 1 painting : Artic
- Jack Levine (1915–2010), 1 painting : Artic
- Sherrie Levine (born 1947), 1 painting : Artic
- Henri-Léopold Lévy (1840–1904), 1 painting : Artic
- Sol LeWitt (1928–2007, 1 painting : Artic
- Lucas van Leyden (1494–1533), 1 painting : Artic
- Léon Augustin Lhermitte (1844–1925), 1 painting : Artic
- André Lhote (1885–1962), 3 paintings : Artic
- Li Huasheng (1944–2018), 1 painting : Artic
- Li Huayi (born 1948), 2 paintings : Artic
- Li Xubai (born 1940), 1 painting : Artic
- Roy Lichtenstein (1923–1997), 3 paintings : Artic
- Jonas Lie (painter) (1880–1940), 1 painting : Artic
- Jan Lievens (1607–1674), 1 painting : Artic
- Glenn Ligon (born 1960), 1 painting : Artic
- Lin Xue (born 1968), 1 painting : Artic
- Richard Lindner (painter) (1901–1978), 1 painting : Artic
- Dirck van der Lisse (1607–1669), 1 painting : Artic
- Luigi Loir (1845–1916), 1 painting : Artic
- Gustave Loiseau (1865–1935), 2 paintings : Artic
- Alessandro Longhi (1733–1813), 1 painting : Artic
- Pietro Longhi (1702–1783), 2 paintings : Artic
- Empress Dowager of China Longyu, 1 painting : Artic
- Andrés López Polanco (died 1641), 1 painting : Artic
- Claude Lorrain (1604–1682), 1 painting : Artic
- Robert Lostutter (born 1939), 3 paintings : Artic
- Johann Carl Loth (1632–1698), 1 painting : Artic
- Morris Louis (1912–1962), 2 paintings : Artic
- Philip James de Loutherbourg (1740–1812), 1 painting : Artic
- Richard Maris Loving (1924–2021), 2 paintings : Artic
- Will Hicok Low (1853–1933), 5 paintings : Artic
- Lu Wei (born 1970), 1 painting : Artic
- Lu Zhi (c. 1496 – 1576), 1 painting : Artic
- George Luks (1867–1933), 1 painting : Artic
- Fernand Lungren (1857–1932), 1 painting : Artic
- Jean Lurçat (1892–1966), 2 paintings : Artic
- Jim Lutes (born 1955), 1 painting : Artic

== M ==
- Walter MacEwen (1860–1943), 1 painting : Artic
- Loren MacIver (1909–1998), 1 painting : Artic
- Frederick William MacMonnies (1863–1937), 1 painting : Artic
- Nicolaes Maes (1634–1693), 2 paintings : Artic
- Alessandro Magnasco (1667–1749), 2 paintings : Artic
- René Magritte (1898–1967), 4 paintings (On the Threshold of Liberty; Time Transfixed): Artic
- Hans Makart (1840–1884), 1 painting : Artic
- Edward Greene Malbone, 1 painting : Artic
- Kazimir Malevich (1878–1935), 1 painting : Artic
- Man Ray (1890–1976), 3 paintings : Artic
- Cornelis de Man (1621–1706), 1 painting : Artic
- Antonio Mancini (1852–1930), 1 painting : Artic
- Édouard Manet (1832–1883), 10 paintings (The Races at Longchamp): Artic
- Bartolomeo Manfredi (1582–1622), 1 painting : Artic
- Robert Mangold (born 1937), 2 paintings : Artic
- Peppino Mangravite (1896–1978), 1 painting : Artic
- Margherita Manzelli (born 1968), 1 painting : Artic
- Piero Manzoni (1933–1963), 1 painting : Artic
- Franz Marc (1880–1916), 1 painting : Artic
- Conrad Marca-Relli (1913–2000), 1 painting : Artic
- Émile van Marcke (1827–1890), 1 painting : Artic
- Louis Marcoussis (1878/1883–1941), 2 paintings : Artic
- Brice Marden (born 1938), 2 paintings : Artic
- Pietro Marescalchi (1522–1589), 1 painting : Artic
- Michele Marieschi (1710–1743), 1 painting : Artic
- John Marin (1870–1953), 1 painting : Artic
- Albert Marquet (1875–1947), 2 paintings : Artic
- Reginald Marsh (artist) (1898–1954), 2 paintings : Artic
- Benjamin Marshall (1768–1835), 1 painting : Artic
- Kerry James Marshall (born 1955), 6 paintings : Artic
- Agnes Martin (1912–2004), 1 painting : Artic
- Homer Dodge Martin (1836–1897), 1 painting : Artic
- John Martin (painter) (1789–1854), 1 painting : Artic
- Bernat Martorell (ca. 1400–1452), 1 painting : Artic
- Martyl Suzanne Langsdorf (1917–2013), 2 paintings : Artic
- Maryan (Pinchas Burstein) (1927–1977), 1 painting : Artic
- André Masson (1896–1987), 1 painting : Artic
- Quentin Massys (1466–1530), 1 painting : Artic
- Master Alejo, 1 painting : Artic
- Master Palanquinos, 1 painting : Artic
- Master of Apollo and Daphne (c. 1480 – 1510), 2 paintings : Artic
- Master of Riglos (active 1435–1460), 1 painting : Artic
- Master of Saint Veronica (1400–1420), 1 painting : Artic
- Master of the 1540s (1541–1551), 1 painting : Artic
- Master of the Bigallo Crucifix (fl.1215/20–1265), 1 painting : Artic
- Master of the Female Half-Lengths (1530–1540), 1 painting : Artic
- Master of the Freising Visitation, 1 painting : Artic
- Master of the Historia Friderici et Maximiliani, 1 painting : Artic
- Master of the Visitation, 1 painting : Artic
- Master of the Worcester Panel, 1 painting : Artic
- Agostino Masucci (1691–1758), 1 painting : Artic
- Georges Mathieu, 1 painting : Artic
- Henri Matisse (1869–1954), 10 paintings : Artic
- Roberto Matta (1911–2002), 6 paintings : Artic
- Matteo di Giovanni (c. 1430 – 1495), 2 paintings : Artic
- Jan Matulka (1890–1972), 1 painting : Artic
- Maxime Maufra (1861–1918), 1 painting : Artic
- Constant Mayer (1829–1911), 1 painting : Artic
- Gerald McLaughlin, 2 paintings : Artic
- John McLaughlin (artist) (1898–1976), 1 painting : Artic
- Mei Chong (17th Century), 1 painting : Artic
- Ludwig Meidner (1884–1966), 1 painting : Artic
- Jean-Louis-Ernest Meissonier (1815–1891), 1 painting : Artic
- Gari Melchers (1860–1932), 2 paintings : Artic
- Meliore di Jacopo (fl.1255–1285), 1 painting : Artic
- Hans Memling (1430–1494), 2 paintings : Artic
- Anton Raphael Mengs (1728–1779), 2 paintings : Artic
- Herman Menzel (1904–1988), 1 painting : Artic
- Mario Merz (1925–2003), 1 painting : Artic
- Sam Messer (born 1955), 1 painting : Artic
- Willard Metcalf (1858–1925), 1 painting : Artic
- Jean Metzinger (1883–1956), 4 paintings (Woman with a Fan): Artic
- Charles Alfred Meurer (1865–1955), 1 painting : Artic
- Georges Michel (painter) (1763–1843), 1 painting : Artic
- Michele Tosini (1503–1577), 1 painting : Artic
- Francesco Paolo Michetti (1851–1929), 1 painting : Artic
- Willem van Mieris (1662–1747), 1 painting : Artic
- Mihata Jôryû (fl.early 19th Century), 1 painting : Artic
- Johannes Mytens (1614–1670), 1 painting : Artic
- Manolo Millares (1926–1972), 1 painting : Artic
- Richard Emil Miller (1875–1943), 1 painting : Artic
- Jean-François Millet (1814–1875), 9 paintings : Artic
- Joan Miró (1893–1983), 9 paintings (Ciphers and Constellations, in Love with a Woman): Artic
- Joan Mitchell (1925–1992), 1 painting : Artic
- Miyagawa Chôshun, 1 painting : Artic
- Amedeo Modigliani (1884–1920), 3 paintings (Jacques and Berthe Lipchitz): Artic
- László Moholy-Nagy (1895–1946), 2 paintings : Artic
- Louise Moillon (1609–1696), 1 painting : Artic
- Antonio Molleno (?–1845), 1 painting : Artic
- Joos de Momper (1564–1635), 3 paintings : Artic
- Lorenzo Monaco (1370–1423), 1 painting : Artic
- Piet Mondrian (1872–1944), 3 paintings : Artic
- Claude Monet (1840–1926), 33 paintings (Arrival of the Normandy Train, Gare Saint-Lazare; Charing Cross Bridge; Haystacks; The Cliff Walk at Pourville;Water Lilies): Artic
- Adolphe Joseph Thomas Monticelli (1824–1886), 7 paintings : Artic
- Antonis Mor (1520–1576), 2 paintings : Artic
- Giorgio Morandi (1890–1964), 1 painting : Artic
- Gustave Moreau (1826–1898), 1 painting : Artic
- Paulus Moreelse (1571–1638), 1 painting : Artic
- Domenico Morelli (1823–1901), 1 painting : Artic
- Moretto da Brescia (c. 1498 – 1554), 1 painting : Artic
- Aleksei Morgunov (1884–1935), 1 painting : Artic
- Berthe Morisot (1841–1895), 4 paintings : Artic
- George Morland (1763–1804), 1 painting : Artic
- Giovanni Battista Moroni (1525–1578), 1 painting : Artic
- George Lovett Kingsland Morris (1905–1975), 1 painting : Artic
- Keith Morrison (born 1942), 1 painting : Artic
- Edward Moses (1926–2018), 2 paintings : Artic
- Grandma Moses (1860–1961), 1 painting : Artic
- Robert Motherwell (1915–1991), 1 painting : Artic
- Archibald Motley (1891–1981), 2 paintings : Artic
- Shepard Alonzo Mount (1804–1868), 1 painting : Artic
- William Sidney Mount (1807–1868), 1 painting : Artic
- George Ludwig Mueller (born 1929), 2 paintings : Artic
- Mughal, 19 paintings : Artic
- Charles Louis Muller (1815–1892), 1 painting : Artic
- Edvard Munch (1863–1944), 1 painting : Artic
- Gabriele Münter (1877–1962), 1 painting : Artic
- Francesco de Mura (1696–1782), 1 painting : Artic
- Bartolomé Esteban Murillo (1617–1682), 1 painting : Artic
- Hermann Dudley Murphy (1867–1945), 1 painting : Artic
- Elizabeth Murray (artist) (1940–2007), 1 painting : Artic
- Jerome Myers (1867–1940), 1 painting : Artic

== N ==
- Nakamura Daizaburō (1898–1947), 1 painting : Artic
- John Neagle (1796–1865), 1 painting : Artic
- David Dalhoff Neal (1838–1915), 1 painting : Artic
- Alice Neel (1900–1984), 1 painting : Artic
- Eglon van der Neer (1634–1703), 1 painting : Artic
- Caspar Netscher (1639–1684), 2 paintings : Artic
- Barnett Newman (1905–1970), 2 paintings : Artic
- Ben Nicholson (1894–1982), 3 paintings : Artic
- Gladys Nilsson (born 1940), 1 painting : Artic
- Noguchi Shohin (1847–1917), 1 painting : Artic
- Isamu Noguchi (1904–1988), 1 painting : Artic
- Kenneth Noland (1924–2010), 4 paintings : Artic
- Emil Nolde (1867–1956), 2 paintings : Artic
- James Northcote (1746–1831), 1 painting : Artic
- John Warner Norton (1876–1934), 1 painting : Artic
- Jim Nutt (born 1938), 2 paintings : Artic
- Allegretto Nuzi (c. 1315 – 1373), 1 painting : Artic
- Arvid Nyholm (1866–1927), 1 painting : Artic

== O ==
- Georgia O'Keeffe (1887–1986), 19 paintings (Blue and Green Music): Artic
- Jacob Ochtervelt (1634–1682), 1 painting : Artic
- Ogata Korin (1658–1716), 1 painting : Artic
- Kenzo Okada (1902–1982), 1 painting : Artic
- Ôkura Jirô (1942–2014), 1 painting : Artic
- Jules Olitski (1922–2007), 2 paintings : Artic
- Omura Koyo (1891–1983), 1 painting : Artic
- Marcel Ordinaire (1848–1896), 1 painting : Artic
- Bernard van Orley (1490–1541), 1 painting : Artic
- José Clemente Orozco (1883–1949), 1 painting : Artic
- Adriaen van Ostade (1610–1685), 1 painting : Artic
- Jean-Baptiste Oudry (1686–1755), 1 painting : Artic
- Laura Owens (born 1970), 1 painting : Artic
- Amédée Ozenfant (1886–1966), 1 painting : Artic

== P ==
- Franz Xaver Palko (1724–1767), 1 painting : Artic
- Palma il Giovane (1546–1628), 1 painting : Artic
- Paolo Veneziano (before 1300 – ca 1360), 2 paintings : Artic
- Joseph Parker (1930–2009), 1 painting : Artic
- Ray Parker (1922–1990), 1 painting : Artic
- Ed Paschke (1939–2004), 4 paintings : Artic
- Pascin (1885–1930), 2 paintings : Artic
- Alberto Pasini (1826–1899), 1 painting : Artic
- Jean-Baptiste Pater (1695–1736), 1 painting : Artic
- Joachim Patinir (c. 1480 – 1524), 1 painting : Artic
- Anna Claypoole Peale (1791–1878), 1 painting : Artic
- Charles Willson Peale (1741–1827), 2 paintings : Artic
- James Peale (1749–1831), 1 painting : Artic
- Raphaelle Peale (1774–1825), 1 painting : Artic
- Rembrandt Peale (1778–1860), 2 paintings : Artic
- Philip Pearlstein (1924–2022), 1 painting : Artic
- Max Pechstein (1881–1955), 1 painting : Artic
- Sheldon Peck (1797–1868), 2 paintings : Artic
- John Ritto Penniman (1782–1841), 1 painting : Artic
- Irene Rice Pereira (1902–1971), 1 painting : Artic
- Léon Bazille Perrault (1832–1908), 1 painting : Artic
- Pietro Perugino (1446–1523), 4 paintings : Artic
- Jean-Baptiste Pater (1695–1736), 1 painting : Artic
- Irving Petlin (1934–2018), 3 paintings : Artic
- John Frederick Peto (1854–1907), 1 painting : Artic
- Ernest Christian Frederik Petzholdt (1805–1838), 1 painting : Artic
- Frank Charles Peyraud (1856/58–1948), 1 painting : Artic
- Ammi Phillips (1788–1865), 2 paintings : Artic
- Francis Piatek (born 1944), 2 paintings : Artic
- Giovanni Battista Piazzetta (1682–1754), 2 paintings : Artic
- Francis Picabia (1879–1953), 3 paintings : Artic
- Pablo Picasso (1881–1973), 17 paintings (Portrait of Daniel-Henry Kahnweiler; The Old Guitarist): Artic
- Piero di Cosimo (1462–1521), 1 painting : Artic
- Evert Pieters (1856–1932), 1 painting : Artic
- Horace Pippin (1888–1946), 1 painting : Artic
- Camille Pissarro (1830–1903), 11 paintings : Artic
- Lari Pittman (born 1952), 1 painting : Artic
- Angel Planells (1901–1989), 1 painting : Artic
- Johann Georg Platzer (1704–1761), 2 paintings : Artic
- Sylvia Plimack Mangold (born 1938), 1 painting : Artic
- Serge Poliakoff (1906–1969), 1 painting : Artic
- Sigmar Polke (1941–2012), 1 painting : Artic
- Jackson Pollock (1912–1956), 3 paintings : Artic
- Pontormo (1494–1556), 1 painting : Artic
- Abram Poole (1882/83–1961), 1 painting : Artic
- Larry Poons (born 1937), 4 paintings : Artic
- Paulus Potter (1625–1654), 1 painting : Artic
- Edward Henry Potthast (1857–1927), 1 painting : Artic
- Frans Pourbus the younger (1569–1622), 1 painting : Artic
- Nicolas Poussin (1594–1665), 1 painting : Artic
- Sir Edward Poynter, 1st Baronet (1836–1919), 2 paintings : Artic
- Stefano Pozzi (1699–1768), 3 paintings : Artic
- Charles Poerson (1609–1667), 1 painting : Artic
- Charles Prendergast (1863–1948), 1 painting : Artic
- Gregorio Prestopino (1907–1984), 1 painting : Artic
- Mattia Preti (1613–1699), 1 painting : Artic
- William Matthew Prior (1806–1873), 2 paintings : Artic
- Giulio Cesare Procaccini (1574–1625), 1 painting : Artic
- Pierre-Paul Prud'hon (1758–1823), 1 painting : Artic
- Pedro Pruna (1904–1977), 1 painting : Artic
- James Ferrier Pryde (1866–1941), 1 painting : Artic
- Antonio Puga (1602–1648), 1 painting : Artic
- Pierre Puvis de Chavannes (1824–1898), 3 paintings : Artic

== Q ==
- Qian Daxin (1728–1804), 1 painting : Artic
- Qiu Ying (1494–1557), 1 painting : Artic
- John Quidor (1801–1881), 1 painting : Artic

== R ==
- Henry Raeburn (1756–1823), 3 paintings : Artic
- Michael Raedecker (born 1963), 1 painting : Artic
- Joseph Raffael (1933–2021), 2 paintings : Artic
- Jean-François Raffaëlli (1850–1924), 2 paintings : Artic
- John Ramage (c. 1748 – 1802), 1 painting : Artic
- Christina Ramberg (1946–1995), 3 paintings : Artic
- Henry Ward Ranger (1858–1916), 1 painting : Artic
- John Rathbone (1750–1807), 2 paintings : Artic
- Abraham Rattner (1893–1978), 1 painting : Artic
- Robert Rauschenberg (1925–2008), 1 painting : Artic
- Carducius Plantagenet Ream (1838–1917), 1 painting : Artic
- Edward Willis Redfield (1869–1965), 1 painting : Artic
- Odilon Redon (1840–1916), 3 paintings : Artic
- Henri Regnault (1843–1871), 2 paintings : Artic
- Jean-Baptiste Regnault (1754–1829), 1 painting : Artic
- Ad Reinhardt (1913–1967), 2 paintings : Artic
- Heinrich Reinhold (1788–1825), 1 painting : Artic
- Deborah Remington (1930–2010), 1 painting : Artic
- Frederic Remington (1861–1909), 17 paintings : Artic
- Ren Yi (1840–1896), 8 paintings : Artic
- Guido Reni (1575–1642), 1 painting : Artic
- Pierre-Auguste Renoir (1841–1919), 15 paintings (Lunch at the Restaurant Fournaise;Two Sisters (On the Terrace)) : Artic
- Jean Restout (1692–1768), 1 painting : Artic
- Joshua Reynolds (1723–1792), 2 paintings : Artic
- Jusepe de Ribera (1590–1656), 1 painting : Artic
- Augustin Théodule Ribot (1823–1891), 2 paintings : Artic
- Sebastiano Ricci (1659–1734), 1 painting : Artic
- William Trost Richards (1833–1905), 1 painting : Artic
- Jonathan Richardson (1667–1745), 1 painting : Artic
- Adrian Ludwig Richter (1803–1884), 1 painting : Artic
- Gerhard Richter (born 1932), 12 paintings : Artic
- Martín Rico y Ortega (1833–1908), 1 painting : Artic
- Rembrandt (1606–1669), 1 painting (Old Man with a Gold Chain) : Artic
- Bridget Riley (born 1931), 1 painting : Artic
- Antonio Rimpatta (fl.1500–1530), 1 painting : Artic
- Jean-Paul Riopelle (1923–2002), 2 paintings : Artic
- Diego Rivera (1886–1957), 3 paintings : Artic
- Larry Rivers (1923–2002), 1 painting : Artic
- Hubert Robert (1733–1808), 4 paintings : Artic
- Ercole de' Roberti (1450–1469), 1 painting : Artic
- Theodore Robinson (1852–1896), 1 painting : Artic
- Norman Rockwell (1894-1978), 1 painting
- Severin Roesen (1848–1872), 1 painting : Artic
- Pieter Gerritsz van Roestraten (1630–1700), 1 painting : Artic
- Giovanni Romagnoli (1893–1976), 1 painting : Artic
- George Romney (1734–1802), 1 painting : Artic
- Salvator Rosa (1615–1673), 2 paintings : Artic
- Kay Rosen (born 1944), 7 paintings : Artic
- James Rosenquist (1933–2017), 1 painting : Artic
- Toby Edward Rosenthal (1848–1917), 1 painting : Artic
- Seymour Rosofsky (1924–1981), 3 paintings : Artic
- Dante Gabriel Rossetti (1828–1882), 1 painting (Beata Beatrix): Artic
- Barbara Rossi (born 1940), 2 paintings : Artic
- Mark Rothko (1903–1970), 3 paintings : Artic
- Johann Michael Rottmayr (1656–1730), 5 paintings : Artic
- Georges Rouault (1871–1958), 5 paintings : Artic
- Henri Rousseau (1844–1910), 3 paintings : Artic
- Théodore Rousseau (1812–1867), 5 paintings : Artic
- Ker Xavier Roussel (1867–1944), 1 painting : Artic
- Pierre Roy (1880–1959), 1 painting : Artic
- Peter Paul Rubens (1577–1640), 7 paintings : Artic
- Jacob Isaacksz van Ruisdael (1628–1682), 1 painting : Artic
- Edward Ruscha (born 1937), 2 paintings : Artic
- Hesheli Rushan (active 1850–1899), 1 painting : Artic
- John Russell (painter) (1745–1806), 1 painting : Artic
- Albert Pinkham Ryder (1847–1917), 1 painting : Artic
- Robert Ryman (1930–2019), 5 paintings : Artic

== S ==
- Cornelis Saftleven (1607–1681), 1 painting : Artic
- Kay Sage (1898–1963), 1 painting : Artic
- David Salle (born 1952), 1 painting : Artic
- Bartolommeo Salvestrini (died 1630), 1 painting : Artic
- Alonso Sánchez Coello (1531–1588), 1 painting : Artic
- Juan Sánchez Cotán (c. 1560 – 1627), 1 painting : Artic
- Sano di Pietro (1405/1406–1481), 1 painting : Artic
- Jean-Baptiste Santerre (1658–1717), 1 painting : Artic
- John Singer Sargent (1856–1925), 13 paintings : Artic
- Paul Sarkisian (1928–2019), 1 painting : Artic
- Andrea del Sarto (1486–1530), 1 painting : Artic
- Peter Saul (born 1934), 1 painting : Artic
- Edward Savage (artist) (1761–1817), 1 painting : Artic
- Girolamo Savoldo (c. 1480 – c. 1548), 1 painting : Artic
- Martin Schaffner (1477/78–1549), 1 painting : Artic
- Ary Scheffer (1795–1858), 1 painting : Artic
- Albert Schindler (1805–1861), 1 painting : Artic
- Karl Schmidt-Rottluff (1884–1976), 1 painting : Artic
- Julian Schnabel (born 1951), 1 painting : Artic
- Walter Elmer Schofield (1866–1944), 2 paintings : Artic
- Adolf Schreyer (1828–1899), 2 paintings : Artic
- William Samuel Schwartz (1896–1977), 1 painting : Artic
- Jan van Scorel (1495–1562), 2 paintings : Artic
- Sean Scully (born 1945), 2 paintings : Artic
- Kurt Seligmann, 9 paintings : Artic
- Paul Sérusier (1864–1927), 1 painting : Artic
- Sesson Shukei (1504 – c. 1589), 1 painting : Artic
- Georges Seurat (1859–1891), 3 paintings (A Sunday Afternoon on the Island of La Grande Jatte): Artic
- Gino Severini (1883–1966), 3 paintings : Artic
- Leopold Gould Seyffert (1887–1956), 1 painting : Artic
- Ben Shahn (1898–1969), 1 painting : Artic
- Shao Yixuan (1886–1954), 1 painting : Artic
- Charles Green Shaw (1892–1974), 2 paintings : Artic
- Joshua Shaw (1776–1861), 1 painting : Artic
- Charles Sheeler (1883–1965), 2 paintings : Artic
- Shen Kai (active 18th Century), 1 painting : Artic
- Shen Yongling (1614–1698), 1 painting : Artic
- Shen Zhou (1427–1509), 1 painting : Artic
- Shibata Zeshin (1807–1891), 1 painting : Artic
- Mandara Shika (15th Century), 1 painting : Artic
- Everett Shinn (1876–1953), 1 painting : Artic
- Kazuo Shiraga (1924–2008), 1 painting : Artic
- Walter Shirlaw (1838–1909), 1 painting : Artic
- Morita Shiryū (1912–1998), 1 painting : Artic
- Paul Signac (1863–1935), 1 painting : Artic
- Amy Sillman (born 1954), 1 painting : Artic
- Lucien Simon (born 1961), 1 painting : Artic
- John Philip Simpson (1782–1847), 1 painting (The Captive Slave): Artic
- David Alfaro Siqueiros (1896–1974), 1 painting : Artic
- Mario Sironi (1885–1961), 1 painting : Artic
- Alfred Sisley (1839–1899), 6 paintings : Artic
- Hannah Brown Skeele (1829–1901), 1 painting : Artic
- John French Sloan (1871–1951), 1 painting : Artic
- John Smybert (1688–1751), 2 paintings : Artic
- Kimber Smith (1922–1981), 1 painting : Artic
- Frans Snyders (1579–1657), 1 painting : Artic
- Gerard Soest (1600–1681), 1 painting : Artic
- Harald Sohlberg (1877–1935), 1 painting : Artic
- Francesco Solimena (1657–1743), 3 paintings : Artic
- Alan Sonfist (born 1946), 5 paintings : Artic
- Martín de Soria (fl. (1449–1487), 2 paintings : Artic
- Joaquín Sorolla (1863–1923), 3 paintings : Artic
- Oguri Sôtan (1413–1481), 1 painting : Artic
- Pierre Soulages (1919–2022), 2 paintings : Artic
- Chaïm Soutine (1893–1943), 2 paintings : Artic
- Amadeo de Souza Cardoso (1887–1918), 3 paintings : Artic
- Hasegawa Soya (1590–1667), 1 painting : Artic
- Lo Spagna (died 1529), 1 painting : Artic
- Elizabeth Sparhawk-Jones (1885–1968), 2 paintings : Artic
- Eugene Speicher (1883–1962), 1 painting : Artic
- Adriaen van der Spelt (1632–1673), 1 painting : Artic
- Frederick Randolph Spencer (1806–1875), 1 painting : Artic
- Robert Spencer (1879–1931), 1 painting : Artic
- Spinello Aretino (1330–1410), 1 painting : Artic
- Theodore Stamos (1922–1997), 1 painting : Artic
- Gherardo Starnina (1354–1409), 1 painting : Artic
- Evelyn Statsinger (1927–2016), 1 painting : Artic
- Nicolas de Staël (1914–1955), 1 painting : Artic
- Jan Steen (1626–1679), 1 painting : Artic
- Hendrik van Steenwijk II (1580–1649), 1 painting : Artic
- Frank Stella (born 1936), 3 paintings : Artic
- Joseph Stella (1877–1946), 3 paintings : Artic
- Veronica Stern (1717–1801), 2 paintings : Artic
- Hedda Sterne (1910–2011), 1 painting : Artic
- Florine Stettheimer (1871–1944), 1 painting : Artic
- Alfred Stevens (sculptor) (1817–1875), 1 painting : Artic
- Nelson Stevens (born 1938), 1 painting : Artic
- Clyfford Still (1904–1980), 2 paintings : Artic
- Rudolf Stingel (born 1956), 1 painting : Artic
- Mathias Stoltenberg (1799–1871), 1 painting : Artic
- Bernardo Strozzi (1581–1644), 1 painting : Artic
- Gilbert Stuart (1755–1828), 1 painting : Artic
- Su Liupeng (1701–1862), 1 painting : Artic
- Robert Matthew Sully (1803–1855), 1 painting : Artic
- Thomas Sully (1783–1872), 3 paintings : Artic
- Léopold Survage (1879–1968), 5 paintings : Artic
- Suzuki Kiitsu (1796–1858), 1 painting : Artic
- George Gardner Symons (1861–1930), 1 painting : Artic

== T ==
- Tawaraya Sōtatsu (c. 1570 – c. 1640), 1 painting : Artic
- T'ang Haywen (1927–1991), 2 paintings : Artic
- Taddeo di Bartolo (1362–1422), 1 painting : Artic
- Rufino Tamayo (1899–1991), 3 paintings : Artic
- Reizei Tamechika (1823–1864), 1 painting : Artic
- Tang Haiwen (1929–1991), 1 painting : Artic
- Tang Yin (1470–1524), 1 painting : Artic
- Yves Tanguy (1900–1955), 3 paintings : Artic
- Henry Ossawa Tanner (1859–1937), 1 painting : Artic
- Tony Tasset (born 1960), 1 painting : Artic
- Pavel Tchelitchew (1898–1957), 1 painting : Artic
- Pieter Mulier II (1637–1701), 1 painting : Artic
- David Teniers the Younger (1610–1690), 4 paintings : Artic
- Gerard ter Borch (1617–1681), 1 painting : Artic
- Hendrick ter Brugghen (1588–1629), 1 painting (The Denial of Saint Peter): Artic
- Abbott Handerson Thayer (1849–1921), 1 painting : Artic
- Wayne Thiebaud (1920–2021), 1 painting : Artic
- Hans Thoma (1839–1924), 1 painting : Artic
- Alma Thomas (1891–1978), 1 painting : Artic
- Bob Thompson (1937–1966), 4 paintings : Artic
- Harry Thompson (?–1901), 1 painting : Artic
- William John Thomson (1771–1845), 1 painting : Artic
- Giovanni Battista Tiepolo (1696–1770), 5 paintings : Artic
- Giovanni Domenico Tiepolo (1727–1804), 1 painting : Artic
- Tintoretto (1518–1594), 2 paintings : Artic
- Domenico Tintoretto (1560–1635), 1 painting : Artic
- Titian (1485–1576), 1 painting : Artic
- Mark Tobey (1890–1976), 2 paintings : Artic
- Fred Tomaselli (born 1956), 1 painting : Artic
- Torii Kiyonobu I (c. 1664 – 1729), 1 painting : Artic
- Toriyama Sekien (1712–1788), 1 painting : Artic
- Helen Torr (1886–1967), 1 painting : Artic
- Tosa Mitsuoki (1617–1691), 2 paintings : Artic
- Henri de Toulouse-Lautrec (1864–1901), 6 paintings (At the Moulin Rouge): Artic
- Paul Trebilcock (1902–1981), 1 painting : Artic
- Pierre-Charles Trémolières (1703–1739), 1 painting : Artic
- Francesco Trevisani (1656–1746), 1 painting : Artic
- Benjamin Trott (ca. 1770–1843), 1 painting : Artic
- Constant Troyon (1810–1865), 4 paintings : Artic
- John Trumbull (1756–1843), 1 painting : Artic
- Cosimo Tura (c. 1430 – 1495), 1 painting : Artic
- Alessandro Turchi (1578–1649), 1 painting : Artic
- J. M. W. Turner (1775–1851), 2 paintings : Artic
- Richard Tuttle (born 1941), 1 painting : Artic
- Luc Tuymans (born 1958), 3 paintings : Artic
- John Henry Twachtman (1853–1902), 2 paintings : Artic
- Cy Twombly (1928–2011), 2 paintings : Artic
- Jack Tworkov (1900–1982), 1 painting : Artic
- Tôsendô Rifû (active c. 1730), 1 painting : Artic

== U ==
- Günther Uecker (born 1930), 1 painting : Artic
- Walter Ufer (1876–1936), 2 paintings : Artic
- Ugolino di Nerio (1295–1347), 1 painting : Artic
- Utagawa Hiroshige (1797–1858), 1 painting : Artic
- Utagawa Toyohiro (1773–1828), 1 painting : Artic
- Maurice Utrillo (1883–1955), 2 paintings : Artic

== V ==
- Pierre-Henri de Valenciennes (1750–1819), 2 paintings : Artic
- DeWain Valentine (1936–2022), 1 painting : Artic
- Félix Vallotton (1865–1925), 2 paintings : Artic
- Georges Vantongerloo (1886–1965), 1 painting : Artic
- Victor Vasarely (1908–1997), 1 painting : Artic
- Giorgio Vasari (1511–1574), 1 painting : Artic
- Pietro della Vecchia (1603–1678), 1 painting : Artic
- Elihu Vedder (1836–1923), 3 paintings : Artic
- Otto van Veen (1556–1629), 1 painting : Artic
- Adriaen van de Velde (1636–1672), 1 painting : Artic
- Diego Velázquez (1599–1660), 1 painting (The Kitchen Maid): Artic
- Claude Venard (1913–1999), 2 paintings : Artic
- Raphael Vergos (fl.1492–1501), 2 paintings : Artic
- Claude Joseph Vernet (1714–1789), 1 painting : Artic
- Paolo Veronese (1528–1588), 1 painting : Artic
- Maria Elena Vieira da Silva (1908–1992), 2 paintings : Artic
- Jacques Villon (1875–1963), 3 paintings : Artic
- Antonio Vivarini (1415–1476), 1 painting : Artic
- Maurice de Vlaminck (1876–1958), 3 paintings : Artic
- Pierre-Jacques Volaire (1729–1792?), 1 painting : Artic
- Robert Vonnoh (1858–1933), 1 painting : Artic
- Édouard Vuillard (1868–1940), 10 paintings : Artic

== W ==
- Ferdinand Georg Waldmüller (1793–1865), 1 painting : Artic
- Samuel Lovett Waldo (1783–1861), 3 paintings : Artic
- Wang Ning (fl.19th Century), 1 painting : Artic
- Andy Warhol (1928–1987), 2 paintings : Artic
- Jean-Antoine Watteau (1684–1721), 2 paintings : Artic
- George Frederic Watts (1817–1904), 2 paintings : Artic
- Frederick Judd Waugh (1861–1940), 1 painting : Artic
- Max Weber (1881–1961), 1 painting : Artic
- Jan Baptist Weenix (1621–1661), 1 painting : Artic
- Lawrence Weiner (1942–2021), 1 painting : Artic
- J. Alden Weir (1852–1919), 1 painting : Artic
- Neil Welliver (1929–2005), 1 painting : Artic
- Wen Zhengming (1470–1559), 1 painting : Artic
- William Wendt (1865–1946), 1 painting : Artic
- Tom Wesselmann (1931–2004), 1 painting : Wesselmann Artic
- Benjamin West (1738–1820), 4 paintings : Artic
- Rogier van der Weyden (1400–1464), 2 paintings : Artic
- Rogier van der Weyden (1400–1464), 1 painting : Artic
- Margaret Wharton (1943–2014), 2 paintings : Artic
- James Abbott McNeill Whistler (1834–1903), 10 paintings : Artic
- Thomas Whitcombe (c. 1752 – 1824), 1 painting : Artic
- Charles Wilbert White (1918–1979), 1 painting : Artic
- Jack Whitten (1939–2018), 1 painting : Artic
- Jean-Baptiste Wicar (1762–1834), 1 painting : Artic
- Antoine Wiertz (1806–1865), 1 painting : Artic
- Guy Carleton Wiggins (1883–1962), 1 painting : Artic
- William T. Wiley (1937–2021), 1 painting : Artic
- John Willenbecher (born 1936), 1 painting : Artic
- Sue Williams (born 1954), 2 paintings : Artic
- Karl Wirsum (1939–2021), 5 paintings : Artic
- Emanuel de Witte (1617–1692), 1 painting : Artic
- David Wojnarowicz (1954–1992), 2 paintings : Artic
- John Wollaston (painter) (1672–1749), 3 paintings : Artic
- Martin Wong (1946–1999), 1 painting : Artic
- Wucius Wong (born 1936), 10 paintings : Artic
- Grant Wood (1891–1942), 2 paintings (American Gothic): Artic
- Hale Aspacio Woodruff (1900–1980), 1 painting : Artic
- Christopher Wool (born 1955), 2 paintings : Artic
- Joseph Wright of Derby (1734–1797), 1 painting : Artic
- Joachim Wtewael (1566–1638), 1 painting : Artic
- Andrew Wyeth (1917–2009), 1 painting : Artic

== X ==
- Xia Chang (1388–1470), 1 painting : Artic
- Xiang Shengmo (1597–1658), 1 painting : Artic
- Xie Zhiliu (1910–1997), 1 painting : Artic
- Xu Chongsi (fl.18th Century), 1 painting : Artic
- Xugu (1227–1307), 8 paintings : Artic

== Y ==
- Yamaguchi Sekkei (1644–1732), 1 painting : Artic
- Yamakawa Shūhō (1898–1944), 1 painting : Artic
- Yang Jin (1644–1728), 1 painting : Artic
- Jack Butler Yeats (1871–1957), 1 painting : Artic
- Yongrong (1744–1790), 1 painting : Artic
- Ray Yoshida (1930–2009), 10 paintings : Artic
- Jack Youngerman (1926–2020), 2 paintings : Artic
- Yuan Jiang (c. 1671 – c. 1746), 1 painting : Artic

== Z ==
- Eugène Zak (1884–1926), 1 painting : Artic
- Zao Wou-Ki (1920–2013), 2 paintings : Artic
- Kestutis Edward Zapkus (born 1938), 3 paintings : Artic
- Zeng Mi (born 1935), 1 painting : Artic
- Arnold Chang (Zhang Hong) (born 1954), 1 painting : Artic
- Zhao Chunxiang (1913–1991), 1 painting : Artic
- Zhu Daoping (born 1929), 1 painting : Artic
- Félix Ziem (1821–1911), 1 painting : Artic
- Marguerite Zorach (1887–1968), 1 painting : Artic
- William Zorach (1887–1966), 1 painting : Artic
- Anders Zorn (1860–1920), 4 paintings : Artic
- Joe Zucker (born 1941), 5 paintings : Artic
- Ignacio Zuloaga (1870–1945), 1 painting : Artic
- Francisco de Zurbarán (1598–1664), 2 paintings : Artic
- Juan de Zurbarán (1620–1649), 1 painting : Artic
