= Julia Fish =

American artist (born 1950)

- Born: 1950 (age 75–76); Toledo, Oregon
- Spouse(s): Richard Rezac, American sculptor
- Website: Julia Fish

Julia Fish (born 1950) is an American artist whose paintings have a deceptive simplicity. She paints in oil on stretched rectangular canvases of varying size. By means of close observation of everyday subjects—leaves of a tree seen through a window, a section of floor tiles, an old fashioned light fixture— she makes, as one critic says, "quiet, abstract manifestations of observed realities." She is a studio artist who paints not what she sees in an instant but rather what she observes continuously, day after day. The result, she says, is not so much temporal as durational. Her paintings compress many instances of observation so as to become, as she sees it, "a parallel system to a lived experience." The paintings lack spatial orientation and, as a critic says, can "be described as both highly realistic and abstract without compromising either term." In 2008, Alan G. Artner, writing in the Chicago Tribune, said "This is work of small refinements and adjustments. The world of everyday things generates it, but Fish's qualities of seeing and touch elevate the things to a plane on which they leave behind their humble character."

== Early life and training ==
In 1950, Fish was born on the Oregon coast in the small community of Toledo . She has said that her parents, who refused to have a television in their house, guided her to develop an early interest in reading, drawing, and music. She attended the Museum Art School of the Pacific Northwest College of Art in Portland, Oregon, and there obtained a Bachelor of Fine Arts degree in 1976. She later praised the high quality of that school's teachers, the intensity of its classes, and a prevailing atmosphere which encouraged close interaction among its students. (Note: In a 2010 interview, Fish named Robert Hanson, Anne Johnson, Harry Widman, George Johanson, Eunice Parsons, Lenny Pitkin as great teachers whose classes she took.) After graduating from PNCA she crossed the continent to attend the Mount Royal School of Art within the Maryland Institute College of Art, Baltimore, Maryland, obtaining a Master of Fine Arts degree in 1982.

== Career ==
=== Iowa, 1982-1985 ===
Between 1982 and 1985, Fish was a visiting artist and assistant professor of painting and drawing at the University of Iowa, Iowa City, Iowa. During her student years she had made large, abstract paintings. After the move to Iowa, her work became smaller and less abstract. She has said that, in part, she felt an emotional connection with to the landscape paintings of John Frederick Kensett, Martin Johnson Heade, and Albert Pinkham Ryder.

In 1984, Fish was given a solo exhibition called "Drawings 1976 -1984" at Lane Community College in Eugene, Oregon. That year she also participated in a faculty exhibition at the University of Iowa Museum of Art and in the late 1970s and early 1980s her work appeared in group shows at Mount Hood Community College (in 1978 with Esther Podemski); the Hallie Ford Museum of Art; Willamette University ("Oregon Women Artists" 1979); Linfield College, McMinnville, Oregon ("Current Concerns" 1983); and the Meyerhoff Gallery in the Maryland Institute College of Art ("Ten Years, Mount Royal School of Painting" 1985).

=== 1980s ===
In 1985, Fish moved to Chicago. At that time or sometime during the previous few years she married the sculptor, Richard Rezac. Like her, he was a graduate of PNCA (B.F.A. 1974) and MICA (M.F.A. 1982).

That year she showed in commercial galleries for the first time: an invitational show at a gallery called Feature, Inc. concurrent with a group exhibition at the Rhona Hoffman Gallery, both in Chicago. (Note: Both galleries specialized in contemporary art. The Feature, Inc. was set up in 1984 by an artist who used only his surname, Hudson. He moved the gallery to New York in 1988 where he became known for introducing new artists who would later develop successful careers. The Rhona Hoffman gallery opened in 1976 by Rhona Hoffman and her husband Donald Young. Since 1983, Hoffman has run it independently and is now considered to be one of the most influential proponents of contemporary art in Chicago.) In 1986, she participated in a dual exhibition at Feature, Inc. along with her husband and in two other group shows, one at the Hyde Park Art Center and the other at the Robbin Lockett Gallery. The name of the last of these shows, "Abstracted Landscapes," indicates the nature of her paintings at this time. A critic called them "reticent pieces," free of bombast, that were "romantic, hazy, and soft-edged in form" and said they were not so much landscapes as the memoir of landscapes. Fish's work appeared again at the Robbin Lockett Gallery in one solo (1987) and two group shows (1988 and 1991). (Note: In 1986 Fish had appeared with twelve other young artists in the Robbin Lockett Gallery's very first exhibition. Lockett, who was herself only 27 years old at the time, closed the gallery eight years later saying that Chicago did not provide enough support for cutting-edge contemporary art. Alan G. Artner of the Chicago Tribune said at this time, "Fish does not paint from nature but creates mirrors of herself that embody a good deal of rural or bucolic experience.") At the time of her 1988 appearance at this gallery, a critic said Fish was one of the fortunate few among Chicago artists who was able to sell all that she exhibited and had a waiting list of collectors willing to buy. The wait might be a long one since Fish worked slowly. (Note: Fish said at the time that she did not want demand for her work to affect her. The intrinsic value of each painting is what is important, she said, not the reputation of the artist. She said "what's really remarkable is when someone I don't even know tells me they respond to my work, which is happening more and more. That's something I cherish, and it's more valuable to me than anything else. Four years ago, if you'd told me I'd be in this position, I wouldn't have believed it.") In 1987, Fish participated in the inaugural exhibition of José Freire's Fiction/Nonfiction Gallery in Manhattan's East Village, her first appearance in a New York gallery. (Note: Fiction/Nonfiction was a small gallery located at 10th Street and Avenue B. It was created by José Freire who, having lost his job in a local gallery, decided to open one of his own. He moved it first to SoHo in 1989 and later to Chelsea. He closed it before partnering with Lisa Ruyter in 1996 to found the Team Gallery in SoHo which, like Fiction/Nonfiction, specializes in young contemporary artists.) Since that early appearance Fish has frequently exhibited in Manhattan galleries including the Loughelton Gallery (solo, 1988 and 1989), the Amy Lipton Gallery (solo 1992), the Lipton-Owens Company (solo, 1995), Feigen Contemporary (group 1998, solo 1999), the Hollis Taggart Galleries (group 2015), and the David Nolan Gallery (solo 2015, group 2016).

In 1988, Fish described the slow process by which most of her work evolved. She said, "It's very unusual that I'll see something, go to the studio, draw it and paint it. That rarely happens. I'll see it and it will stay in my head for a while, and maybe later I'll try to figure out through drawing what I saw. But sometimes it's a delay of two months, or four or six. That's part of the distilling, getting a sense of what's literal there, what's tangible and intangible, what's abstract and some other kind of order."

In 1989, Fish contributed a painting called "Rock" in her first museum exhibition in Chicago. Held by the Renaissance Society, the show paired one piece from each of twenty-three artists with one of the Date paintings by the Japanese artist On Kawara. (Note: On Kawara began making Date paintings on January 4, 1966. Each consists of a date, recorded in the language and grammatical conventions of the country in which he was resident at the time. Most are done in acrylic paint, white on black, on canvases of eight inches by ten inches or larger.) She participated in other Renaissance Society group shows in 1994 and 1996, and was given a solo exhibition in 2015 (discussed below).

=== 1990s ===
Julia Fish, Entry (Fragment One) Negative, 1998, Oil on linen, 11½ x 20½ inches

In the early 1990s Fish began making small paintings of objects in her immediate environment generally showing a section rather than the entire unit. These subjects included part of a brick wall, the winter sky seen through a window, hexagonal tiles on a bathroom floor, and tar paper siding on a neighboring building. A reviewer said, "There is something comforting, and charismatically fascinating in staring at these familiar patterns." Of this new work she said, "I encounter the subjects continually so they become extremely familiar, though I don't work from observation. I don't place the canvas next to the window and paint what's outside. I don't look at the subject and paint at the same time. So there's memory and recollection in the work, but time is telescoped."

The floor tile paintings appeared on canvas in the exact dimensions of the original. To make them she would first trace a section of tile for use as template for a painting that would follow. Quoting Walter Benjamin's comment that "to dwell means to leave traces," she said she wished such traces of personal presence to manifest themselves in her paintings . (Note: Fish referred to Benjamin's statement as rendered by Beatriz Colomina in Privacy and Publicity: Modern Architecture As Mass Media (Cambridge, Mass: MIT Press, 1994). The original is found in Walter Benjamin and Rolf Tiedemann The arcades project (Cambridge, Mass: Belknap Press, 1999). In this translation, the statement is given as "to dwell means to leave traces. " The original is "habiter signifie laisser des traces" in Walter Benjamin, Œuvres II: Poésie et révolution (Les Lettres Nouvelle, Denoël, 1971, p. 139.) By 1999, she thought the floor tile project, which she called Entry, was completed. On a trip to Vienna, however, she gave close examination to the exterior of the Portois-Fix Palace designed by the architect, Max Fabiani and discovered in its facade a constantly shifting visual experience. Drawing on this discovery she made a series she called Entry (borders and corners) in 2000.

Julia Fish, Entry (Fragment Two), 1998, oil on canvas, 17½ x 16½ inches

In 1996 the Renaissance Society mounted a solo retrospective of her work in the decade from 1985 to 1995. The exhibition's thirty-five paintings and drawings documented her transition from atmospheric subjects—such as rain or sky—and natural objects—such as leaves or rocks—to closely observed elements within and near to the prosaic urban building where she lived. She usually retained the color of the subject, rendering it in subdued hues and subtly enhancing it in multiple thin layers of paint. In both the earlier choice of subjects and the newer one Fish used "abstraction," as she said, "to purify or distill an image." Her paintings usually have recognizable subjects but give no illusion of depth. They are abstract in the sense that the viewer tends to concentrate on the surface of the canvas, its weave and the pigment upon it. She achieved an elusive balance between the exact transcription of the objects she so closely observed and the abstraction of those objects on the painting's surface. She said she aimed to recast her subjects so that they retained all their properties but also incorporated her understanding of abstraction.

In addition to the Renaissance Society retrospective Fish contributed works to group and solo exhibitions at a large number museums and private galleries during the 1990s. These included the Miller Gallery at Carnegie Mellon University (group, 1990), the Museum of Contemporary Art, Chicago (groups, 1990, 1991, 1996, 1998), the Christopher Grimes Gallery, Santa Monica (group, 1992, and solo, 1993, 1995, 1998), three German galleries (group, Berlinische Galerie 1994; group, Galerie Klaus Fischer 1997; group, KunstMitte Berlin/Galerie Klaus Fischer, Berlin 1998), as well as commercial galleries in Chicago and New York.

=== 2000s ===
While continuing to choose her subjects from her immediate urban environment, Fish changed her approach roughly at the turn of the century. Closely observed objects such as sections of floor tile and asphalt siding gave way to abstractly rendered thresholds, stairs and stair landings, a light fixture, and floor plans of rooms in her home. Like her earlier work, these paintings, she said, were impressed on the surface of the canvas in a way that approximated the experience of seeing the same things over and over, day after day. She came to see transitions as the subject of her work, the sense of walking across a threshold, moving from room to room; or the sense of light moving through a room during the day and into it from a wall fixture at night. She understood such transitions to be both actual and metaphorical. The visual elements she put on her canvases were meant to convey physical objects but also her own motion through the spaces they represented and the light that came from fixtures in the rooms and through the windows. The result could be seen, as one reviewer said, "as a thoughtful meditation on the nature of occupancy within a domestic environment, exactingly rendered in multiple paint layers."

Detail (bottom right) from: Julia Fish, Threshold, NorthWest—One (spectrum: violet with grey), 2010-2011, 2014, oil on canvas, 23 x 38 inches

She said her Living Rooms project evolved from her examination of Fabiani's architecture both in Vienna and other cities. When she and her husband took possession of the building in Chicago that was their home they were given a set of floor plans for the structure. The plans and inspiration from Fabiani led to a series of drawings and paintings she created during the decade from 2001 to 2011. She made all the paintings at the same time, keeping them in view on the walls of her studio as her ideas evolved during the period of their creation. Each is one seventh the size of the room it represents and all are abstracted dramatically by elimination of elements in the plans from which she worked and by inclusion of shapes that denote motion and light. Her intention was to use these marks to convey life as she experienced it in the rooms. Describing them as "acrobatic," she aimed to activate the marks in the eye of the observer.

While working on the Living Rooms series, she also made a series called Stairs and Landings (2006-2007, 2009) and Thresholds (2009-2015) as well as a set of drawings and paintings of a light fixture (2014-2015). Of the two latter sets one reviewer said, "Only by prolonged looking do you become aware of how masterful Fish is in coaxing paint to evoke something as ephemeral as a light fixture seen in the dark or the striations of light seen on a floor connecting one part of the house to another."

Fish has participated in many group and solo shows from 2000 onward including eight appearances in group shows at the Museum of Contemporary Art in Chicago and four at the Art Institute of Chicago. Her work appeared in three group and two solo exhibitions at the Rhona Hoffman Gallery, Chicago, and one group and one solo at the David Nolan Gallery in New York. In 2010 the Illinois State University College of Fine Arts gave Fish a retrospective exhibition of studies and drawings from 1996 onward. She also showed three Threshold paintings in the 2010 Whitney Biennial.

=== 2010s ===
In 2015, a reviewer said of her recent work, "It is this quality of scrutiny — of looking with such focused intensity that the commonplace things in the world become mysterious — that I find compelling. Fish is able to revisit the familiar in paint so that it moves closer to its original state of incomprehensibility."

== Exhibitions ==
Solo exhibitions

- Julia Fish: bound by spectrum, DePaul Art Museum, Chicago, IL, 2019

== Books, monographs and catalogs ==
- Julia Fish: bound by spectrum, (exhibition catalog), contributions from Julie Rodrigues Widholm, Kate Nesin, Dan Wheeler and Colm Tóibín, 2019 ISBN 9780996235037
