= Matthias Gerung =

16th century German painter

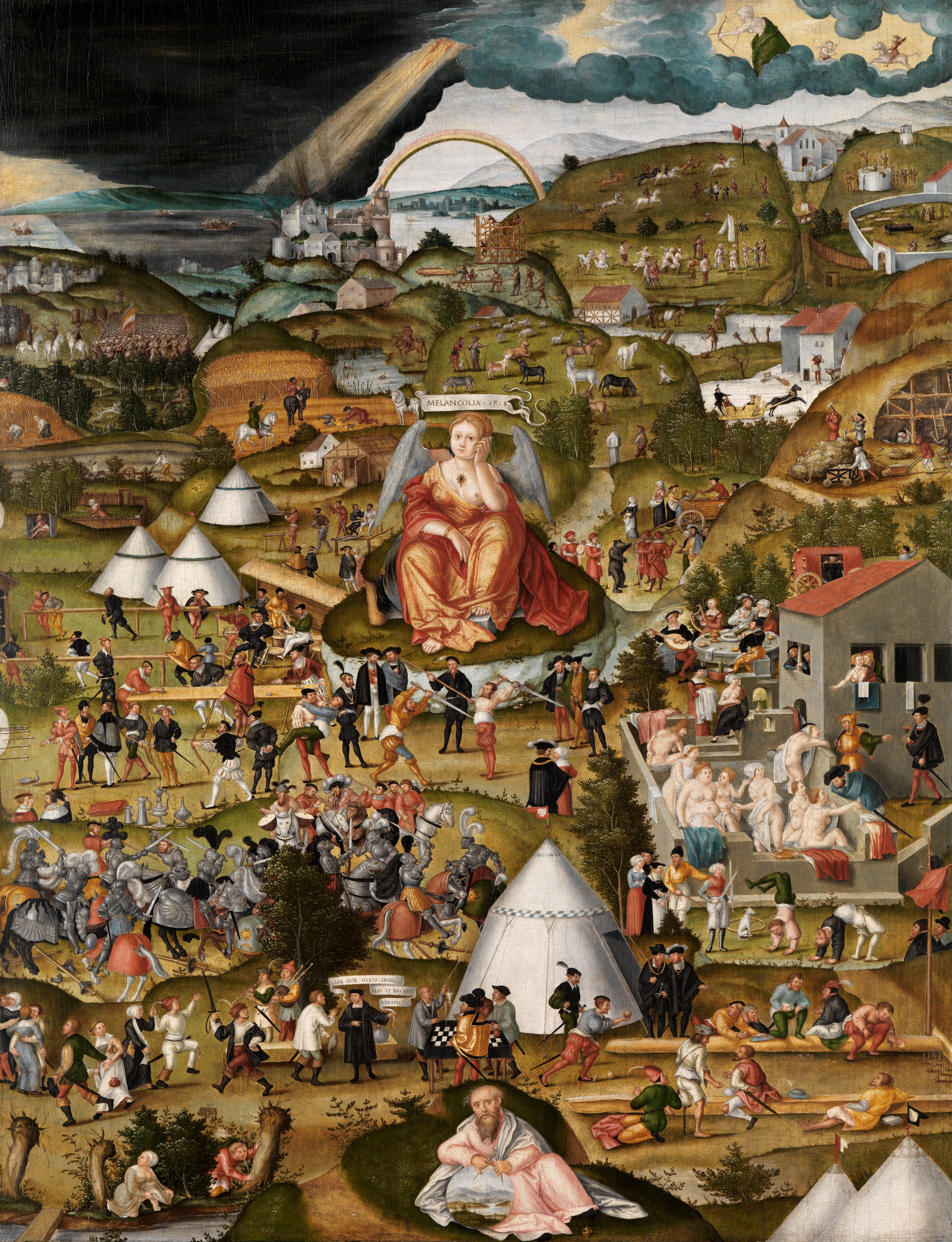
Melancholy in the Garden of Life (1558), Staatliche Kunsthalle Karlsruhe

Matthias Gerung or, in older literature, Mathias Geron (c. 1500, Nördlingen – 1570, Lauingen), was a German painter and woodcut artist.

== Biography ==
He was probably the son of a violinist known as "Shoemaker" Matthias (?–1521) and may have studied painting with Hans Leonhard Schäufelin. Earlier sources indicate that he also studied with Hans Burgkmair. In 1525, he moved to Lauingen in the Duchy of Pfalz-Neuburg. He then married Anna Reiser, who was likely the daughter of Matthes Reiser (?–c.1519); also a painter. Gerung may have moved there to take over his workshop. He and Anna had two sons, Ambrosius and Hans, who became a goldsmith.

In 1530–31, he carried out several commissions for Otto Henry, Elector Palatine, including wallpaper design at Schloss Neuburg, the production of genealogical tapestries and the creation of illustrations for what has come to be known as the Ottheinrich Bible, one of the most valuable medieval manuscripts in existence. The Bible had been started almost 100 years earlier and he added 117 illustrations.

He appears once again in the tax lists for 1568, where he is also described as a constable and siegler (a type of notary).

His detailed panel paintings provide a wealth of information about life in 16th century Germany. In addition to his clearly attributable works, he is also believed to have created several satirical pieces that criticized the Catholic Church and the Papacy.
