= C. P. Ream =

American painter

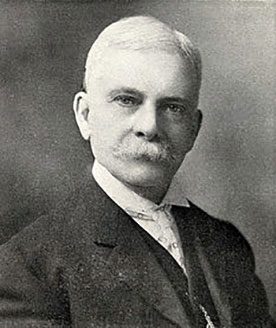
C. P. Ream (date unknown)

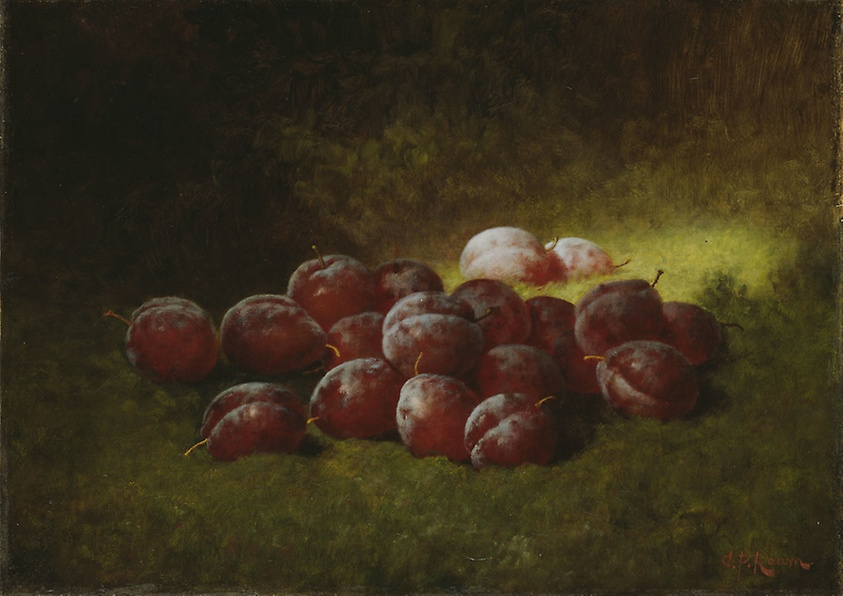
Purple Plums (or, Just Gathered)

Cadurcis Plantagenet Ream, also referred to as Carducius Plantagenet Ream (May 8, 1838, Sugar Grove, Ohio - 20 June 1917, Chicago), was an American still-life painter who specialized in fruit. The currently available art gallery and biographical sources are almost evenly divided as to what his actual first name was. Some give both.

== Biography ==
His father, Jonas Alexander Ream (1809-1882), a country lawyer, was originally from Pennsylvania. His younger brother, Morston Constantine Ream (1840-1898), also became a still-life painter. He first expressed an interest in art at the age of ten, and most sources indicate that he was self-taught. In the late 1850s, he displayed some of his first works at a photography shop owned by R. B. Douglas in Cleveland.

Around 1866, he moved to New York and sold some works at an auction in the Henry H. Leeds & Miner art gallery. In the 1870s he began a collaboration with the lithographer Louis Prang to create a series of works under the title "Desserts". Later, he opened a studio with his brother, Morston.

Seeking new markets, he moved to Chicago in 1878 and established a studio with (Judge Freer?). He soon began to exhibit regularly at the Art Institute of Chicago. This led to showings at the National Academy of Design, the Brooklyn Art Association and the Royal Academy of London. He was one of the first artists to hire professional "boosters" to advertise his works and he held his own auctions. In the 1880s, he often travelled to Europe, which included some time at the Academy of Fine Arts, Munich, spent with his fellow Ohioan, Frank Duveneck.

In 1882, he married Maria Gatzmeyer, a Franco-German from Hanover, who was twenty-six years his junior. She and their only son apparently remained in Germany, where he spent at least three months out of every year.

In 1899, his painting "Purple Plums" became the first work by a local artist to be included in the permanent collection at the Institute. By 1900, he was suffering from multiple health problems, including deafness. His last exhibit was at the Institute in 1909, when he became paralyzed in his right hand, probably from a stroke. By 1913, he was bedridden and remained so until his death.
