= Pierre-Charles Trémolières =

French painter (1703–1739)

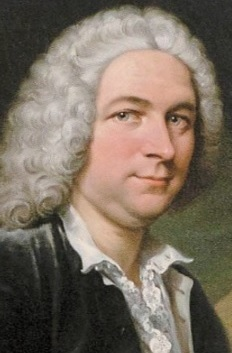
Detail of a painting (self-portrait) by Pierre-Charles Trémolières (c. 1737)

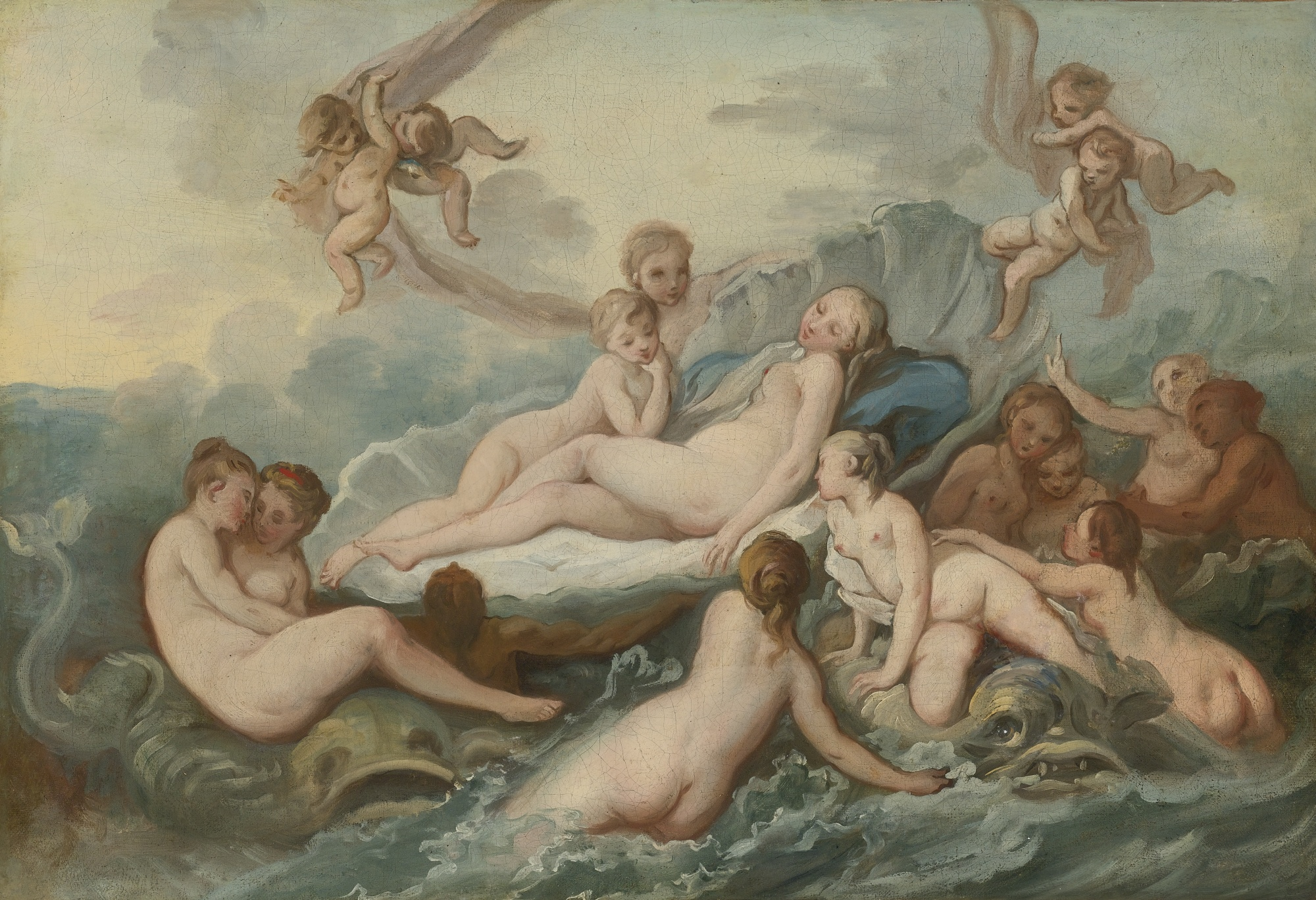
The Birth of Venus

Pierre-Charles Trémolières was born in Cholet, Province of Anjou and became an etcher and decorative painter of interiors. Today many of his works have been dismantled from their original installations and are remounted as moveable paintings on display in galleries.

He died in Paris.
