= Johann Koerbecke =

German painter

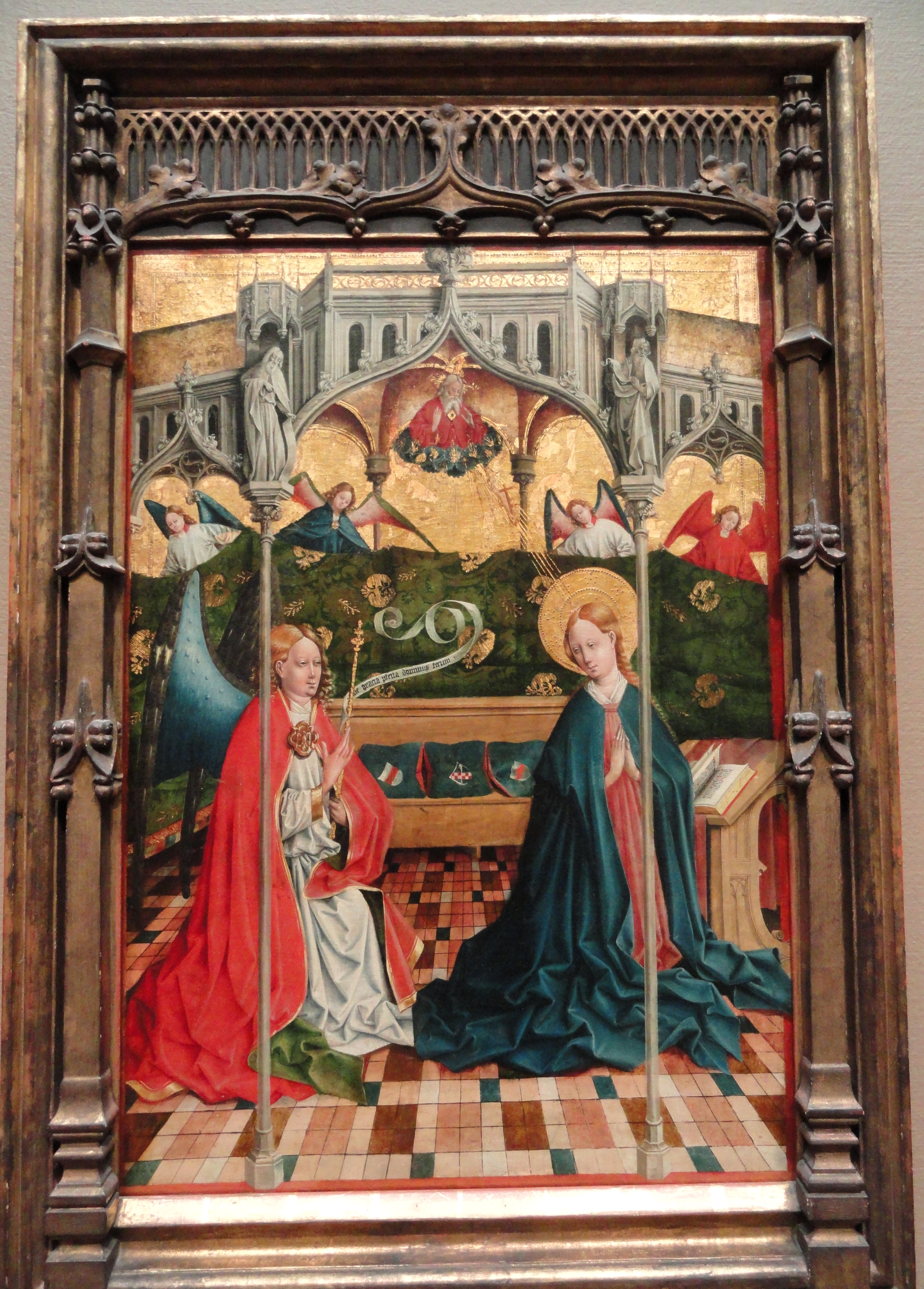
The Annunciation, by 1457, Johann Koerbecke - Art Institute of Chicago - DSC09627.JPG

Johann Koerbecke (c. 1415/20, Coesfeld or Münster - 13 June 1491, Münster) was a German Gothic painter of the Westphalian School. He is believed to have worked with the Master of the Schöppingen Altarpiece and the Master of 1473. He was the first painter from Westphalia who can be named.

== Life and work ==
His presence is attested to for the first time in 1443, when he and his wife, Elsa, took possession of his father's house in Münster. It is likely that he studied with his father, Heinrich, and another local artist, in the 1430s. Nothing is known of Heinrich's work, although his acquisition of the house and workshop is attested to in 1435.

Johann is mentioned several times, between 1453 and 1484, in documents from Münster, including invoices for altarpieces and as a witness to marriages and other legal contracts. In 1460, he appears on the list of members of the "Confrérie de Notre-Dame de l'église Saint-Gilles". Altogether, the documents establish that he was a well-situated member of the bourgeoisie. After his death in 1491, an obituary states that he was from Coesfeld, but this may refer to his family, rather than him specifically. Elsa retained possession of the house and workshop until 1495. He had two sons; Heinrich, who joined the clergy, and Hermann, who was also a painter.

He was the first painter in that area to use a style introduced in the Netherlands by Robert Campin; later brought to fruition by Jan van Eyck and Dirk Bouts. This style involves the use of bright colors, attention to detail, heads with individual characteristics and an intuitive approach to perspective.

His principal work involves sixteen panels on the flaps of the Marienfelder Altar, from 1457, originally in the church at Marienfeld Abbey in the town of Harsewinkel. The panels were scattered after the abbey and the monastery were dissolved in 1803. Six are on display at the Westphalian State Museum of Art and Cultural History. The others are in museums from Moscow to Chicago, including one at the National Gallery of Art in Washington, DC. Copies, arranged as they would have appeared originally, are in the current Abbey Church..

Few of his works created after 1470 can be attributed with any degree of certainty. An altarpiece panel at the Cleveland Museum of Art, originally thought to be his, has been tentatively reattributed to an unnamed Master.

== The Marienfeld Altar ==
Left exterior		Left interior		Right interior		Right exterior	
Christ's capture	Christ before Pilate	Mary at the Temple	The Annunciation	In the Temple	Appearance of the Risen Christ Before Mary	Bearing the Cross	Crucifixion
The Flagellation	Mockery	Christ is Born	lost probably : Adoration of the Magi	The Ascension of Christ	The Ascension of Mary	Burial	Resurrection

== Notes/Sources ==
- Paul Pieper (1980). "Koerbecke, Johann". Neue Deutsche Biographie (in German). Vol. 12. Berlin: Duncker & Humblot. p. 373. (full text online).
