= Bartolommeo Salvestrini =

Italian painter

Bartolommeo Salvestrini (died Florence 1630) was an Italian painter of the Baroque period, active mostly in Florence. He was a pupil of Matteo Rosselli and Giovanni Bilivert in Florence. He painted a Martyrdom of St Ursula for church of Santa Orsula in Florence, as well as paintings for the church of Santa Teresa. He died of the plague in 1630. A drawing at the Art Institute of Chicago is attributed to the painter

== Sources ==
- Boni, Filippo de' (1852). Biografia degli artisti ovvero dizionario della vita e delle opere dei pittori, degli scultori, degli intagliatori, dei tipografi e dei musici di ogni nazione che fiorirono da'tempi più remoti sino á nostri giorni. Seconda Edizione.. Venice; Googlebooks: Presso Andrea Santini e Figlio. pp. 640–641.
