= Master of the Worcester Panel =

German painter

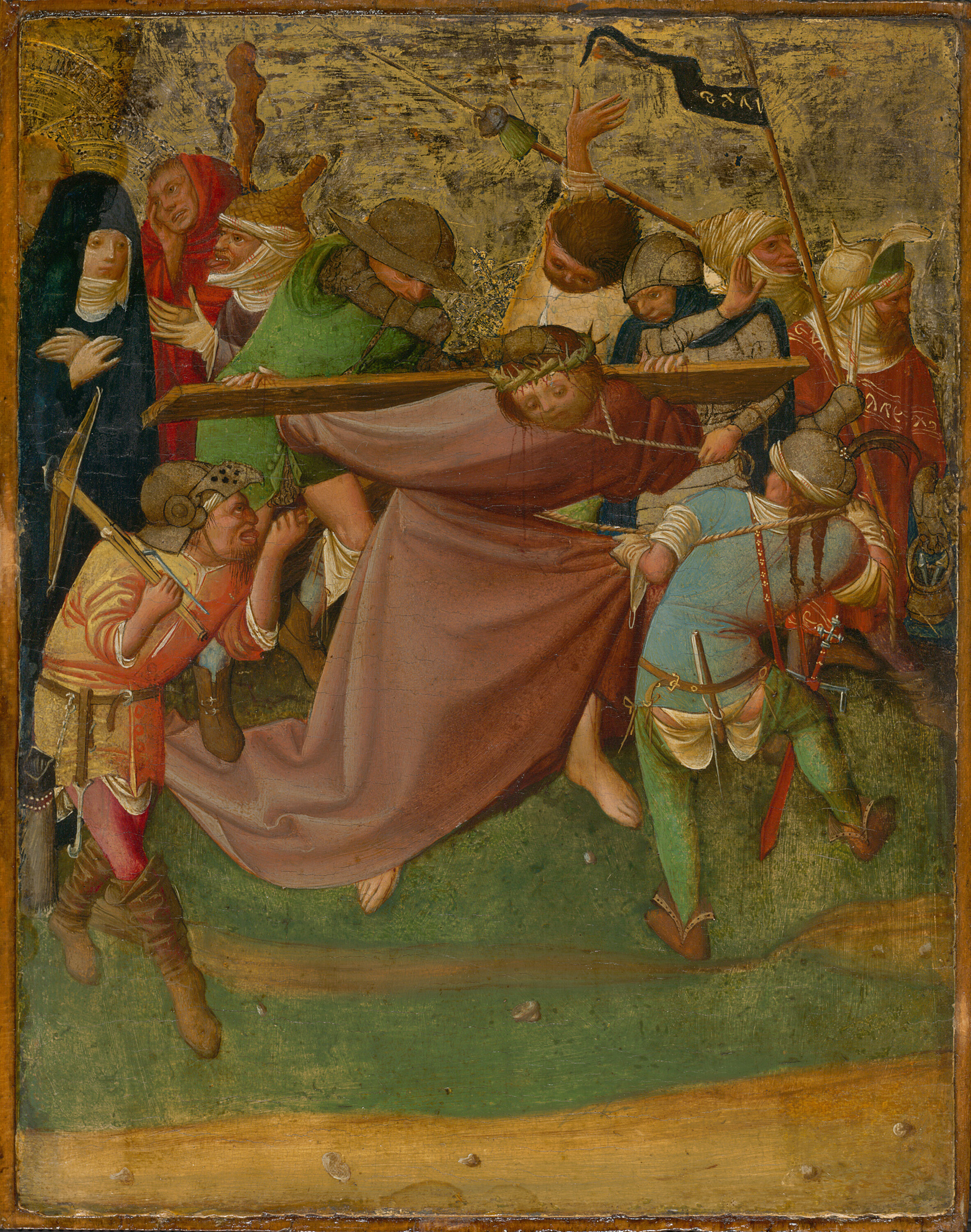
Christ Carrying the Cross

The Master of the Worcester Panel, or Master of the Worcester Carrying of the Cross was a Bavarian Gothic painter, active from c.1420-c.1430.

== Works ==
The artist's notname is in reference to a panel from an altarpiece that was in the collection of the painter, Charles Henry Worcester (1864-1956) and his wife Mary, which they donated to the Art Institute of Chicago. Another panel, "Mocking Christ", is in the British Museum. He may also be the creator of a "Calvary", in possession of the Städel Museum, Frankfurt.

He was a major figure in the artistic renaissance of Southern Germany and was well-known for over a century after his presumed time of death. Copies and imitations of his works may be found in Nuremberg, Nördlingen, Augsburg, Munich, Vienna, Salzburg, Wrocław and Kraków. At least three graduates of his workshop are known to have been active in Regensburg.

His own style was derived from illuminated manuscripts and he was influenced by the Master of the Saint Lambrecht Votive Altarpiece. Some influences from Northern Italy may also be detected.
