= Li Huayi =

Chinese painter

Li Huayi (Chinese: 李華弌; born 1948) is a contemporary ink artist whose admiration for the monumental landscapes of the Northern Song dynasty with his training in both traditional Chinese ink and Western art, inspired him to create his own style of ink painting.

Li has established a distinct connection between contemporary and traditional, and nature and humanity, by integrating his contemporary perspective with the eternal values of traditional literati painting.

Li Huayi's works are collected by museums worldwide including the British Museum, the Asian Art Museum of San Francisco, the Art Institute of Chicago, the Harvard Art Museums, the Brooklyn Museum, the Honolulu Museum of Art, the Suzhou Museum, M+ Hong Kong and the Hong Kong Museum of Art.

== Early life ==
Li Huayi was born in 1948 in Shanghai, China. At the age of six, he learned the art of traditional ink painting under the tutelage of Wang Jimei in private. When he was sixteen, Li began his studies of Western art with Zhang Chongren, who had studied at the Belgian Royal Academy and who was known for his realistic watercolors. During the Cultural Revolution (1966 - 1976), Li was exempt from being sent to the countryside and allowed to remain in Shanghai to paint Soviet-style propaganda murals as a result of his dexterity with brush and ink, and his training in Western art.

In the late 1970s, after the Cultural Revolution, Li Huayi traveled throughout China's significant scenic, historic and cultural sites including the monumental peaks of Huangshan in Anhui Province, which are often depicted in many of his paintings. In Gansu Province, Li studied the Buddhist cave temples at Dunhuang, teaching himself the early history of Chinese painting and gaining an understanding of religious painting. In 1978, Li traveled to Beijing where he saw his first Northern Song landscape painting and first major exhibition of modern Western art; both of which left him with deep and lasting impressions.

== Move to the United States ==
In 1982, Li Huayi and his wife immigrated to San Francisco. There, he enrolled at the Academy of Art, San Francisco, to study Western art and he completed his master's degree in 1984. In the same year, Li held his first one-man exhibition in America at the Pacific Asia Museum in Pasadena, featuring a combination of his Dunhuang-style paintings and his 'Abstract Expressionist' works. His abstract paintings received critical acclaim from the art historian and scholar of Chinese painting, Michael Sullivan.

== Artistic development ==
=== Inspiration and early works ===
In the 1980s, Li experimented with abstract forms of splash-ink, combining some elements of collage. During this period, he discovered his artistic calling to create something new in the most important traditional Chinese painting theme: landscape.

The Northern Song School tradition kept looming over Li Huayi. The first Northern Song painting he saw was Fan Kuan's Scene Under Snow, in 1978 at the Beijing Palace Museum. In 1989, Li visited the National Palace Museum in Taipei, where Guo Xi's Early Spring left lasting impressions.

=== Monumental landscape ===
Li's works of the 1990s evoke the landscape imagery of Li Cheng (919–967), Fan Kuan (active 990–1030), and Guo Xi (after 1000-ca. 1090). The faceted cliffs and gnarled pines in his compositions remind many of Huangshan's mountain peaks in Anhui Province. However, instead of the traditional mountain landscape paintings depicted at a distance, Li provides close-up details and places his viewers intimately within the landscape. By pulling the cliffs and pines in the center of the composition close to the viewer, he or she directly feels the monumentality of nature.

=== Multiple screens installation ===
Since ancient times, painting on screens has been common practice in the East, providing a bridge for the artistry of two-dimensional surfaces to three-dimensional works in physical space. Having considered the viewing experience of his audience, Li aimed to produce greater visual impact through the format of a screen. Since 2006, by placing a landscape hanging scroll in front of a backdrop of large, ink-and-brush filled panels, Li creates works of three-dimensional space in the form of installation art. This combination of traditional brush-and-ink painting with a contemporary presentation, suggests Li's innovative approach and opened up the potential of physical space in his art.

=== Ink on gilded screens ===
In the mid-2000s, Li Huayi has experimented with painting landscapes on gold leaf. He has accepted the challenge of applying ink and pigments to the smooth polished surface of gold leaf, which is vastly different from the surfaces of absorbent paper and silk on which he previously worked. Li has even purchased unpainted antique Japanese gilded screens in order to explore how earlier Japanese artists used their pigments and ink on such a surface. After experimenting for years, he created his first ink on gilded screen in 2008. Up to 2018, he has finished 4 works on golden paper and 26 works of ink on antique Japanese gilded screens.

=== Ink on gold or silver leaf ===
Since 2018, Li challenged himself in expanding the boundaries of his gilded series. Instead of applying ink to a gilded background, he first draws his composition on silk fabric and then lays gold leaf on top. Released from the limitations of a gilded background, the artist may alternate between solid and impressionistic ink strokes on silk as much as he wishes. The light of the painting no longer comes from its background, but rather it reflects the light shone upon it. At the same time, the artist begins to incorporate silver leaf, which produces a luminescence akin to moonshine in his paintings.

== Recent developments ==
Since the 1990s, Li Huayi has participated in solo and group exhibitions on an international scale at Stanford University, the Museum of Fine Arts, Boston, the National Art Museum of China, and was part of China 5000 Years Exhibition at the Guggenheim Museum in New York in 1999.

In September 2017, his 3-month solo exhibition Fantasies on Paper and Enchantment in Gold was exhibited at the Suzhou Museum in China. The exhibition presented 18 paintings from different periods of Li's artistic endeavor, covering representative works selected from the "Monumental Landscapes series", the "Water Scenes series", the "Multiple Screens Installation series" and the “Gilded Screen Series”, offering audiences a comprehensive understanding of Li's artistic developments over the prior 15 years.

In May 2018, international publisher Rizzoli and Kwai Fung Art Publishing in Hong Kong published a monograph on Li Huayi. The comprehensive publication includes more than 160 works representing each major period from 1993 to 2017, together with insightful art analysis, and provided bird's eye views as well as microscopic details of the artist's work.

In August 2019, the Honolulu Museum of Art in Hawaii hosted a 4-month retrospective exhibition Contemporary Landscapes: Li Huayi for Li Huayi. This exhibition traced the artist's career over three decades, including works never before seen by the public, as well as highlights from various stages of his artistic growth, in formats from hanging scrolls and gold screens to installations.

In November 2021, Kwai Fung Hin Art Gallery organised Infinities Between Ink and Gold - Recent Works of Li Huayi at F Hall, Tai Kwun, Hong Kong, presenting 12 pieces of Li's recent works from 2018 to 2021, showing his mastery in integrating gold foil with sophisticated ink and brushstrokes on silk.

== Solo exhibitions ==
- Infinities Between Ink and Gold - Recent Works of Li Huayi, Kwai Fung Hin Art Gallery, F Hall, Tai Kwun, Hong Kong, China, 2021
- Contemporary Landscapes: Li Huayi, Honolulu Museum of Art, Hawaii, the United States, 2019
- Law of Nature, Tao of Man, Kwai Fung Hin Art Gallery, Hong Kong, China, 2019
- Solo Exhibition of Li Huayi, Art021 Shanghai Contemporary Art Fair, Shanghai, China, 2018
- Fantasies on Paper and Enchantments in Gold, Suzhou Museum, Suzhou, China, 2017
- Solo Exhibition of Li Huayi, Kwai Fung Hin Art Gallery, Art Basel, Hong Kong, China, 2017
- Landscapes in New Dimensions, Kwai Fung Hin Art Gallery, Hong Kong, China, 2017
- Exotica, Recent Works of Li Huayi, Kwai Fung Hin Art Gallery, Hong Kong, China, 2016
- Waterfalls, Rocks and Bamboo by Li Huayi, Eskenazi Gallery, London, the United Kingdom, 2014
- Images of the Mind: The Ink Painting of Li Huayi, National Art Museum of China, Beijing, China, 2011
- Beyond Representation: Li Huayi's New Art, Beijing Center for the Arts, Beijing, China, 2011
- The Twelve Animals of the Zodiac by Li Huayi, Eskenazi Gallery, London, the United Kingdom, 2011
- Trees, Rocks, Mist and Mountains by Li Huayi, Eskenazi Gallery, New York Asia Week, New York, the United States, 2010
- Li Huayi at 60: Paintings in the Yiqingzhai Collection, The Ink Society, Hong Kong, China, 2008
- Mountain Landscapes by Li Huayi, Eskenazi Gallery, London, the United Kingdom, 2007
- The Monumental Landscapes of Li Huayi, Asian Art Museum of San Francisco, the United States, 2004
- The Landscapes of Li Huayi, Kaikodo, New York, the United States, 1997

== Group exhibitions ==
- Longing for Nature: Reading Landscapes in Chinese Art, Museum Rietberg, Zurich, Switzerland, 2020
- Ink Worlds: Contemporary Chinese Painting from the Collection of Akiko Yamazaki and Jerry Yang, Cantor Arts Center, Stanford University, California, United States, 2018
- The Weight of Lightness: Ink Art at M+, M+ Pavilion, Hong Kong, China, 2017
- Boundless: Ongoing - Chinese Ink Art 2017, Art Museum of Sichuan Fine Arts Institute, Chongqing, China, 2017
- Different Paths: Explorations in Ink, S | 2 Sotheby's, New York, the United States, 2017
- Shanghai Ever, Museum of Contemporary Art, Shanghai, China, 2015
- China's Changing Landscape, the Amos Anderson Art Museum, Helsinki, Finland, 2015
- The Wondrous All: Leading Edge of Eastern Thought, Taipei Fine Arts Museum, Taiwan, 2015
- Shuimo: Ten Thousand Blossoms Spring, S | 2 Sotheby's, New York, the United States, 2015
- China's Changing Landscape, Nordic Watercolour Museum, Skarhamn, Sweden, 2014
- Contemporary Ink, NanHai Art, San Francisco, the United States, 2014
- Meditations in Nature: New Ink, Ben Brown Fine Arts, Hong Kong, China, 2014
- Shuimo / Water Ink: Enchanted Landscapes, S | 2 Sotheby's, New York, the United States, 2014
- The Moment for Ink, Silicon Valley Asian Art Center, California, the United States, 2013
- Illusion / Image: Contemporary Chinese Ink Art Series 1, Hive Center for Contemporary Art, Beijing, China, 2013
- Shuimo / Water Ink: Chinese Contemporary Ink Paintings, S | 2 Sotheby's, New York, the United States, 2013
- Beyond Tradition - Chinese Contemporary Ink, Christie's, New York, the United States, 2013
- Chinese Contemporary Ink – The Beginnings and Beyond, Christie's, Hong Kong, China, 2013
- Ink: The Art of China, Saatchi Gallery, London, the United Kingdom, 2012
- The Chinese Scholar – Ink Painting and Works of Art, New York Asia Week, Fuller Building, New York, the United States, 2012
- Subtle Ink, Gallery 100, Taiwan, 2012
- Fresh Ink: Ten Takes on Chinese Tradition, Museum of Fine Arts, Boston, the United States, 2010
- Beyond Reminiscence, Beijing Center for the Arts, Beijing, China, 2008
- The Third Chengdu Biennale: Reboot, New International Convention Center of Chengdu, Chengdu, China, 2007
- Infinite Shades, Art Institute of Chicago, the United States, 2007
- 20th Century Chinese Landscape, Shanghai Art Museum, Shanghai, China, 2006
- The New Chinese Landscape, Arthur M. Sackler Museum, Harvard University, Cambridge, the United States, 2006
- Land_Scapes, Shanghai Gallery of Art, Shanghai, China, 2004
- The Second Contemporary Landscape Painting Invitational Exhibition, Shanghai Art Museum, Shanghai, China, 2004
- Contemporary Landscape Painting Invitational Exhibition, Liu Haisu Art Museum, Shanghai, China, 2002
- Seven Chinese Artists from North America: An Invitational Exhibition, Duo Yun Xuan, Shanghai, China, 2001
- In Concert: Landscapes by Li Huayi and Zhang Hong, Kaikodo, New York, the United States, 1999
- China 5000 Years, Guggenheim Museum, New York, the United States, 1998
- Wege ins Paradies - Oder Die Liebe Zum Stein in China, Rietberg Museum, Zurich, Switzerland, 1998

== Collections ==
Li Huayi's works are widely collected by worldwide museums and institutions including:

- British Museum, London, UK
- Asian Art Museum of San Francisco, San Francisco, USA
- Los Angeles County Museum of Art, Los Angeles, United States
- Brooklyn Museum, New York, USA
- Cleveland Museum of Art, Ohio, USA
- Honolulu Museum of Art, Hawaii, USA
- Harvard Art Museums-Arthur M. Sackler Museum, Massachusetts, USA
- Art Institute of Chicago, Chicago, USA
- Spencer Museum of Art, University of Kansas, USA
- University of Kansas, Kansas, USA
- Art Gallery of New South Wales, Sydney, Australia
- Suzhou Museum, Suzhou, China
- M+, Hong Kong, China
- Hong Kong Museum of Art, Hong Kong, China

== Publications ==
- Infinities Between Ink and Gold - Catalogue Raisonné of the Gilded Works by Li Huayi 2008-2021, Hong Kong, Kwai Fung Art Publishing House: 2022. ISBN 978-988-15623-0-2
- KWAI Catherine and FUNG Edward, Li Huayi: Landscapes from a Master’s Heart, Monograph, Milan, Italy: Rizzoli International Publications Inc., First Edition: June 2018 and Hong Kong: Kwai Fung Art Publishing, 2017. ISBN 978-88-918163-7-5.
- FUNG Edward, Exotica: Latest Works of LI Huayi, Publication, Hong Kong, Kwai Fung Art Publishing House: March 2016. ISBN 978-988-15623-7-1.
- Waterfalls, Rocks and Bamboo by Li Huayi, Exhibition Catalogue, London, UK: Eskenazi, 2014. ISBN 978-1873609361.
- Li Huayi, Exhibition Catalogue for “Associated Exhibition of Contemporary Ink Painting by Li Huayi and Li Jin”, Taipei, Taiwan: Gallery 100, September 2012.
- Li Huayi, Exhibition Catalogue, Hong Kong, Beijing Center for the Arts Publishing House: 2011. ISBN 978-988-18150-6-4.
- LI Huayi, The Twelve Animals of the Zodiac, London, UK, Eskenazi: 1 November 2011. ISBN 9781873609347.
- Trees, Rocks, Mist and Mountains, Exhibition Catalogue, London, UK: Eskenazi, 2010. ISBN 978-1873609323.
- MAUDSLEY Catherine, Li Huayi at 60: Paintings in the Yiqingzhai Collection, Exhibition Catalogue, Hong Kong: The Ink Society, 2008.
- Mountain Landscapes by Li Huayi, Exhibition Catalogue, London, UK: Eskenazi, 2007. ISBN 1-873609-23X.
- KNIGHT Dr. Michael J., and LI Huayi, The Monumental Landscapes of Li Huayi, Exhibition Catalogue, San Francisco, USA: Asian Art Museum of San Francisco, 2004. ISBN 978-0939117260.
- In Concert: Landscapes by Li Huayi and Zhang Hong, Exhibition Catalogue, Hong Kong: Kaikodo, 1999. ISBN 962-7956-22-8.
- The Landscapes of Li Huayi, Exhibition Catalogue, Hong Kong, Kaikodo: 1997. ISBN 962-7956-07-4.
- Suzhou Museum, Fantasies on Paper and Enchantments in Gold, Exhibition Catalogue, China: Jiangsu, 2017.
- SMITH Thomas E., Li Huayi Landscape Paintings (1993-95), Anthology, Hong Kong, Wu's Studio, Artlink: 1996. ISBN 962-7287-30-X, OCLC 62142782.
