= Herman Menzel =

American painter

Herman Erwin Menzel (1904–1988) was a Modernist American painter.

He was the son of a German Lutheran Pastor and grew up in Chicago, where he attended the Chicago Academy of Design and the National Academy of Art. He married Willa Hamm, a commercial artist, in 1933, with whom he shared a Chicago studio and had a son, Sewall.

Menzel exhibited at the Art Institute of Chicago between 1927 and 1939 but became progressively deaf and gradually withdrew from the Chicago art scene, moving in 1933 to live with his wife at her family home in Winnetka. There he painted alone while his wife commuted to work in Chicago. In the late 1930s he bought an island in Rainy Lake on the Minnesota-Ontario border, where he built a cabin, fished and painted. His work from this period became more representational, emphasising the insignificance of human figures in a wild landscape.

== Selected works ==
- Untitled, 1928 (Aaron Galleries) Artnet
- The White Horse, 1929 (Art Institute of Chicago) Artic
- Catskill Pasture, 1929 (Aaron Galleries) Artnet
- Harvest from my Garden, c.1950 (Aaron Galleries) Artnet
- Rainy Day, Fishing on the Northern Lake, 1952 (Aaron Galleries) Artnet
