= Ciphers and Constellations, in Love with a Woman =

1941 painting by Joan Miró

Ciphers and Constellations in Love with a Woman
- Artist: Joan Miró
- Year: 1941
- Type: watercolor and gouache with pencil
- Dimensions: 46 cm × 38 cm (18 in × 15 in)
- Location: Art Institute of Chicago; Chicago

Ciphers and Constellations in Love with a Woman (Catalan: Xifrats i constellacions, en l'amor amb una dona) is a painting by Joan Miró created in 1941, in Palma, Spain. The medium is gouache, watercolor, and graphite on paper, and the work's dimensions are 46 cm × 38 cm (18 in × 15 in). It is in the Art Institute of Chicago, Chicago, Illinois, USA. It is one of the 23 pieces in Miró's Constellations series.

The work was first exhibited in 1945, in the Pierre Matisse Gallery after the gallery had acquired it in 1944. In 1953, the Art Institute of Chicago acquired the painting.

The painting inspired a poem of the same title by Ruth Moon Kempher.
