= Evelyn Statsinger =

American artist

- Born: 1927; Brooklyn, New York, United States
- Died: February 13, 2016 (aged 88–89); Chicago, Illinois, United States
- Education: High School of Music & Art, Art Students League, School of the Art Institute of Chicago
- Known for: drawing, painting, sculpture, photogram
- Style: Surrealism, Monster Roster

Evelyn Statsinger (1927–2016) was a multidisciplinary American artist. Born and raised in Brooklyn, she moved to Chicago in the mid-1940s and remained there for the rest of her life. Statsinger earned her BA in art education at the School of the Art Institute of Chicago (SAIC) in 1949 after short stints at the Art Students League and the University of Toledo. While still a student at SAIC she found early success in the Exhibition Momentum salons—a series of exhibitions that took place from 1948 through 1957 and included artist Josef Albers, architect Ludwig Mies van der Rohe, and art critic Clement Greenburg, among others, on its three-person jury. This helped lead to her first solo exhibition at the Art Institute of Chicago in 1952. Often identified with the Monster Roster group, Statsinger features prominently in exhibitions and publications devoted to art in Chicago. Her work is included in the collections of the Whitney Museum of American Art, the Art Institute of Chicago and the Smithsonian American Art Museum.
