= The Cliff Walk at Pourville =

1882 painting by Claude Monet

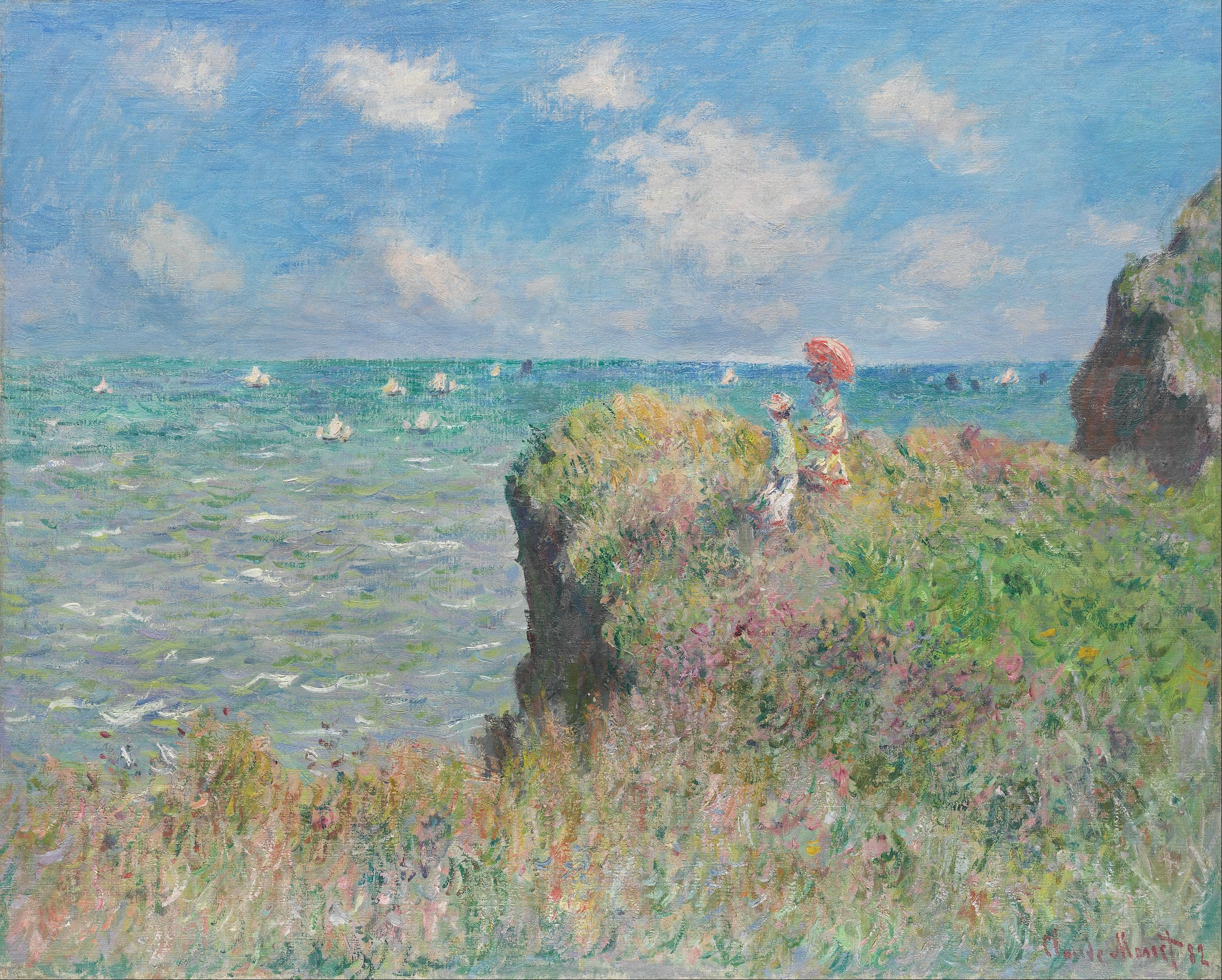
- The Cliff Walk at Pourville
- Artist: Claude Monet
- Year: 1882
- Medium: Oil on canvas
- Dimensions: 66.5 cm × 82.3 cm (26 1/8 in × 32 7/16 in)
- Location: Art Institute of Chicago

Low Tide at Pourville (1882), another painting in Monet's series of the cliffs at Pourville

The Cliff Walk at Pourville is an 1882 painting by the French Impressionist painter Claude Monet, displayed in the Art Institute of Chicago. It is one in a series of landscape paintings by Monet during his time in Normandy. It depicts two girls atop a cliff overlooking the sea in fishing village Pourville, in a scene of summer sunshine and brisk breeze which juxtaposes leisure and labor by contrasting the bourgeois figures with fishing boats on the horizon.

== Context ==
Cliff Walk at Pourville shows two figures in dresses standing atop a grassy cliff overlooking the English Channel. The canvas was inspired by an extended stay at Pourville in 1882, during which Monet was retreating from personal and professional pressures. His wife Camille had died three years earlier, and France was experiencing an economic recession which was affecting his art sales. During this retreat, Monet was able to develop his Impressionist style through a series of paintings using the scenery as his background. Monet settled in the village between February and mid-April, during which time he wrote to his future wife, Alice Hoschedé, "How beautiful the countryside is becoming, and what joy it would be for me to show you all its delightful nooks and crannies!" They returned in June of that year. The two young girls standing atop the cliff may be Hoschedé's daughters, Marthe and Blanche; it has also been suggested that the figures represent Alice and Blanche.

== Interpretations ==
The painting depicts two figures on the cliffs of Pourville; however, there are several overlapping interpretations about the significance of the two figures in the painting. One popular interpretation is that the piece works to juxtapose labour and leisure through the permanent fishermen on the horizon and the temporary bourgeois figures on the cliff. Another interpretation is that the women help characterize summertime and seashore vacations, contributing to the formation of a vacation picture where any signs of work or the city are absent. Their existence ensures that the audience cannot picture themselves alone in the scene, in which case viewers may forget about the prevalence of tourism on the coast. In this manner, the figures act as intermediaries between the audience and the scene. In both of these interpretations, the figures serve as important reminders about the interplay between tourism and the landscape.

== Technique ==
=== Brushwork ===
Monet's brushwork technique in this painting helps demonstrate the drama of the landscape. Dynamic brushstrokes were used to paint the grasses on the cliff, the girls' drapery, and the distant sea. A sense of movement suggested by painterly calligraphy was a property of Monet's work in the 1880s, and is here used to connote the energy of nature and the effect of a summer wind upon figures and clothing, land, water, and clouds moving across the sky. This dynamic and loose brushwork was well-suited for depicting a windy day on the coast. Furthermore, his brushwork and use of light infuses the piece with a balance of brightness, shadows, and reflections to define the landscape and atmospheric qualities. Through this unified brushwork, along with texture and color, Monet was able to insert the two figures into the landscape without disrupting the overall unity of the landscape and piece.

=== Composition balance ===
During the painting process, Monet reduced the size of a rocky promontory at the far right of the canvas to better balance the composition's proportions, in particular the sea and sky. It has also been noted that this secondary cliff was a late addition to the painting, and was not part of the original design. The inclusion of another cliff top produces a second shadow mass, providing a balancing accent on the right side of the canvas. This balancing allows the two figures to be framed between the two shadows. Furthermore, an X-ray of the painting indicates that the artist originally painted a third figure into the grouping, then removed it. The omission of this figure emphasizes the solitude of the remaining figures in the setting.

=== Perspective ===
Describing similar works by the artist, art historian John House wrote, “His cliff tops rarely show a single sweep of terrain. Instead there are breaks in space; the eye progresses into depth by a succession of jumps; distance is expressed by planes overlapping each other and by atmospheric rather than linear perspective — by softening the focus and changes of color.” Supporting this idea, most of the paintings in the Pourville series look in a north-easterly direction, pitching an uneven line of the cliff edge against the flatness of the sea. Cliff Walk at Pourville is split roughly at a diagonal and looks out at a 45 degree angle, which provides a view of the bluff in a step formation, rising from the lower left up to the top right. The juxtapositions of the cliff and the sea, along with the contrast between the ground and the openness of the sea and sky, heightens the sense of immediacy in the piece.

See also

- List of paintings by Claude Monet
