= Yamaguchi Sekkei =

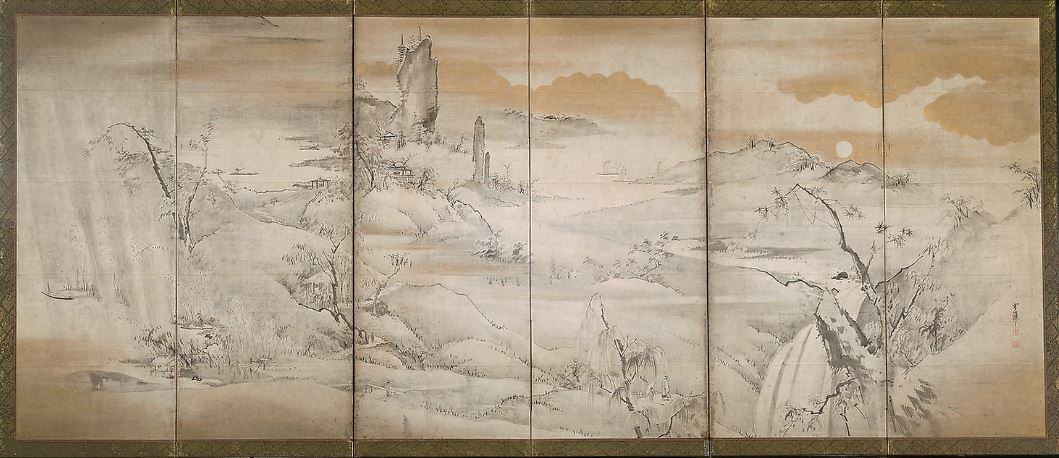
From Eight Views of the Xiao and Xiang Rivers (right: "Autumn Moon over Dongting Lake", left: "Night Rain on the Xiao and Xiang")

Yamaguchi Sekkei (Japanese: 山口雪渓) also known as Yamaguchi Sōsetsu (山口宗雪) (1644/48, Kyoto - 22 October 1732, Kyoto) was a Japanese artist of the middle Edo period. He sometimes went under the names Baian (梅庵) or Hakuin (白隠).

== Life and work ==
Although his year of birth is generally considered to be 1644, documents at Kiyomizu-dera suggest that it may have been 1648 or even 1649.

It has been said that he was a great admirer of the artists Muqi (Chinese:牧谿) or "Mokkei" in Japanese, and Sesshū (雪舟) and that he created his art name by combining characters from both of their names. It is also believed that he was a student of Kanō Einō.

He didn't paint in the prevailing styles of his time, but rather used traditional styles to create his own. Among his best known works are a pair of screens depicting "Autumnal Maples" in Daigo-ji, which were shown in Berlin in 1939 as part of the Exhibition of Japanese Art. They are registered as an Important Cultural Property.

Also notable are the murals in the Myōshin-ji. They comprise fifteen landscapes with figures, sixteen scenes with flowers and birds and twelve portraits of Buddhist saints. They are not accessible to the public.
