= Victor Huguet =

French painter

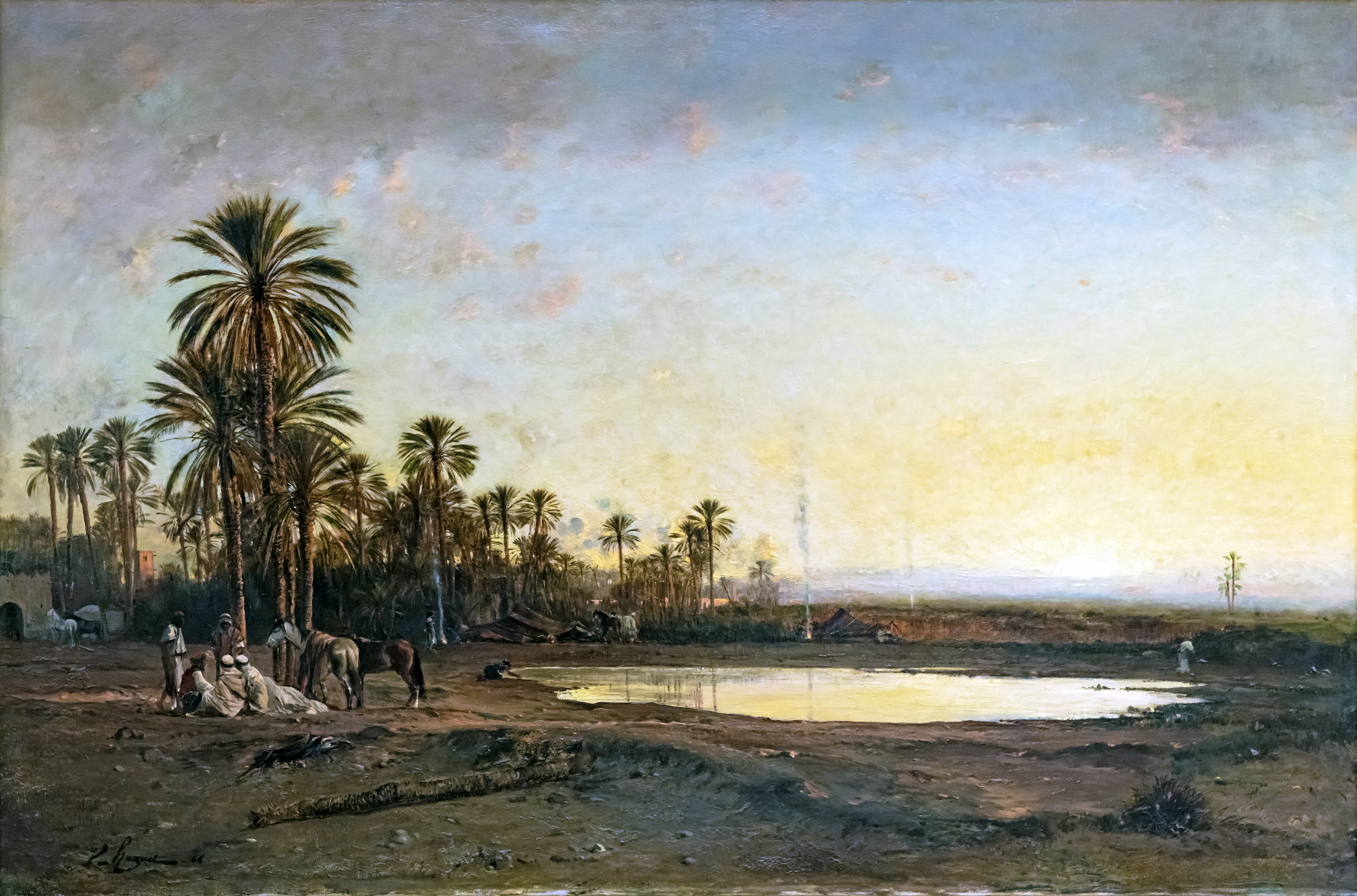
At the Edge of the Oasis

Victor-Pierre Huguet (1 May 1835, Le Lude – 16 August 1902, Paris) was a French Orientalist painter.

== Biography ==
He studied at the École supérieure des beaux-arts de Marseille with Émile Loubon, who specialized in landscapes with animals. Later, he studied with the Orientalist painter Eugène Fromentin in Paris. He took his first trip to Egypt in 1852. The following year, he accompanied the marine painter, Jean-Baptiste Henri Durand-Brager on his expedition to paint scenes from the Crimean War.

In 1859, he debuted simultaneously at the Salon in Marseille and the Paris Salon. After 1893, he was a regular exhibitor at the Société des Peintres Orientalistes Français. To gather material and inspiration for his works, he made numerous trips to Libya, Egypt, Istanbul and Algeria, which became his favorite destination.

Over the years, his color palette brightened and his brush style became freer.

He died in Paris in 1902, aged sixty-seven. His works may be seen at museums in Nîmes, Montpellier and Marseille.
