= Ken Boyd =

Ken Boyd may refer to:

- Ken Boyd (basketball) (born 1952), American basketball player
- Ken Boyd (footballer) (born 1938), Australian rules football player
- Ken Boyd (politician) (born 1947), Virginia politician
- Kenneth Boyd, founder of thinktank Boyd Group
