= Feminist foreign policy =

Strategy integrated into the policies and practices of a state to promote gender equality

Feminist foreign policy, or feminist diplomacy, is a strategy integrated into the policies and practices of a state to promote gender equality, and to help improve women's access to resources, basic human rights, and political participation. It can often be bucketed into three categories: rights, resources, and representation. The concept was first coined and integrated into governmental policy by Margot Wallström, former Swedish Foreign Affairs Minister. The objectives of feminist foreign policy include (but are not limited to):

- The fight against sexual and sexist violence;
- The education of women and girls, and that of men and boys;
- The economic emancipation of women across the world;
- Involving women in politics and decision-making;
- Involving women in peace negotiations and treaties

One action taken by Wallström was to create a global network of women peace negotiators, as women are often not invited to the negotiating table, despite their informal mediation roles in many communities. Including women in peace negotiations makes peace agreements more likely to last. Involving women in peace negotiations has been proven to have significant positive effects such as a lower likelihood of the country breaking out into conflict again, and greater buy-in from the population as a whole. In fact, a statistical analysis of 182 signed peace agreements between 1989 and 2011 revealed peace agreements where women are involved are "35% more likely to last for fifteen years".

== Diffusion in the world ==
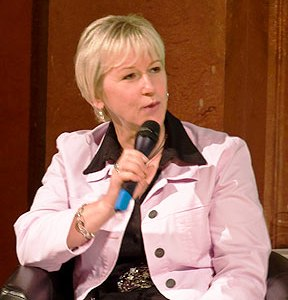
Margot Wallström, the Swedish Foreign Affairs Minister who introduced the concept of feminist foreign policy

Since May 2011, 45 states and the European Union have ratified the Istanbul Convention, a human rights treaty by the Council of Europe, aiming to prevent violence, to protect victims and to end the impunity of perpetrators. Gender equality is one of the 17 Sustainable Development Goals that were established by the United Nations in 2015. In order to achieve this broad, universal goal, specific targets were put in place. Among them, target 5.5 is: "Ensure women's full and effective participation and equal opportunities for leadership at all levels of decision-making in political, economic and public life." In order to achieve this target, the indicators put in place are:

- 5.5.1: Proportion of seats held by women in national parliaments and local governments
- 5.5.2: Proportion of women in managerial positions

In his speech on 27 February 2020, the UN Secretary General António Guterres promoted the importance of women being in positions of political leadership in all areas of governance. He stated:

... women's representation in government is not about stereotypical "women's issues" like opposing sexual harassment or promoting childcare. Women in government drive social progress and meaningful changes to people’s lives. Women are more likely to advocate for investment in education and health; and to seek cross-party consensus and common ground. When the numbers of women reach a critical mass, governments are more likely to innovate, and to challenge established orthodoxies. In other words, women in politics are redefining and redistributing power. It is no coincidence that the governments that are redefining GDP to include wellbeing and sustainability are led by women. It is simple math.

In October 2022, Tobias Billstrom, the foreign minister of the new Swedish prime minister Ulf Kristersson's cabinet, announced the reversal of Sweden's feminist foreign policy. Rachel A. George argued in Foreign Policy that the feminist foreign policy will remain influential because the new Swedish government still maintains a public commitment to women's rights, cuts to aid on gender equality may risk backlash from voters, and feminist foreign policy has spread to multiple countries including Canada (2017), France (2019), Mexico (2020), Spain (2021), Luxembourg (2021), Germany (2021), and Chile (2022).

=== European Union ===
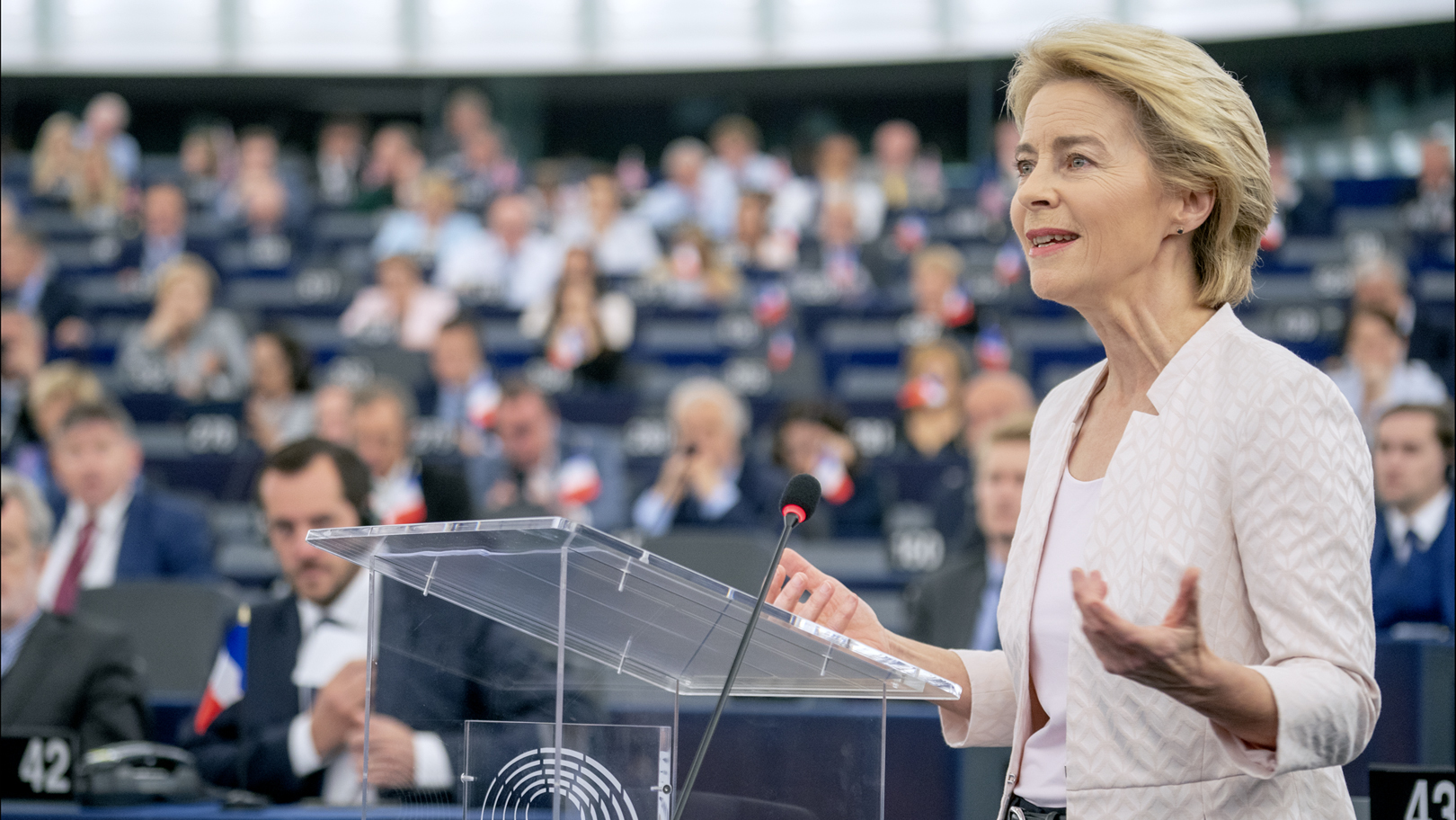
Ursula von der Leyen became in 2019 the first woman to hold the position of the President of the European Commission.

The issue of equal representation has been at the forefront of the European agenda during the last couple of years. The current President of the European Commission, Ursula von der Leyen, became in 2019 the first woman to ever hold this position, making gender balance the cornerstone of her presidency. Since September 2020, the College of Commissioners consists of 13 female and 14 male members. In March 2020, the European Commission presented the Gender Equality Strategy for 2020–2025, which set a series of key actions in order to ensure equal perspective in all aspects of EU policy areas. As the President of the European Commission, Ursula von der Leyen, noted:

Gender equality is a core principle of the European Union, but it is not yet a reality. In business, politics and society as a whole, we can only reach our full potential if we use all of our talent and diversity. Using only half of the population, half of the ideas or half of the energy is not good enough. With the Gender Equality Strategy, we are pushing for more and faster progress to promote equality between men and women.

In the European External Action Service, the main agency responsible for European foreign policy, women only account for 31.3% of middle-management positions and 26% of senior management positions, compared to 40% at the European Commission and the European Parliament. Regarding the key position of the High Representative of the European Union for Foreign Affairs and Security Policy, three individuals have held this title since its creation by the Treaty of Lisbon in 2009, the two of them women: Catherine Ashton (2009–2014) and Federica Mogherini (2014–2019). In November 2019, Christine Lagarde became the first woman President of the European Central Bank. In October 2020, a report pushing for gender equality in EU foreign policy was approved in the European Parliament, with 477 MEPs in favor, 112 against, and 94 absentees. The report calls for a minimum of 50 percent women in all decision-making positions and 85 percent of European Union (EU) development assistance to be set aside for programs specifically supporting gender equality.

=== France ===
The first woman to be named diplomat in France was Suzanne Borel, passing the entrance exam to the French Foreign Ministry in 1930. Despite passing the exam, she was barred from accessing several departments reserved for men. She was only allowed to work in the Paris offices of the minister. Marcelle Campana was the first woman to become French ambassador in 1972, serving in Panama. The following year, the number of women working in the field of diplomacy started growing, but they were still given modest positions. During the 1980s and 1990s, the majority of women diplomats representing France were posted in moderately powerful countries or countries with whom the French state had no privileged relationships. European affairs represented an exception where French women could access important positions. For example, Simone Veil and Nicole Fontaine were elected as Presidents of the European Parliament. Christiane Scrivener and Edith Cresson served also as commissioners. A woman was nominated for the Ministry of Defence, currently known as Ministry of Armed Forces and the Ministry of Foreign Affairs respectively in 2002 and 2010, with Michèle Alliot-Marie as minister. She is still the only woman who served as Minister of Foreign Affairs.

In May 2017, the French president Emmanuel Macron declared gender equality as a pillar of his presidency. His government pledged 120 million € for to the French Development Agency, money aimed to help feminist movements and NGOs to fight for gender equality around the world. On 13 March 2018, during the opening of the 62nd session of the Commission on the Status of Women (CSW), Marlène Schiappa, the Secretary of State for Gender Equality, announced that France wanted to prioritise gender equality issues in the world. She announced that 50% of development aid funding would target projects in favor of equality between girls and boys before 2022 and an additional funding of 10 million euros in favor of "She decides" initiative, fighting for sexual and reproductive health and rights. In September 2018, Emmanuel Macron called for an international mobilisation against femicides during the opening session of the 73rd General Assembly of the UN. In March 2019, Marlene Schiappa and Jean-Yves le Drian, Minister of Foreign Affairs, published an Op-ed in Libération declaring France's pursuit of gender equality should lead the way for gender equality in the world. In the meantime, women are still a minority in French diplomacy. By March 2019, only a fourth of French diplomats were women.

=== United States ===
U.S. foreign policy began to include women's issue on its agenda from the 1970s as the feminist movement was gaining momentum domestically. Under the Carter administration from 1977 to 1981, defence of human rights was established as a foreign policy pillar and an office dedicated to the role of women in development was set up at United States Agency for International Development in 1994. The turning point came in 1995 at Beijing, where then First Lady of the U.S. Hillary Clinton rebuked the Chinese government's denial and women's autonomy and reproductive freedom declaring: "Human rights are women's rights, and women's rights are human rights." She called for a future in which, "every woman is treated with respect and dignity" during a speech for the Fourth United Nations World Conference on Women. This statement has inspired many and has been regularly taken up by Margot Wallström. Clinton has thus been credited for bringing women to the center of US foreign policymaking by recognizing and institutionalizing the link between women's status and attainment of national security objectives. Moreover, Hudson and Leidl refer to it as a "watershed event for the U.S. and arguably for the entire world", and explains how she establishes what is now conceptualized as the Hillary Doctrine, wherein Hillary Clinton set out principles of feminist foreign policy including, condemnation of rape as a weapon of war and calls to end gender discrimination, that facilitated the passing of the United Nations Security Council Resolution 1325 in 2000, which recognized the critical role of women in peace and security matters. The resolution called for countries to integrate women into foreign policymaking and urged journalists and activists to ensure women were being invited to participate in major international meetings and negotiations.

During the presidency of Bill Clinton, with the help of Secretary of State Madeleine Albright and others, Hillary Clinton publicized and published sexual violence during the Balkan wars and drew attention to the Serbian military and their brutal acts. In 2001, the State Department initiated its annual Trafficking in Persons Report, which ranked states based on tolerance of crime that disproportionately victimizes women. As the Secretary of State from 2009 to 2013 under the Obama administration, Hillary Clinton sought to reinforce the notion that women's well-being and interests could play a significant role in U.S. national security policy. In 2009, she elevated the State Department's Office of Global Women's Issues so that it would report directly to her and increased its budget. During the same year, Clinton launched a strategic plan for the State Department and USAID, the Quadrennial Diplomacy and Development Review to incorporate women into its policy proposal. The report proclaimed that "the status of the world's women is not simply an issue of morality – it is a matter of national security" and from it came policy initiatives that ranged from health, nutrition, violence against women, data collection about women, and child marriage among other issues. Indeed, Clinton spurred projects aimed at women's advancement and gave a framework for which diplomats and advocates could invoke to support their work. Yet, the impact of her efforts in societies such as Guatemala and Saudi Arabia, where sexism and patriarchy is deeply embedded, posed as a challenge. At times, Clinton had to willingly subordinate women's right to other diplomatic and security interests to maintain her role as a credible Secretary of State. Under the Biden administration, the first female Vice President Kamala Harris announced that they will pursue a "comprehensive plan" that provides opportunities and protects the rights of women everywhere.

=== New Zealand ===
New Zealand was the first country to give women voting rights in 1893 and was also ranked ninth out of 144 countries on gender equality according to the Global Gender Gap Index 2016 by the World Economic Forum. Yet, its Prime Minister Jacinda Ardern emphasized how "there is no room for complacency", and that the country will continue to work towards supporting girls and women in education, ending domestic violence and closing the pay gap. Ardern was praised internationally for her government's efficient response to COVID-19 along with other female leaders including, Taiwan President Tsai Ing-wen and German Chancellor Angela Merkel, further underlining the importance of a feminist foreign policy to the world.

=== Mexico and Latin America ===
After Mexican Foreign Affairs Minister Marcelo Ebrard pledged Mexico would adopt a feminist foreign policy in 2019, the Mexican government announced its commitment to do so in early 2020, becoming the first country in the Latin America to make such a commitment. Mexico is also the first country in the Global South to adopt a feminist foreign policy. The country's strategy, which will first be implemented through the 2020–2024 term, revolves around 5 axes: “a foreign policy with a gender perspective, and a feminist agenda abroad; parity within the Foreign Ministry; a Foreign Ministry free of violence that is safe for all; Visible equality; and feminism in all areas of the Foreign Ministry.”. According to Lyric Thompson, director of policy and advocacy at the International Center for Research on Women, this strategy represents a sound commitment thanks to a set timeline of events and benchmarks the government is to follow. For example, it was stipulated the government would engage with the Mexican legislative chamber on the topic soon after the announcement of the strategy

Despite Mexico's internal struggles with violence against women, the country has pushed for other feminist initiatives according to Martha Delgado, Undersecretary for Multilateral Affairs and Human Rights at the Ministry of Foreign Affairs of Mexico. In the past, Mexico has led efforts to fight against gender discrimination in international fora such as the Organization of American States, or subsequent UNFCCC COP's. In line with other feminist foreign policy states, Mexico is organizing the now-delayed Generation Equality Forum, a Franco-Mexican initiative “to take stock of current efforts and make proposals on improving gender equality and gender rights”, 25 years after the Beijing World Conference on Women.

=== Canada ===
The Feminist International Assistance Policy (FIAP) was introduced in 2017 by Canada to eradicate poverty around the world through female empowerment. The Minister of International Development and La Francophonie, Marie-Claude Bibeau, created the policy during Justin Trudeau's first term as Prime Minister. Trudeau, who strived to create a gender-balanced cabinet, is a strong supporter of feminism. Bibeau, after consulting with 65 countries, created a policy that relied heavily on gender-equality to create prosperity. Her findings indicated that empowerment of women and girls and gender-equality would promote economic growth in the Global South.

The official statement made by the Minister of International Development reads, "Canada is adopting a Feminist International Assistance Policy that seeks to eradicate poverty and build a more peaceful, more inclusive and more prosperous world. Canada firmly believes that promoting gender equality and empowering women and girls is the most effective approach to achieving this goal". Keeping Canadian values in mind, the policy is said to support the Paris Agreement as well as the Sustainable Development Goals (SDG), a set of goals created by the United Nations in an effort to eradicate poverty by 2030. However, due to COVID-19 and the fundamental damage it has caused in the Global South, the SDG report indicates a sharp increase in poverty. Schools closing due to the pandemic negatively impacts the education of girls and women, which consequently, hinders the progress Canada's FIAP has made when it comes to gender-equality.

==== Action Areas ====
In efforts to reach the goals of eradicating poverty, increasing global prosperity, and empowering women and girls, Canada's Feminist International Assistance Policy (FIAP) identifies six key action areas:

- Gender equality and the empowerment of women and girls (core)
- Human dignity
- Growth that works for everyone
- Environment and climate action
- Inclusive governance
- Peace and security

Gender equality and the empowerment of women is FIAP's core action area. In this area, Canada addresses, among other things, women's rights, violence against women, and women in the public sector. With this action area at the core of FIAP, 15% of Canada's bilateral development aid will be invested into initiatives that empower women and girls. The action area of human dignity concerns itself with ensuring that low-income populations have access to basic needs. Such needs include education, food, water, and health care. Human dignity falls under the umbrella of female empowerment as women and girls often face more obstacles in fulfilling their basic needs. In this regard, FIAP emphasizes the importance of female access to reproductive health. In the following three years Canada has pledged that $650 million will be invested into programs that promote reproductive health such as abortion clinics, contraception distribution, and HIV/AIDS treatments.

Growth that works for everyone is an action area that focuses on creating opportunities that further allow women to participate and benefit from local economic growth. Such opportunities include financial literacy training and lobbying for policy reform. The environment and climate action action area addresses the effects of climate change on human livelihood, and particularly those of women as they are especially vulnerable to the negative effects of climate change. Initiatives in this area include including women in climate action discussions and providing women with funding to create innovative climate adaption techniques.

Action area 5 is dedicated to inclusive governance. In this context, accomplishing inclusive governance involves the foundation of democracy, human rights, peace, and strong institutions, among other things. FIAP promotes inclusive governance through supporting women's rights and increasing women's access to politics, justice, and civil society. The action area of peace and security focuses on fostering stability in states that are in/on the verge of violence, as well as improving peace policies such as the global women, peace, and security agenda. In line with FIAP's feminist lens, Canada seeks to improve peace and security through supporting female participation in peace-focused forums and organizations. Notable books on feminist foreign policy are Sex and World Peace by Valerie Hudson and Bananas, Beaches, and Bases by Cynthia Enloe.

=== Slovenia ===
Feminist foreign policy was introduced in Slovenia by Tanja Fajon, who at the time was the first woman to hold the position of Minister of Foreign Affairs. The idea was presented at the 26th Slovene diplomacy conference, which took place on January 25 and 26 2023 in Brdo pri Kranju, where Fajon announced changes of the official Slovenian foreign policy strategy. It also included a feminist foreign policy as one of its goals, which, according to Fajon, means advocating for gender equality.

== Bibliography ==
- Ditchburn, Jennifer. (2015) "Because it's 2015': Trudeau forms Canada's 1st gender-balanced cabinet". CBC. https://www.cbc.ca/news/politics/canada-trudeau-liberal-government-cabinet-1.3304590
- Global Affairs Canada (2017). Canada's Feminist International Assistance Policy (PDF). Canada. https://www.international.gc.ca/world-monde/assets/pdfs/iap2-eng.pdf?_ga=2.56881065.2069262427.1614322710-1454063643.1614322710
- Rao, Sheila, and Rebecca Tiessen. “Whose Feminism(s)? Overseas Partner Organizations’ Perceptions of Canada's Feminist International Assistance Policy.” International Journal 75, no. 3 (September 2020): 349–66. https://doi.org/10.1177/0020702020960120.
- United Nations (2020). The Sustainable Development Goals Report 2020 (PDF). https://unstats.un.org/sdgs/report/2020/The-Sustainable-Development-Goals-Report-2020.pdf
