= Political positions of Risa Hontiveros =

Political positions of Senator Risa Hontiveros

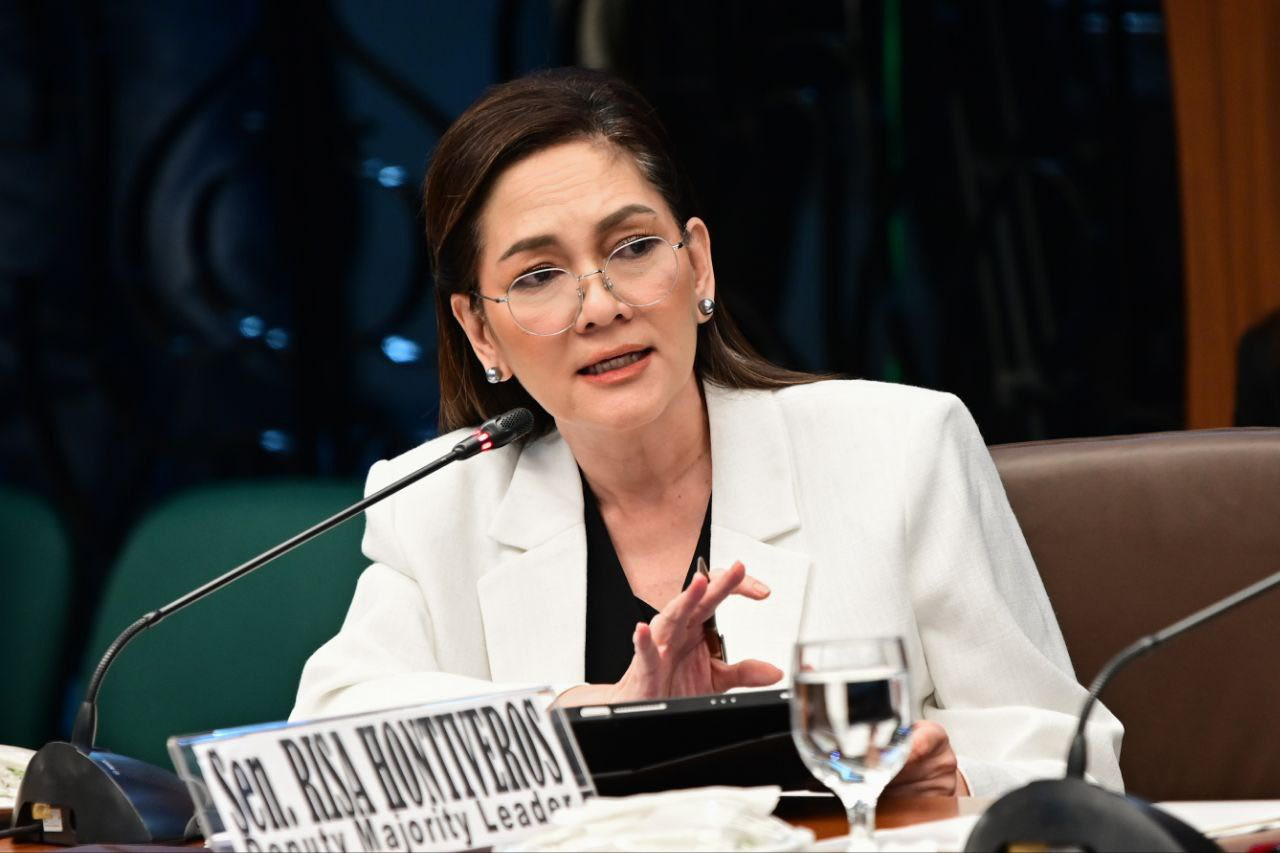
Hontiveros during Blue Ribbon Committee hearing on anomalous flood control projects on September 25, 2025.

Democracy is only meaningful if it is felt in the daily lives of ordinary people. We should continue to work that it be felt by our farmers, our fisherfolk, our workers, our OFWs, our every citizen.

— Hontiveros, April 19, 2026

Risa Hontiveros is a Filipino politician and social democrat serving as a senator of the Philippines since 2016. She is a member of the center-left and progressive party Akbayan. Throughout her political career, she has advocated policies relating to social welfare, public health, gender equality, labor rights, democratic governance, and Philippine sovereignty.

Political analyst Richard Heydarian identified Hontiveros as the "iron lady" of the progressive movement and a defining leader of the Philippine political opposition, where the platform of Hontiveros centers on three key pillars: conviction politics, progressive leadership, and pragmatic coalition building. Heydarian notes that Hontiveros rejects both macho populism and vacuous liberalism, running on a platform of strong social justice, public accountability, and human rights. He highlights her as the standard-bearer for liberal-progressive forces, championing feminist movements, reproductive rights, and protections for marginalized sectors. He established that Hontiveros is an effective, and pragmatic statesperson capable of building alliances and serving as a unifying figure for the democratic opposition ahead of major national elections.

== Social policy ==
=== Decriminalization of abortion ===
Hontiveros has expressed support for the decriminalization of abortion, stating that women should not be imprisoned for the procedure and emphasized the need to reduce the social stigma surrounding abortion in the Philippines. Calls for decriminalization of abortion increased after the release of the 2024 Filipino movie, Sunshine.

=== Divorce ===
Hontiveros has consistently supported the legalization of divorce throughout her life, and has filed bills that seek the release of spouses in abusive marriages. Her bills have garnered wide public support, and surveys showed that a majority of Filipino favor the legalization of divorce.

=== LGBTQ rights ===
Hontiveros is a consistent major advocate for the SOGIE Equality Bill and the Filipino LGBTQIA+ community. She participated in the early pride marches along with early champions of the anti-discrimination campaign. In June 2009, Hontiveros condemned the Commission on Election for its refusal to accredit the Filipino LGBT partylist, Ladlad. In 2014, as a private citizen, she marched in the streets to campaign for the passage of the SOGIE Bill. After being elected as senator in 2016, she immediately filed the SOGIE Bill and pursued the first Senate hearing on anti-discrimination legislation for the LGBTQ community. In 2017, the Safe Streets and Public Spaces Act of Hontiveros was passed in the Senate and enacted as law in 2019. The measure is the first legislation in Philippine history which recognized the LGBT community in its terminologies and within the legal system. The law criminalized street harassment and other forms of abuses. Hontiveros participated in various pride marches throughout her career, wherein in most cases, she was the only Filipino senator to participate in those events. In 2019, she rallied with 70,000 attendees. In 2023, she made a powerful speech of inclusion and called again for the passage of the SOGIE Bill. The numbers ballooned to 110,000 participants, the largest pride march in Southeast Asia.

=== Philippine drug war ===
Following the murders of Kian delos Santos, Carl Arnaiz, and Reynaldo de Guzman, Hontiveros vocally opposed President Duterte's drug war. She initiated Senate investigations into the police personnel involved in Delos Santos' killing and provided legal custody for witnesses, shielding them from potential police retaliation. These investigations exposed widespread extrajudicial killings that targeted civilians, including children, with some victims allegedly tortured and intentionally displayed to instill fear in communities. By 2018, reports estimated up to 30,000 deaths in Duterte's drug war. The investigations led by Hontiveros and her allies, as well as the reports made by veteran journalists, prompted the International Criminal Court to launch an investigation into the alleged crimes. In 2025, Duterte was arrested by the ICC and charged with crimes against humanity.

== Economic policy ==
Hontiveros opposed the establishment of the Maharlika Investment Fund, the proposed sovereign wealth fund for the Philippines. On May 31, 2023, she became the only senator who voted against the bill proposing its creation, which President Bongbong Marcos certified as urgent a week prior. Hontiveros explained that, while she believed that the country needed a new form of public financing, proposing a sovereign wealth fund was premature and more suitable in the medium term once the Philippine economy has commodity-based surpluses or surpluses from external trade from state-owned enterprises.

Hontiveros has expressed support for the redistribution of wealth in a 2024 Rolling Stone interview, stating that "it just makes economic sense." She tied these policies to building support amongst the poor for democracy.

== Foreign and security policy ==
=== China—Philippines relations ===
Hontiveros maintains a staunchly critical and assertive stance on China, consistently condemning Beijing's maritime aggression and undiplomatic behaviors. One of the most vocal advocates for Philippine sovereignty in the West Philippine Sea (WPS), Hontiveros was one of the first senators to criticize China for publicly attacking Philippine officials who defend Philippine national territory. She led the passing of the strongest Senate resolution which condemned the Chinese Embassy's undiplomatic activities toward Philippine institutions. She was the first modern senator to visit the Kalayaan Group of Islands (KIG), promoting better education and national awareness on the country's territories and the South China Sea Arbitration award which favored the Philippines. Hontiveros has filed resolutions demanding Beijing to pay reparations, intended to cover the cost of severe environmental destruction, including coral reef harvesting conducted by China. She has criticized the censorship and misinformation campaign being spread by the Chinese state apparatus, mostly covering maritime and sovereignty issues and political interference. She favors a ban on Chinese state-owned companies in the Philippines due to national security concerns, while sounding the alarm against Chinese investments in critical Philippine assets such as the exposed 40% stake of China in the National Grid Corporation of the Philippines (NGCP) and ownership stakes of China in the Philippine-based telecom company DITO. She warned these holdings expose the country to potential foreign espionage and infrastructure shutdowns.

=== United States ===
Hontiveros advocates for a balanced and pragmatic alliance with the United States on regional security while still firmly opposing US unilateral military actions. She also advocates for the civil rights of Filipinos living in America. Hontiveros has welcomed US support amid Chinese aggression in the West Philippine Sea, but maintains that the Philippines must not become a pawn in the geopolitical tug-of-war between China and the United States. Her position advocates for an independent foreign policy, prioritizing national interests without being entirely dependent on the US. Hontiveros is an outspoken critic of unilateral US military strikes overseas, which she has previously condemned and called as grave violations of international law. She has urged the US and its allies to pursue diplomatic negotiations rather than military escalations, particularly in Western Asia (Middle East). After American marine officer Joseph Scott Pemberton killed Filipina transgender woman Jennifer Laude in 2014, Hontiveros strongly condemned both the murder of Laude and the systemic impunity granted to Pemberton, while pushing for the reviewal of the Visiting Forces Agreement with the United States. In 2020, she also criticized the swift granting of the early release petition of Pemberton by a local court, stating that such privilege was "never accorded to many Filipinos", as well as the pardon granted by Duterte to Pemberton, which Hontiveros called "an affront to the Filipino people."

=== Other nations ===
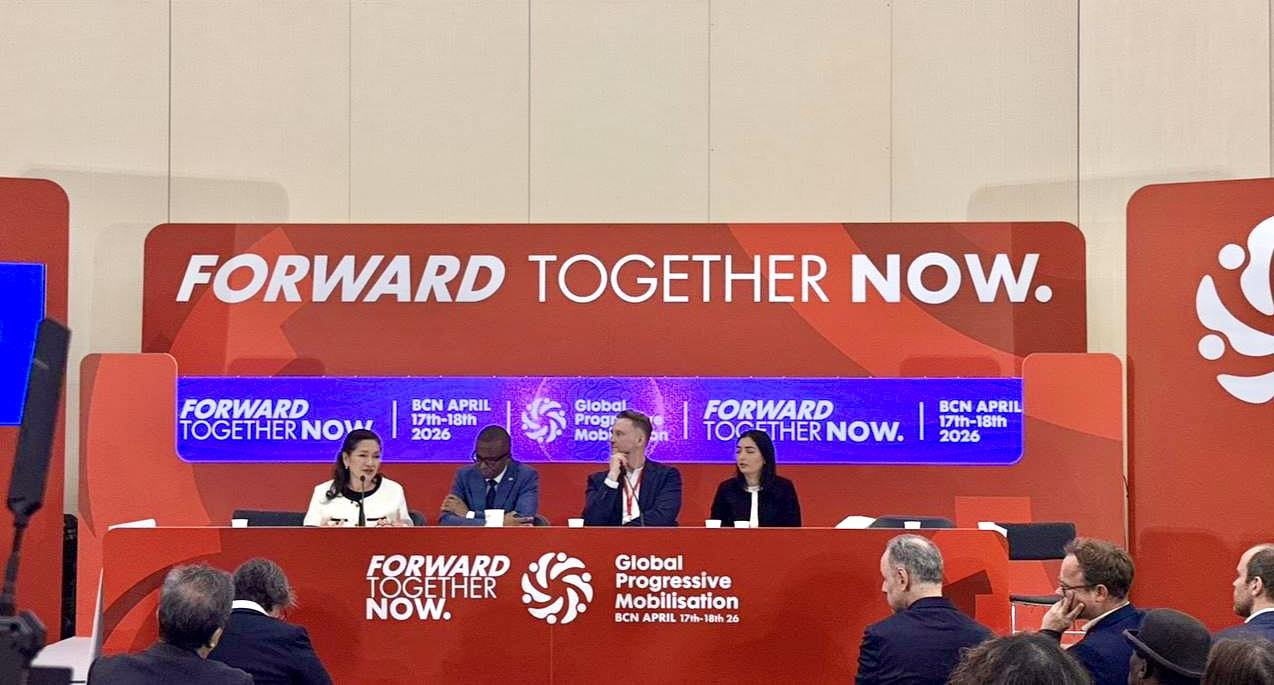
Hontiveros (left) on the panel discussion at the Global Progressive Mobilisation conference in Barcelona, 2026

Hontiveros has supported strengthening ties with ASEAN member states, Taiwan, and the Quadrilateral Security Dialogue composed of Australia, Japan, India, and the United States, among others. She has called for an international crackdown on syndicated crime in Southeast Asia conducted mostly by Chinese-affiliated groups, which have victimized thousands of locals in the region. Hontiveros, a firm supporter of democracy, was also a vocal critic of the military junta in Myanmar following the ouster of the civilian government. She has called for a peaceful resolution to the continuous West Asia conflicts, including the Gaza genocide and the 2026 Iran war, prioritizing humanitarian aid, civilian protection, and the safety of Filipinos in the region. Although initially friendly to both Israel and Palestine in support of the Philippine national position, her political position shifted after the bombings in Gaza Strip were reported. During the onslaught, she supported the maintenance of border crossings, so that vital goods such as medicines and food can go to Gaza. She stressed that existing aids are insufficient and called for more humanitarian corridors to protect trapped civilians, including Filipino workers. Hontiveros has backed immediate ceasefires, de-escalation, and a return to the negotiating table among the involved parties to resolve the root causes of the crisis. She has also backed calls to allow Palestinian refugees to enter the Philippines. In April 2026, Hontiveros joined world leaders at the Global Progressive Mobilisation in Barcelona, including Spanish prime minister Pedro Sánchez, Brazilian president Luiz Inácio Lula da Silva, and former Palestinian prime minister Mohammad Shtayyeh.
