= Washington Women's Art Center =

Feminist art collective in Washington, DC

- Formation: 1975
- Dissolved: 1988
- Purpose: Provide professional support and opportunities for women in the arts
- Location: Washington, D.C.

The Washington Women's Art Center (WWAC) was a nonprofit feminist art collective in Washington, D.C. It existed for over a decade, from 1975 to 1988.

== History ==
WWAC was founded in 1975 to support women in the arts. Inspired by ideas presented at the 1972 Conference of Women in the Visual Arts at the Corcoran Gallery of Art, Katharine Butler, Barbara Frank, Janis Goodman, Sarah Hyde, and Ann Leffler Slayton and Josephine Withers founded WWAC. It was originally located at 1821 Q Street NW. For a time WACC was located at the Lansburgh Cultural Center at 420 7th Street NW. In 1986 WWAC relocated to 6925 Willow Street, NW in the Takoma neighborhood. The same year the organization was renamed The New Art Center. The organization closed its doors in 1988.

The organization produced a newsletter entitled Womansphere. WWAC hosted collaboratively run workshops and exhibitions. Fees for membership and these events was the main source of funding for the organization.

In 1979, Nancy Cusick, as director of WWAC, was on the coordinating committee for the United Nations' International Festival of Women Artists held in Copenhagen as part of the World Conference on Women, 1980. In 1985 Cusick and WWAC participated in the Focus International held in Nairobi as part of the World Conference on Women, 1985.

== Legacy ==
The Washington Printmakers Gallery originated with a group of artists meeting at WWAC. The gallery’s first show was in May 1985.

In 2018 the American University Museum held a retrospective exhibition of WWAC entitled Latitude: The Washington Women's Arts Center 1975-1987. Also in 2018, as a companion to the Latitude exhibition, Lucy Blankstein and Ellouise Schoettler interviewed over a dozen WWAC alumni.

Materials from the Washington Women's Art Center are archived at the National Museum of Women in the Arts.
