= World Conference on Women, 1995 =

United Nations conference

Conference logo

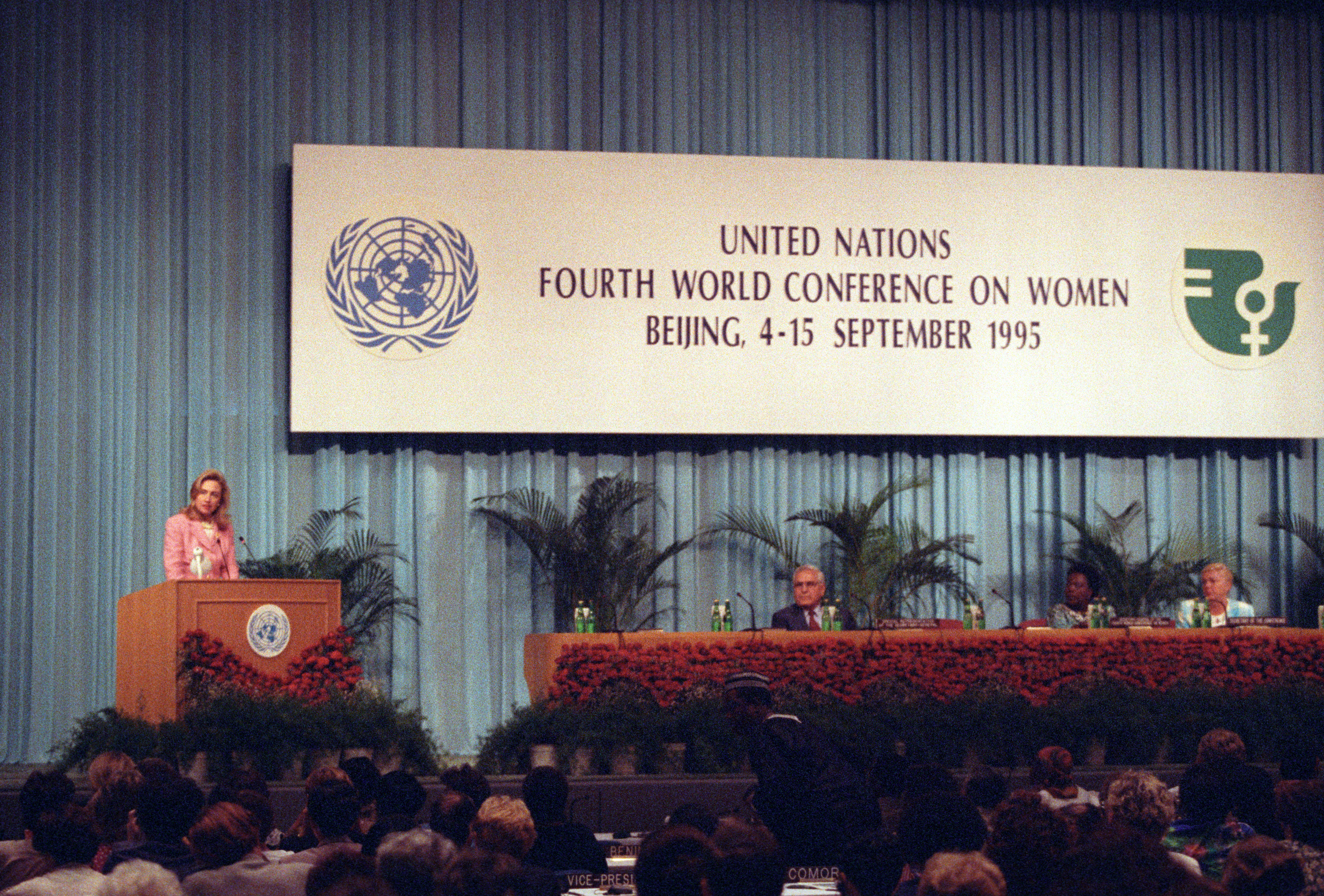
Hillary Clinton gives a speech during the conference

The Fourth World Conference on Women: Action for Equality, Development and Peace was the name given for a conference convened by the United Nations during 4–15 September 1995 in Beijing, China.

At this conference, governments from around the world agreed on a comprehensive plan to achieve global legal equality, known as the Beijing Platform for Action.

This Conference is a precursor to the so-called "feminist foreign policy".

== Background ==
The founding United Nations charter (1945) included a provision for equality between men and women (chapter III, article 8). Subsequently, from 1945 to 1975 various female officials within the United Nations and leaders of women's movements on the global stage attempted to turn these principles into action. The United Nations General Assembly passed a resolution (resolution 3010) that 1975 should be International Women's Year. In December 1975, the UN General Assembly passed a further resolution (resolution 31/136) that 1976–1985 should be the "Decade of Women".

=== First World Conference on Women, Mexico City, 1975 ===
In conjunction with International Women's Year, the first world conference on women was held in Mexico City in 1975. It resulted in the Declaration of Mexico on the Equality of Women and Their Contribution to Development and Peace.

=== Second World Conference on Women, Copenhagen, 1980 ===
The second world conference on women was held in Copenhagen in 1980. The conference agreed that the 1979 Convention on the Elimination of All Forms of Discrimination against Women was an important milestone. The Copenhagen conference also acknowledged the gap between rights being secured for women and women's ability to exercise those rights. It was also agreed that it was action on the three areas of: equal access to education; employment opportunities; and adequate health care services are essential to achieve the goals set out in Mexico.

=== Third World Conference on Women, Nairobi, 1985 ===
The third world conference on women was held in Nairobi in 1985. The Nairobi conference set out areas by which progress in women's equality could be measured: constitutional and legal measures; equality in social participation; equality in political participation; and decision-making. The conference also acknowledged that women need to participate in all areas of human activity, not just those areas that relate to gender.

=== Preceding the Fourth World Conference on Women, Beijing, 1995 ===
Delegates had prepared the UNDP Beijing Express Declaration aimed at achieving greater equality and opportunity for women.

== Attendees ==
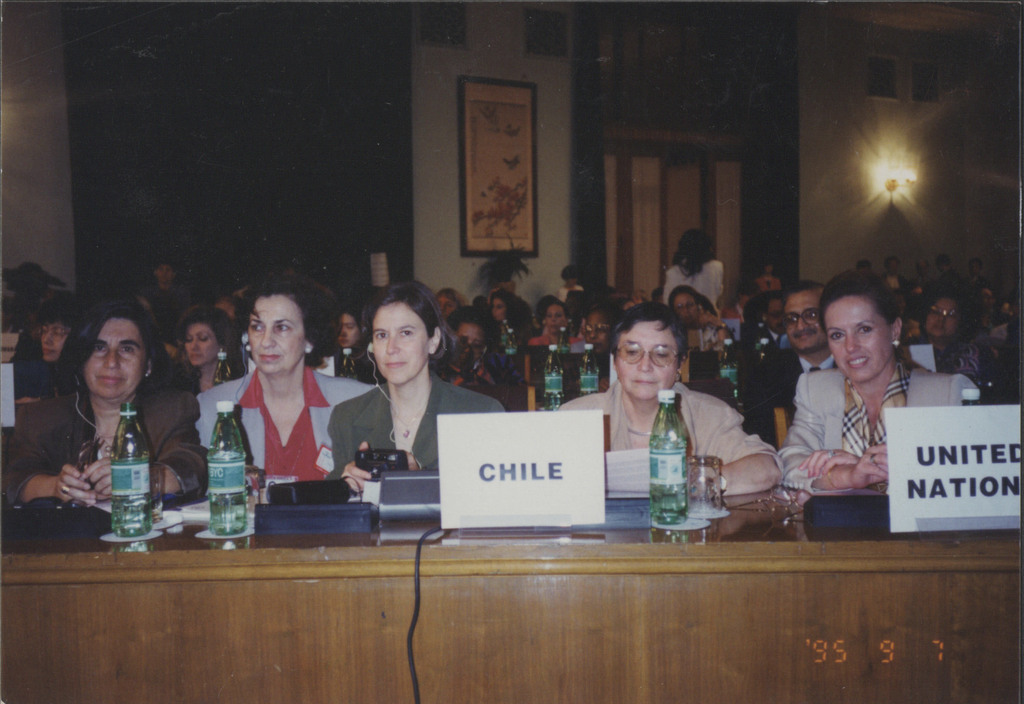
Chilean politicians attending the conference.

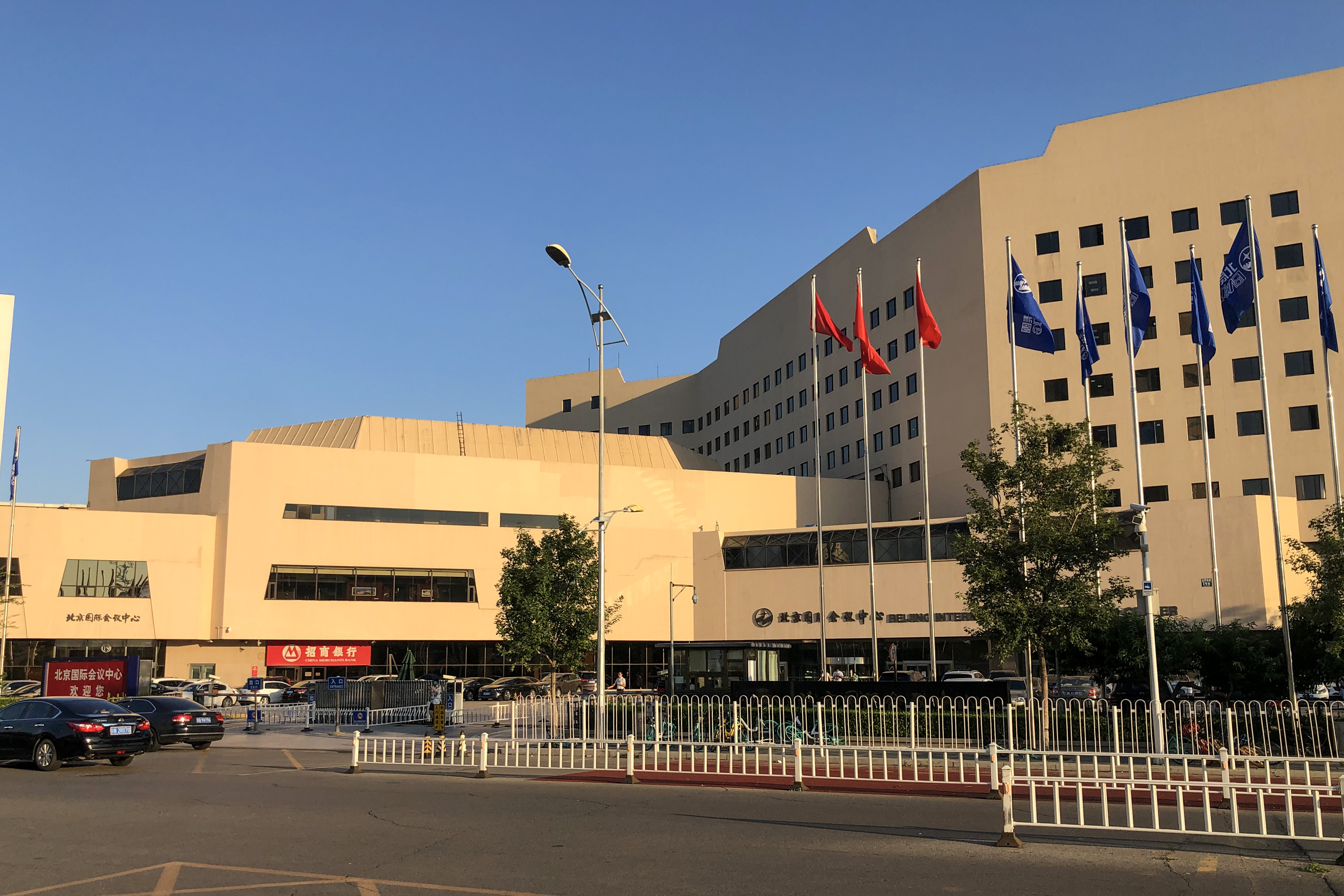
Beijing International Convention Center, where the conference was held

The conference was attended by representatives of 189 governments, UN agencies, intergovernmental organizations such as the European Union and League of Arab States, as well as activists and organizations from across the world. There were 17,000 participants, with a further 30,000 activists attending a parallel Forum.

Gertrude Mongella of Tanzania was the secretary-general of the conference.

Aung San Suu Kyi delivered the keynote address at the conference.

A full list of the statements made by attendees can be found on the UN website.

== Speeches ==
Hillary Rodham Clinton giving a speech during the conference.

Hillary Clinton, at the time the First Lady of the United States, gave the speech Women's Rights Are Human Rights at the conference on 5 September 1995. That speech is considered to be influential in the women's rights movement, and in 2013 Clinton led a review of how women's rights have changed since her 1995 speech.

"If there is one message that echoes forth from this conference, it is that human rights are women's rights.... And women's rights are human rights.

Let us not forget that among those rights are the right to speak freely. And the right to be heard.

Women must enjoy the right to participate fully in the social and political lives of their countries if we want freedom and democracy to thrive and endure."

--Hillary Rodham Clinton

Beverley Palesa Ditsie became the first African lesbian woman to address the United Nations about LGBT rights when she made her speech on 13 September 1995.

"No woman can determine the direction of her own life without the ability to determine her sexuality. Sexuality is an integral, deeply ingrained part of every human being's life and should not be subject to debate or coercion. Anyone who is truly committed to women's human rights must recognize that every woman has the right to determine her sexuality free of discrimination and oppression.

I urge you to make this a conference for all women, regardless of their sexual orientation, and to recognize in the Platform for Action that lesbian rights are women's rights and that women's rights are universal, inalienable, and indivisible human rights."

--Beverley Palesa Ditsie

Many other speeches were also given at the conference, on behalf of governments, the United Nations and inter-governmental organizations, and non-governmental organizations.

== The Beijing Platform for Action ==
The Beijing Declaration and Platform for Action is widely known as the most progressive blueprint for advancing women's rights.

The framework covers 12 areas of concern:

1. Women and the environment
2. Women in power and decision making
3. The girl child
4. Women and the economy
5. Women and poverty
6. Violence against women
7. Human rights of women
8. Education and training of women
9. Institutional mechanisms for the advancement of women
10. Women and health
11. Women and the media
12. Women and armed conflict

=== Beijing Declaration of Indigenous Women ===
A major result of the conference was the Beijing Declaration of Indigenous Women, signed at the NGO Forum in the Indigenous Women's Tent. This document seeks, in part, to reconcile the tension felt by Indigenous women activists and Indigenous movements dominated by men. It was a significant step forward towards Indigenous women's rights and a significant victory for Indigenous feminism practice.

The 50-point declaration provides the rationale and a clear call to action for governments navigating Indigenous issues across the globe. The demands in the document are "that all governments and international non-governmental and governmental organizations recognize the right of Indigenous peoples to self-determination, and enshrine the historical, political, social, cultural, economic, and religious rights of the Indigenous peoples in their constitutions and legal systems." From that premise, the declaration goes on to specify areas for action including self-determination; development, education and health; human rights violations and violence against Indigenous women; intellectual and cultural heritage; and political participation.

The document addresses the unique problems Indigenous women suffer in addition to those suffered by Indigenous men, which include erosion of culture (and gender roles therein), loss of traditional land, and compromised identity and status in the spaces they inhabit.

As its bases, the declaration cites the "UN Declaration of the International Decade of the World's Indigenous Peoples, the Draft Declaration of the Rights of the Indigenous peoples, the Convention on the Elimination of All Forms of Discrimination Against Women, the Nairobi Forward-Looking Strategies for the Advancement of Women, Agenda 21 and the Rio Declaration on Environment and Development, the Cairo Declaration on Human Rights in Islam, and the Copenhagen Social Summit Declaration."

== Global Focus: Women in Art and Culture ==
Global Focus: Women in Art and Culture was a project founded by artist and project director Nancy Cusick and gave women artists the opportunity to participate in the dialogue at the World Conference of Women. Women artists from around the world used their chosen media as a vehicle to produce work that evoked the universal issues paramount to women, their lives, and their position within the framework of society. Co-sponsored by the National Museum of Women in the Arts (NMWA), Global Focus presented an art exhibition, a video festival, slide presentations, performance pieces, and workshops that showed the artistic accomplishments and creativity of women. Most of the 880 artworks, produced by women artists from 27 countries, were displayed at the World Trade Center in Beijing, China. A smaller group of works were also exhibited in Huairou, China. These artworks formed a visual landscape of powerful images that immortalized the women's issues and themes which encompassed the conference—Equality, Development, and Peace.

Following the exhibition of the Global Focus artworks in Beijing, China, the corpus of works traveled to various international locations. Immediately after the close of the Beijing exhibit, a selection of 53 American paintings were displayed at the Elite Gallery in Moscow from October to November 1995. Subsequently, in November 1995, a selection of 200 works adorned the walls of the art gallery at the United States Department of Health and Human Services in Washington D.C. Simultaneously, another group of artworks from the collection were exhibited at the United States Information Agency also in Washington D.C. On 20 March 1996, the first public showing of the collection in the United States opened at NMWA in Washington D.C., with a day-long celebration revisiting and reflecting upon the experiences in Beijing. This exhibition, titled "Look at the World Through Women's Eyes", was on display through 21 April 1996. On 28 September 1996, the collection was exhibited at George Washington University in Washington D.C., during the National Women's Satellite Conference hosted by First Lady Hillary Rodham Clinton. From April to June 1997, a selection of 300 works from the collection were exhibited at the Peace Museum in Detroit. The last public display of the Global Focus exhibit was shown during the 20th Anniversary Celebration of the 1977 Spirit of Houston Conference in Washington D.C. After this final showing, the large group of artworks ended its journey, and the entire collection was presented by the project co-directors Nancy Cusick and Mal Johnson to the archives of the National Museum of Women in the Arts.

== Commemoration ==
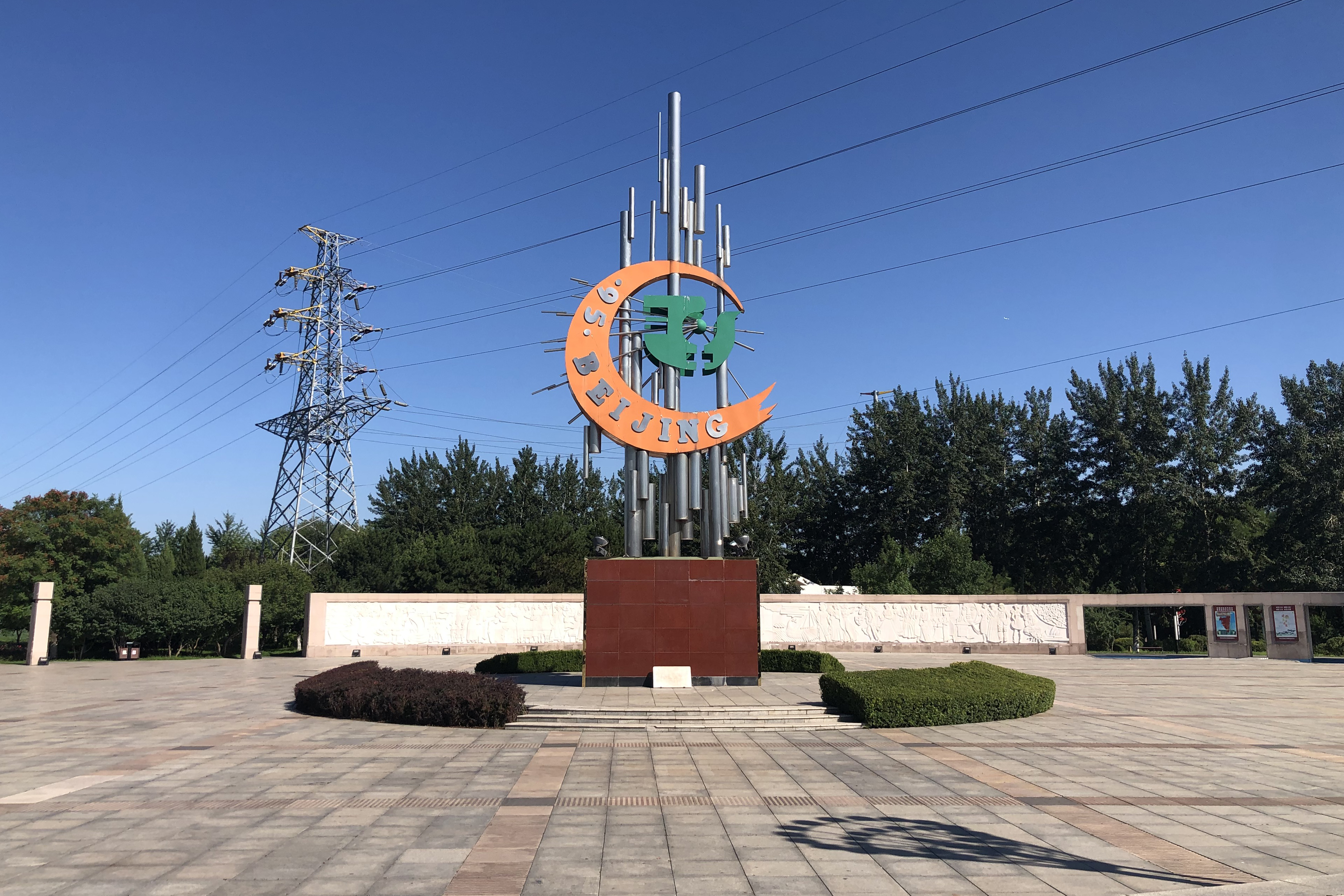
Fourth World Conference on Women Commemorative Park in Huairou District, Beijing

On 28 September 2004, the Fourth World Conference on Women Commemorative Park was officially opened in Huairou District, where the NGO forum was held.

In 2014 UN Women began its commemoration of the 20th anniversary of the Fourth World Conference on Women with the Empowering Women, Empowering Humanity: Picture It! campaign, also called the Beijing+20 campaign.

In 2019, UN Women launched the Generation Equality Campaign and Generation Equality Forum to "tackle the unfinished business of empowering women through a new groundbreaking, multi-generational campaign, Generation Equality: Realizing women's rights for an equal future." Also called Beijing +25, the campaign and forum are being organized in collaboration with members of civil society, and are meant to serve as the planning events, along with the 64th Session of the UN's Commission on the Status of Women (CSW), in the lead up to a UN General Assembly high-level meeting in New York on 23 September 2020. In 2019, at the 73rd session of the UN General Assembly, governments agreed to present their commitments and planned activities to bring about gender equality by 2030 at a one-day session during the 74th session in 2020. The demands of the Generation Equality Campaign include "equal pay, equal sharing of unpaid care and domestic work, an end to sexual harassment and all forms of violence against women and girls, health-care services that respond to their needs, and their equal participation in political life and decision-making in all areas of life." The Generation Equality Forum is being convened by UN Women, and co-chaired by Mexico and France. The Forum will begin in Mexico City, 7–8 May 2020 and will conclude in Paris, France from 7–10 July 2020. Discussions and reviews of progress on the Beijing Platform for Action and the Convention on the Elimination of All Forms of Discrimination Against Women (CEDAW) will also take place at the 64th session of the Commission on the Status of Women, in New York, on 9–20 March 2020.

On 1 October 2020, the High-Level Meeting on the 25th Anniversary of the Fourth World Conference on Women was held, where China proposed another Global Leaders' Meeting on Gender Equality and Women's Empowerment in 2025.

== Documentary ==
In 2015 a documentary called "MAKERS: Once And For All", about the Fourth World Conference on Women, premiered.

== See also ==
- Women's Peace Train
- Global Leaders' Meeting on Women
