= 2010 Virginia's 5th congressional district election =

- November 2, 2010
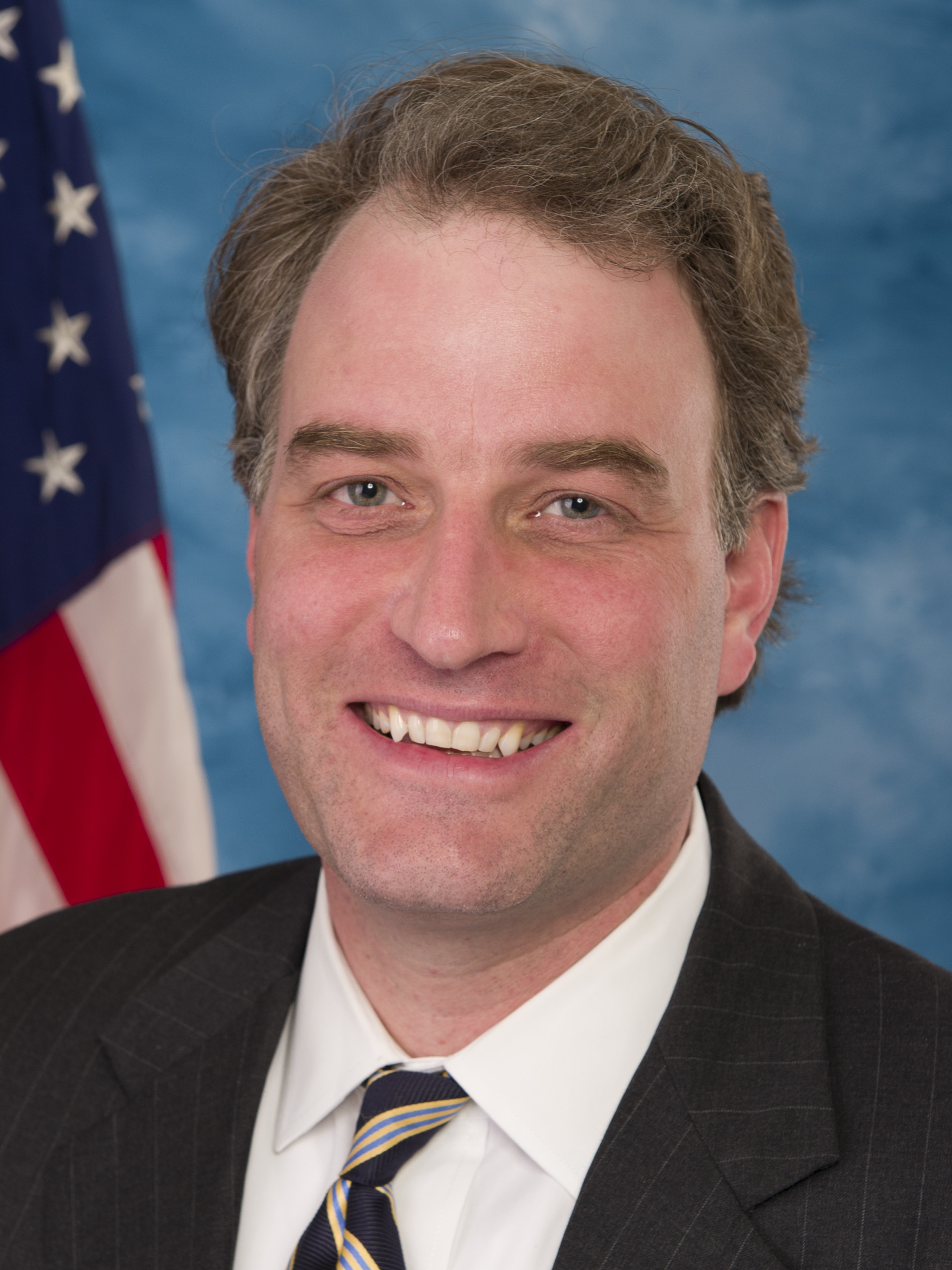

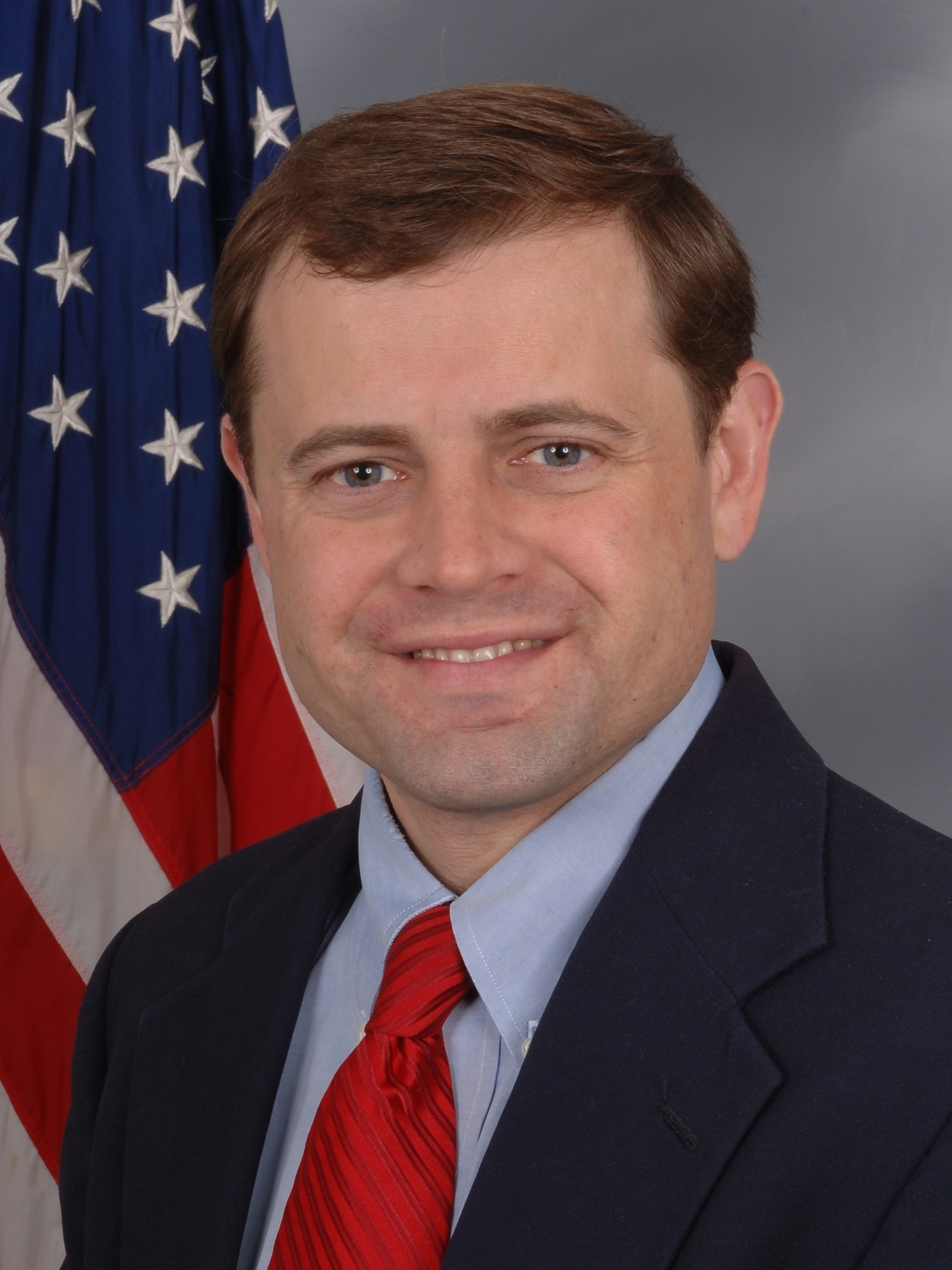
| Candidate | Robert Hurt | Tom Perriello |
| Party | Republican | Democratic |
| Popular vote | 119,560 | 110,562 |
| Percentage | 50.8% | 47.0% |
- County and independent city results Hurt: 40–50% 50–60% 60–70% Perriello: 50–60% 60–70% 70–80%
Representative before election
Tom Perriello
Democratic
Elected Representative
Robert Hurt
Republican

Virginia's 5th congressional district election, 2010 was an election held to determine who would represent Virginia's 5th congressional district in the United States House of Representatives during the 112th Congress. The candidates were incumbent Democrat Tom Perriello, Republican state Senator Robert Hurt and Independent candidate Jeffrey Clark. Hurt narrowly defeated Perriello in the general election, 51% to 47%, with Clark receiving 2% of the vote.

== Background ==
The seat being contested is located in Central and Southside Virginia. The district covers all or part of 18 counties and all of 4 independent cities, making it Virginia's largest district with an area of 8,922.03 square miles (23,108.0 km^{2}) - 193 sq mi (500 km^{2}). larger than New Jersey. The 5th district has been represented by Democratic representative Tom Perriello since the 2008 election result, when he defeated Republican incumbent Virgil Goode by 727 votes, one of the closest elections in the nation.

The 5th congressional district was traditionally a conservative Democratic district. Incumbent Virgil Goode left the party to become an independent in 2000, and then a Republican two years later. In his 2008 defeat of Goode, Perriello out-performed the Democratic national ticket in the district, which Republican presidential candidate John McCain carried by 51% to 48%. In the previous two presidential elections George Bush won by 56% and 55%.

Goode did not seek a rematch against Perriello, although he said several Conservative groups asked him to run on a pro-Tea Party ticket, due to their dissatisfaction with the Republicans. Assembly line worker Bradley Rees filed to run as a Republican, then stated he would run on the Virginia Conservative Party ticket, and then suspended his campaign in 2009.

=== Republican primary ===
Hurt won the Republican nomination a seven-way primary on June 8, 2010, with results:

- Robert Hurt, State Senator, 48.42%
- James K. "Jim" McKelvey, from Franklin County, 25.89%
- Michael G. McPadden, 9.78%
- Kenneth C. Boyd, Albemarle County Supervisor, 7.37%
- Feda Kidd Morton, educator and Republican activist, 4.59%
- Laurence Paul Verga, private real estate investor, 2.26%
- Ron L. Ferrin, businessman, 1.64%

== Candidates ==
- Tom Perriello, Democrat, incumbent U.S. Representative
- Robert Hurt, Republican, state Senator
- Jeffrey Clark, Independent

== Polling ==
| Poll source | Dates administered | Tom Perriello (D) | Robert Hurt (R) | Jeffrey Clark (I) | Undecided |
|---|---|---|---|---|---|
| Survey USA | October 28, 2010 | 45% | 50% | 4% | 3% |
| Survey USA | September 28, 2010 | 35% | 58% | 4% | 3% |
| Benenson Strategy Group | September 21, 2010 | 44% | 46% | 4% | 5% |
| Global Strategy Group | September 7, 2010 | 42% | 44% | 6% | 7% |
| Survey USA | September 2, 2010 | 35% | 61% | 2% | 2% |
| American Action Forum | August 12, 2010 | 43% | 49% | - | 8% |
| Survey USA | July 20, 2010 | 35% | 58% | 4% | 3% |
| Public Policy Polling | February 5–10, 2010 | 44% | 44% | | |

=== General election results ===
General Election Results
| Party | Candidate | Votes | % |
|---|---|---|---|
| Republican | Robert Hurt | 119,560 | 50.81 |
| Democratic | Tom Perriello (incumbent) | 110,562 | 46.98 |
| Independent | Jeffrey Clark | 4,992 | 2.12 |
| Total votes | | 235,360 | 100 |
