= Washington Printmakers Gallery =

American artist cooperative

Coordinates: 38°54′44.4″N 77°3′56.6″W

- Location: 1641 Wisconsin Avenue, NW, Washington, D.C. 20007
- Type: Artist cooperative
- Parking: Street parking
- Website: www.washingtonprintmakers.com

The Washington Printmakers Gallery is an artist cooperative focused on printmaking located in the Georgetown neighborhood of Washington, D.C.

== About ==
The Washington Printmakers Gallery originated with a group of artists meeting at Washington Women's Art Center. Dorothy Stratton King was a founder of the gallery. Originally located at 1832 Jefferson Place NW, the gallery's first show was in May 1985.

The gallery features prints created using traditional printmaking techniques such as lithography, woodcut, monotyping, linocut, and screen printing. In recent years the gallery has also included digital and photographic works.

The Washington Printmakers Gallery has moved physical locations multiple times. After two years on Jefferson Place, the gallery moved to 2106 1/2 R Street NW. In 1999 the gallery moved to a larger, above-ground space located at 1732 Connecticut Avenue, NW. In 2010, the gallery moved to the Pyramid Atlantic Art Center in Silver Spring, Maryland, and co-located with the art center until moving to the current location in 2014.

== National Small Works Exhibition ==
The National Small Works Exhibition, held annually since 1997, is a juried competition featuring works no larger than 100 square inches. Submissions are not limited to artists in the Washington area and the show attracts national talent. Past jurors include curators from the National Gallery of Art, Corcoran Gallery of Art, The Phillips Collection, and the Library of Congress.
