= Global Leaders' Meeting on Women =

2025 conference in Beijing

- Date: 13–14 October 2025
- Locations: China National Convention Center, Beijing
- Country: China

The Global Leaders' Meeting on Women was an international conference held in Beijing in October 2025 co-hosted by China and UN Women to commemorate the 30th anniversary of the World Conference on Women. Chinese leader Xi Jinping delivered a keynote address at the conference.

== Background ==
In 1995, China held the World Conference on Women in Beijing. On 7 March 2025, Chinese foreign minister Wang Yi announced that China would host the Global Summit of Women again in the second half of 2025. Before the event, Chinese publishers released two books of English translations of speeches and articles by Chinese leader Xi Jinping about women’s issues. The State Council Information Office also published a report titled China's Achievements in Women's Well-Rounded Development in the New Era, which said that continued success is dependent on "upholding the overall leadership of the Communist Party of China". Chinese state media also portrayed China as a global defender of women's rights; People’s Daily wrote that Chinese women had taken part in the Belt and Road initiative, while Xinhua News Agency said that in recent years, China had become a "leader, active advocate and firm activist in global women’s affairs". Chinese universities and official organizations also held seminars on women's rights.

Xinhua News Agency published interviews with participating foreign leaders praising China for its advancements in women's rights. Ing Kantha Phavi, the Cambodian minister for women’s affairs, said that the event would be a "milestone" and that she was "impressed with the progress China made in empowering women". She added "Chinese women ‘held up half the sky’, and their tenacity, creativity and leadership continue to impact the country’s development" and that "This not only brings a positive effect for Cambodia, but for the rest of the countries in the Global South as well". Gertrude Mongella, who was the first president of the Pan-African Parliament, said that China had contributed to improvements by providing help to other countries over the years. Dominican president Sylvanie Burton said "China has accumulated rich experience in many areas … including creating job opportunities for women, as well as helping women enter the global stage, participate in communication and work at all levels".

== The conference ==
On 13 October, Xi Jinping gave a speech, praising women's advancements in sports, technology and entrepreneurship. He said China had supported women to "hold up half the sky". Xi said "Chinese women in the new era are participating in the entire process of national and social governance with unprecedented confidence and vigor" and added "In China’s new journey of modernization, every woman is a protagonist". He called for gender equality to be "truly internalized" by society, calling for countries to "broaden channels for women to participate in political and decision-making, and promote women's broad participation in national and social governance". He said called on for "inclusive and harmonious social environment where women are free from discrimination and prejudice" and said the development of women still faced "complex challenges". He also announced China would donate US$10 million to UN Women over the next five years as well as US$100 million to the Global Development and South-South Cooperation Fund to promote women's rights. He said "China will support 1,000 small and beautiful livelihood projects for women and girls as the priority beneficiaries, and invite 50,000 women to China for exchange and training programmes". He said that 600 million women were in conflict zones, and called on countries to "firmly crack down on all sorts of violence against women". He gave several proposals on improving women's rights, including fostering a more peaceful environment for women, empowering women through technology and innovation, and eliminating gender bias. He mentioned China's "biggest battle against poverty in human history", which he said lifted 690 million Chinese women out of poverty, reduced maternal death rates by 80% since 1995, and led to women to make up around 40% of the national workforce. He also said "In the journey of Chinese modernisation, every woman plays a leading role".

On the same day, a plenary meeting of the Global Leaders' Meeting on Women was held. Afterwards, a chair's statement was issued by the host country China. On the afternoon of 14 October, the conference concluded with State Councilor and All-China Women's Federation President Shen Yiqin and United Nations Under-Secretary-General and United Nations Women Executive Director Sima Sami Bahous delivering speeches. According to the Chinese government, around 800 delegates from over 110 countries and international organizations attended the closing ceremony.
