= Dorothy Stratton King =

American painter and printmaker

- Born: Dorothy Stratton King; 1909; Worcester, Massachusetts, United States
- Died: June 14, 2007 (aged 97–98); Arlington Virginia, United States
- Known for: Intaglio (printmaking), painting
- Website: dorothystrattonking.com

Dorothy Stratton King (1909 in Worcester, Massachusetts- June 14, 2007, Arlington Virginia) was an American painter and printmaker. She was a founding member of the Washington Printmakers Gallery in Washington, DC. Her work is held by several public collections in the USA.

== Early life ==
Dorothy Stratton was born in Worcester and grew up in Sharon, Massachusetts. She began painting when very young.

She moved to Brooklyn, New York and studied figure drawing and painting at the Pratt Institute and took classes at the Brooklyn Museum School.

Dorothy Stratton married twice, first in 1928 to Michael Hicks-Beach and, after a divorce, William Asbury King in 1948.

In 1942 she had moved to Connecticut to live with her parents, where she helped her father deliver telegrams to families of soldiers killed in World War II.

== Later career ==
After her divorce in 1944 she moved to Los Angeles, California. She painted "Tom and Jerry" cartoon cells at Warner Brothers, then worked in Hollywood, designing costumes and film sets. It was here she met her second husband, who was the director of animation.

Dorothy King then moved to Paris where she studied painting at the Académie de la Grande Chaumière.

After returning to Los Angeles, her abstract expressionist paintings had success. She studied with artist Rico Lebrun at the University of California, Los Angeles, and then had her first major one-woman show at the Pasadena Museum of Art in 1959. She subsequently took classes in printmaking at the University of California at San Diego. In the 1970s, she worked as a conservator for the printmaker Beatrice Levy.

In the early 1980s Dorothy King moved to McLean, Virginia, where she helped found the Washington Printmakers Gallery in 1985. She became a founding member of the Columbia Pike Artist Studios in Arlington and a member of the Washington Print Club and the Artists Equity Association.

King's prints and paintings have been hung by the World Bank, at the Pushkin Museum of Fine Arts in Russia, Long Beach Museum of Art and several U.S. Embassies. Her work is held in the public collections of the Georgetown University Fine Print Collection, Corcoran Gallery of Art and the National Museum of Women in the Arts in Washington as well as many private collections.

King died on June 14, 2007, in Arlington, Virginia.
