= Ken Boyd (politician) =

American politician

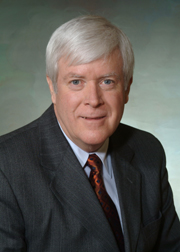
- Boyd in 2004

Member of the Albemarle County Board of Supervisors from the Rivanna District
- In office 2004–2011

Personal details
- Born: October 10, 1947 (age 78) Washington, D.C.
- Spouse: Brenda Boyd
- Children: 4
- Profession: Financial planner
- Website: Board of Supervisors website (archived)

Kenneth C. Boyd is an American politician. He is a member of the Albemarle County, Virginia Board of Supervisors. He ran unsuccessfully for the Republican Party nomination in Virginia's fifth congressional district to challenge incumbent Congressman Tom Perriello in the 2010 congressional elections. During the race, he stated that he did not anticipate running for a third term on the Board of Supervisors. Despite this, he won a third term following a hard fought campaign. He has been noted for his strong support of developers and sprawling developments on the Board. He represents the Rivanna Magisterial District. His current term ends in 2015.

== Early life ==
Boyd was born in Washington, D.C. and graduated from Woodrow Wilson High School. Soon afterwards, he moved to Burlington, North Carolina with his family. In 1968, he was a volunteer for Democrat Robert W. Scott's campaign for Governor of North Carolina.

He moved to Albemarle County in 1982 to take a job working for Jefferson National Bank. He left the bank to start a financial planning business in 1991. He completed his undergraduate degree many years later from Averett University, followed soon by an MBA. Boyd's political career began in 1993 when he volunteered for the gubernatorial campaign of Republican George Allen. In 1999, he successfully ran for the Rivanna district seat on the Albemarle County School Board.

== School Board ==
In 1999, Boyd ran unopposed for the Rivanna district seat on the Albemarle County School Board. Four years later, he opted to run for Board of Supervisors.

== Board of Supervisors ==
In 2003, Boyd successfully ran for a seat on the Board of Supervisors, defeating Democrat Peter Hallock. He was the chairperson from 2007 to 2008. Four years later, he ran for reelection and beat Marcia Joseph by a 146 vote margin. In 2009, he told C-Ville Weekly he would not run for reelection to his Supervisor seat in 2011.

Boyd originally sought the chairmanship of the Board in 2009, but withdrew his name from consideration in the face of opposition. Democrat Ann Mallek went on to win her second year as chair of the Board. Despite failing to become chair, Boyd has been described as the Board's "de facto majority leader" in the press.

=== Western bypass rebirth ===
Boyd played a central role during the June 8th, 2011 surprise vote to change Albemarle County's position on the western bypass. The project was listed as one of the most wasteful road projects in the country by Taxpayers for Common Sense and is unpopular with the public. The move was condemned in an unprecedented editorial in The Daily Progress, Charlottesville's conservative daily, stating that the actions were "disrespectful toward constituents and disdainful of best practices in public decision-making." The editorial went on to state that Boyd's actions were "appalling", an "end run around the public," whether "the bypass is the best solution for the public or not, the manner in which this step was taken is contemptuous in the extreme" and amounted to an "act of contempt for the public" as well as for "best practices of public leadership."

=== 2011 campaign ===
Despite saying he did not anticipate a third run for Board during his congressional run, Boyd announced his intention to campaign for a third term on the board of supervisors in May 2011. His opponent was retired IBM vice president of Human Resources Cynthia Neff. He coasted to reelection in a campaign that revolved around his role in the Western Bypass rebirth.

== Congressional run ==
In 2009, Boyd ran for the Republican Party nomination to challenge Democrat Tom Perriello in the upcoming election. Boyd struggled with garnering support from within the Tea Party, receiving poor ratings from local Tea Party organizations amid a crowded field. He attracted attention for his assertion that the Department of Education should be abolished, adding that the Federal Government should stay out of education. During his campaign, he received support from local colleagues from Albemarle County. Ultimately, although winning Albemarle, he came in fourth place overall, as he was defeated by then State Senator Robert Hurt.
