= Nancy Cusick =

American painter (1924–2010)

- Born: Nancy Taylor; January 17, 1924; Washington, D.C.
- Died: April 1, 2010 (aged 86)
- Other name: Nancy Cusick Fox

Nancy Cusick (1924–2010) was an American collagist, painter, photographer and writer known for her role in the feminist art movement and her global efforts to represent women artists.

== Early life and education ==
Cusick nee Taylor was born on January 17, 1924 in Washington, D.C. She attended Georgetown University and American University. She was married twice, first to Alan P. Cusick then to Thomas D. Fox. Nancy Cusick's artistic journey began with an early interest in art and abstract theory. In 1961, she completed her thesis titled Dynamic Composition in Organic Abstraction at American University. In this work, Cusick explored the concepts of composition and abstraction within organic forms, laying the groundwork for her later contributions to feminist art theory.

== Artistic career and feminist art movement ==
Cusick was involved with the Washington Women's Art Center (WWAC) serving as director in 1979. While there she worked on organizing American participation in the 1980 International Festival of Women Artists in Copenhagen. Through her involvement, Cusick helped organize feminist exhibitions and provided a platform for women artists who were often marginalized in mainstream art spaces. She organized portions of Focus International held in Nairobi as part of the World Conference on Women, 1985. Cusick was a regular contributor to Women Artists News.

== The Global Focus Project ==
One of Cusick’s most significant contributions was the Global Focus project, which she spearheaded as part of her involvement with the United Nations fourth World Conference on Women, 1995.

She died on April 1, 2010. A selection of her papers are in the National Museum of Women in the Arts Library and Research Center as well as the DC Public Library

== Influence and legacy ==
Cusick’s work is often discussed within the broader context of feminist art history. She was featured in The Power of Feminist Art: The American Movement of the 1970s, History and Impact by Broude and Garrard, a comprehensive analysis of the feminist art movement in the United States.
