= Women's rights are human rights =

Phrase used in the feminist movement

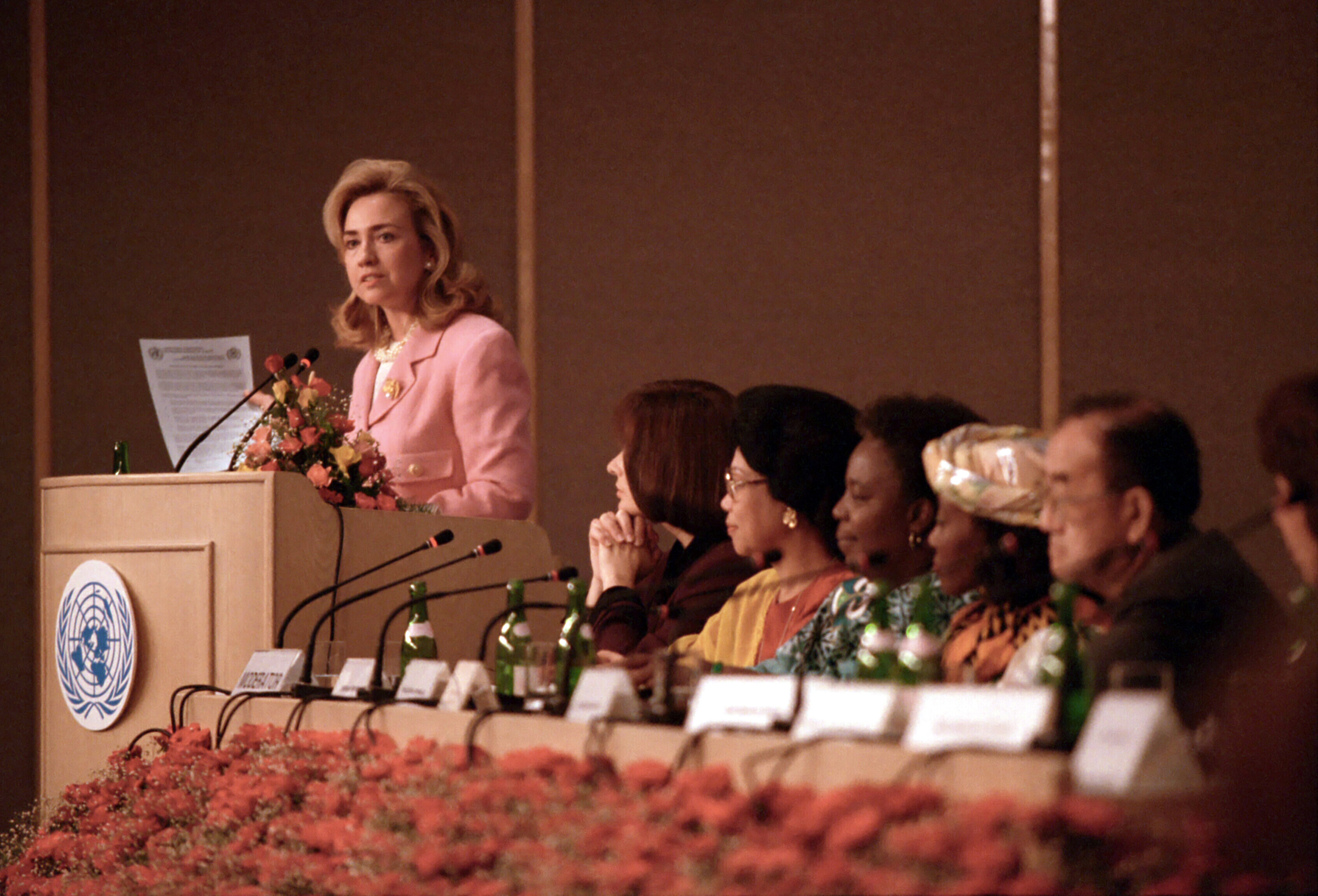
First Lady of the United States Hillary Rodham Clinton during her speech in Beijing, China.

"Women's rights are human rights" is a phrase used in the feminist movement. The phrase was first used in the 1980s and early 1990s. Its most prominent usage is as the name of a speech given by Hillary Rodham Clinton, the First Lady of the United States, on September 5, 1995, at the United Nations Fourth World Conference on Women in Beijing. In this speech, she sought to closely link the notion of women's rights with that of human rights. In the speech, Clinton used the phrase within the longer, bidirectional refrain, "human rights are women's rights and women's rights are human rights."

== First uses ==
The idea, if not in those specific words, that "women's rights are human rights" was first expressed with different phrasing by the abolitionists and proto-feminists Sarah Moore Grimké and Angelina Grimké Weld in the late 1830s. In her series of Letters on the Equality of the Sexes, Sarah Moore Grimké writes, "Consequently I know nothing of man's rights, or woman's rights; human rights are all that I recognize". A similar expression is used by her sister, Angelina Grimké Weld, in her speeches and personal letters. In a letter to her friend Jane Smith, she writes, "whatever is morally right for a man to do is morally right for a woman to do. I recognized no rights but human rights."

The phrase "Women's rights are human rights" was used intermittently during the 1980s and first half of the 1990s, before Clinton's speech. Instances include in 1984, when The New York Times quoted the head of New York City's Human Rights Commission, Marcella Maxwell, using this phrase in conversation. It was again used in 1985 by Cecilia Medina, a noted Chilean jurist, in a seminal paper on feminism. The title of her work was 'Women's Rights as Human Rights: Latin American Countries and the Organization of American States (OAS).' In articulating the historic idea, Medina wrote, "As a logical consequence of the fact that women's rights are human rights, feminism, in theory, is a movement to achieve a democratic society, without which human rights may not be fully enjoyed."

Canadian politician Ed Broadbent, who was the head of the International Centre for Human Rights and Democratic Development, used the phrase in an interview with the Calgary Herald in January 1993 when he stated, "If we believe as a society that women's rights are human rights, then it is time to stop discriminating against women in refugee policy." The phrase was used by Laurel Fletcher during a 1993 international law symposium called Human Rights Violations Against Women, an edited version of which was published by Fletcher, Allyn Taylor and Joan Fitzpatrick in 1994. Article 3 of Malaysian Charter on Human Rights, published in December 1994 by a number of non-governmental organizations, begins with the sentence "Women's Rights are Human Rights."

== Clinton's speech ==
Audio file of Clinton declaring, "If there is one message that echoes forth from this conference, let it be that human rights are women's rights and women's rights are human rights, once and for all."

Footage of Clinton's speech in its entirety. At approximately the 14:45 mark, Clinton utters the famous line, "Women's rights are human rights"

In planning to make her speech, the 47-year-old Clinton defied both internal administration pressure and external Chinese pressure to soften her remarks. The U.S. State Department and the National Security Agency both tried to dissuade her on the grounds that it would irritate the Chinese. While President Bill Clinton had seen the speech in advance, his aides had not, and White House Chief of Staff Thomas McLarty was under the impression that it would not say anything new or controversial. Some human rights campaigners also objected to Clinton speaking in China, fearing it would legitimize that government, and a State Department condition was that Chinese human rights activist Harry Wu be released before she would appear, which he was. Some vocal Catholic groups criticized the gathering as "anti-family" while some ideological conservatives said that Clinton was clearly going to push a "radical feminist agenda" while there.

Once it happened on September 5, 1995, Clinton's speech was delivered in a large hall at the conference. In it, she argued against practices abusing women around the world and in China itself. Targeting governments and organizations as well as individual females, she stated her belief that the issues facing women and girls are often either ignored or "silenced" and thus go unresolved. Elements brought up in the speech include dowry deaths and China's one-child policy.

Hillary Clinton declared "that it is no longer acceptable to discuss women's rights as separate from human rights". Delegates from over 180 countries heard her say:

"If there is one message that echoes forth from this conference, let it be that human rights are women's rights and women's rights are human rights, once and for all."

She followed this by saying, "As long as discrimination and inequities remain so commonplace everywhere in the world, as long as girls and women are valued less, fed less, fed last, overworked, underpaid, not schooled, subjected to violence in and outside their homes—the potential of the human family to create a peaceful, prosperous world will not be realized." A number of the women delegates at the conference pounded on tables and cheered as she spoke.

China's citizenry was not allowed to attend the speech, and it was blacked out on Chinese radio and television.

The speech received prominent media attention at the time. NBC News anchor Tom Brokaw said, "In her own way, she made a direct hit on the Chinese," while that network's correspondent Andrea Mitchell said it was "highly unusual" for a U.S. first lady to engage in this kind of significant diplomatic activity. The New York Times said that Clinton spoke "more forcefully on human rights than any American dignitary has on Chinese soil."

== Legacy ==
The speech is considered to be influential in the women's rights movement. Specifically, it became a key moment in the empowerment of women, and years later women around the world would recite Clinton's key phrases.

In 2011, Clinton took a similar position on LGBT rights in a speech to the United Nations on International Human Rights Day, declaring "gay rights are human rights, and human rights are gay rights."

In 2013, following Clinton's time as U.S. Secretary of State, Clinton led a review at the Clinton Global Initiative of how women's rights have changed since her 1995 speech. It concluded that progress had been made for girls in education and for women and girls in healthcare but that females around the world still suffered due to lack of political rights and security vulnerabilities. In Clinton's words: "It's a glass-half-filled kind of scenario."

On the twentieth anniversary of the speech in 2015, there were more retrospectives on it. Not everyone was enamored with it: publicly visible lawyer Bruce Fein said: "She made one statement in Beijing that wasn't very profound — that women are human beings."

The speech and phrase became a focal point of Clinton's 2016 presidential campaign. The campaign sold T-shirts stating "women's rights are human rights" at her campaign store, in reference to her speech. The campaign also sold a bag that featured the full phrase "Human rights are women's rights and women's rights are human rights"; on the bag it was shown in six languages. As well, the campaign sold a Tory Burch T-shirt featuring the phrase "women's rights are human rights..." in capital letters. The campaign also created photo references and displays of items necessary for five Halloween costumes, including "'Women's rights are human rights' Hillary".

In Jennifer Lopez's 2016 music video for her song "Ain't Your Mama", a sample of Clinton giving part of her speech can be heard, specifically, "Human rights are women's rights, and women's rights are human rights, once and for all."

In 2017, for International Women's Day, Madonna released a short film titled Her-Story; it ends with the message "Women's rights are human rights."

As evidenced by physician Leslie Regan in The Journal of Sexual Medicine, the phrase remains relevant in political discourse in the 2010s, specifically with regards to the discussion of policy regarding women's sexual health and reproductive rights.
