= Tom Perriello =

American attorney, diplomat, and politician (born 1974)

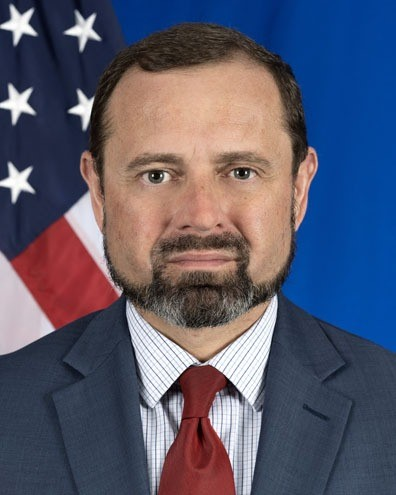
- Official portrait, 2024

United States Special Envoy for Sudan
- In office February 26, 2024 – January 18, 2025
- President: Joe Biden
- Preceded by: Position established
- Succeeded by: Position abolished

United States Special Envoy for the African Great Lakes
- In office July 6, 2015 – December 23, 2016
- President: Barack Obama
- Preceded by: Russ Feingold
- Succeeded by: J. Peter Pham

Special Representative for the Quadrennial Diplomacy and Development Review
- In office February 24, 2014 – July 5, 2015
- President: Barack Obama
- Preceded by: David McKean
- Succeeded by: Laurence D. Wohlers

Member of the U.S. House of Representatives from Virginia's 5th district
- In office January 3, 2009 – January 3, 2011
- Preceded by: Virgil Goode
- Succeeded by: Robert Hurt

Personal details
- Born: Thomas Stuart Price Perriello; October 9, 1974 (age 52) Charlottesville, Virginia, U.S.
- Party: Democratic
- Education: Yale University (BA, JD)

Thomas Stuart Price Perriello (born October 9, 1974) is an American attorney, diplomat, and politician. He previously served in numerous positions at the United States State Department, including special representative for the Quadrennial Diplomacy and Development Review, special envoy for the African Great Lakes, and special envoy for Sudan. A Democrat, Perriello served as the U.S. representative for Virginia's 5th congressional district from 2009 to 2011.

Perriello ran for Virginia's 5th congressional district in 2008. He narrowly defeated six-term Republican incumbent Virgil H. Goode Jr. by 727 votes out of over 317,000 cast. At the time he served, the district included much of Southside Virginia and stretched north to Charlottesville. Perriello was defeated in the 2010 election by Republican state senator Robert Hurt.

In February 2014, he was appointed special representative for the Quadrennial Diplomacy and Development Review, serving until July 2015. From July 2015 to December 2016, he was special envoy for the Great Lakes Region of Africa and the Democratic Republic of Congo, succeeding former U.S. senator Russ Feingold. Perriello ran for the Democratic nomination in the 2017 Virginia gubernatorial election, but lost to Ralph Northam.

For over four years until July 2023, Perriello served as the executive director for U.S. Programs at the Open Society Foundations. On February 26, 2024, Perriello was appointed special envoy for Sudan. He resigned on January 18, 2025, shortly before the second inauguration of Donald Trump.

He was the Democratic nominee for Virginia's 5th congressional district in the 2026 election, and was narrowly defeated by the incumbent Republican Representative, John McGuire.

== Early life and education ==
Thomas Stuart Price Perriello was born on October 9, 1974, in Charlottesville, Virginia, and grew up in Ivy, a small, affluent, unincorporated community west of Charlottesville. He is the son of Linda (née Gillooly), a financial analyst, and Vito Anthony Perriello Jr., a pediatrician. His paternal grandparents were Italian immigrants, and his mother is from an evangelical Christian family from Ohio. He attended Murray Elementary School, Meriwether Lewis Elementary School, Henley Middle School and Western Albemarle High School in the county school system, and then graduated from St. Anne's-Belfield School, a private school. He attained the rank of Eagle Scout in Boy Scout Troop 114 in Ivy, and was a legislative page in the Virginia House of Delegates.

He received his B.A. (1996) and J.D. (2001) from Yale University.

== Early career ==
From 2002–2003, Perriello worked for the UN-mandated Special Court for Sierra Leone, where he eventually became special adviser to the prosecutor, David Crane. He has worked as a consultant to the International Center for Transitional Justice in Kosovo (2003), Darfur (2005), and Afghanistan (2007) where he worked on justice-based security strategies. Perriello has also been a fellow at The Century Foundation and consultant to the National Council of Churches of Christ.

== U.S. House of Representatives ==
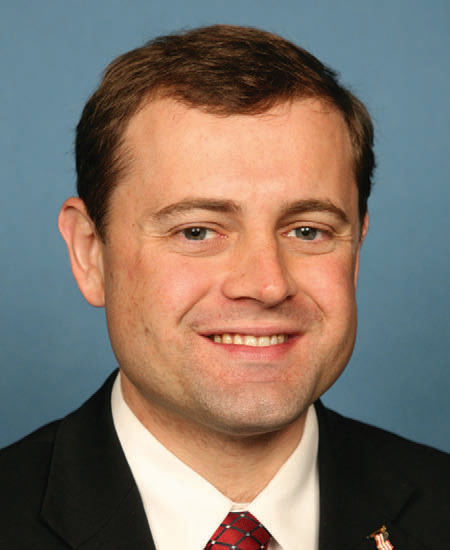
Perriello during the 111th Congress

=== Elections ===
==== 2008 ====
Perriello won a narrow (50.1% to 49.9%) victory over Republican six-term incumbent Virgil H. Goode Jr., a longtime figure in Virginia politics who had previously represented a large portion of the district in the Senate of Virginia. Perriello had trailed Goode in the polls by 30 percent only three months before the election. Politico reported that Goode's campaign was impaired by remarks by Goode that were interpreted as anti-Muslim and by a flap over Goode's tenuous connection to a gay-themed movie.

The traditionally Democratic urban areas of the district gave Perriello significant margins over Goode. While Goode won 13 of the 20 county-level jurisdictions in the district, Perriello won all but one independent city, Bedford, which went for Goode by only 16 votes. Ultimately, Perriello prevailed largely on the strength of a more than 25,000 vote margin in Charlottesville and surrounding Albemarle County. Perriello's performance showed the most dramatic improvements over past Democratic voting in the more conservative areas of the district hardest hit by decades of job loss and economic slowdown. As a presidential candidate, Barack Obama also improved on past Democratic performance, but he ultimately lost this district by around 7,500 votes (2.5 percentage points). For example, Perriello significantly outperformed Obama in the district's strongly conservative southwestern portion. Ironically, this was Goode's base; he had represented much of the district's southern portion for 35 years at the state and federal level. Perriello may also have been helped by coattails from atop the ticket, as Mark Warner won the district in a landslide with 65 percent of the vote.

==== 2010 ====
In the 2010 race, Perriello lost his bid for reelection to Republican Robert Hurt receiving 47.0% of the vote to Hurt's 50.8%; independent Jeffrey A. Clark received 2.1%.

Perriello's narrow victory by just 727 ballots in 2008 had attracted early targeting from both sides so that by 2010 it was a closely watched contest with national parties and outside groups active on both sides. Outside groups and party committees together spent around $5.1 million on the race; groups supporting the Perriello campaign accounted for about $3 million of that spending. More than $1.5 million was invested in TV spots supporting Perriello, wihile nearly $370,000 from the NRCC went to TV ads targeting him.

Perriello's campaign defended much of his congressional record. His platform was in support of job creation, the 2009 stimulus, the Affordable Care Act, and renewable-energy and rural energy-efficiency initiatives to rebuild American manufacturing. He identified as a populist, and was outspoken about the economic approach of the White House, criticizing the economic team and advisor Lawrence Summers of being too close to Wall Street and not investing in the country's infrastructure. His endorsements included the NRA Political Victory Fund, Veterans of Foreign Wars, and the National Committee to Preserve Social Security and Medicare."

In the final stretch Periello launched a non-stop campaign blitz on October 25, 2010, known as "24 Hours of Tom." The marathon was designed to mirror the double shifts worked by his constituents, starting with a midnight study session with college students at Ferrum College in Franklin County. He met with truck drivers, emergency responders, steelworkers, and more, then to Charlottesville for a debate at the University of Virginia with Jeff Clark, the independent candidate, before returning home. Obama campaigned with him in Charlottesville on October 29. On election day, Perriello lost by 3.8%, which was considered a surprisingly close result in the Republican-leaning district.

=== Tenure ===
In announcing his first bid for Congress in 2007, Perriello spoke of his conviction politics: "Conviction politics will make me more effective if I win. The first question I asked myself before deciding to run for office was not 'can I win?' but 'can I improve people's lives if I win?'"

Citing the 2006 midterm elections, Perriello pointed toward the example of fellow Democrats including Senators Jim Webb, Sherrod Brown, and Jon Tester—all winning in difficult political environments with firm positions that cut across typical progressive or conservative ideologies. Perriello framed his positions as "for the people and not for the corporate establishment" and did not focus on partisan divisions.

During his time in Congress, Perriello often explained his support for controversial votes by his standard of conviction politics. Perriello described his vote for Cap and Trade legislation as a national security imperative, stating "There's got to be something more important than getting reelected," in an interview with Politico. "If I lose my seat, and that's the worst that happens, I could live with that."

Time termed Perriello an "unapologetic progressive" in naming him one of the "new civic leaders" in its 40 under 40 issue for 2010.

=== Committee assignments ===
- Committee on Transportation and Infrastructure
  - Subcommittee on Economic Development, Public Buildings and Emergency Management
  - Subcommittee on Water Resources and Environment
  - Subcommittee on Railroads, Pipelines, and Hazardous Materials
- Committee on Veterans' Affairs
  - Subcommittee on Economic Opportunity
  - Subcommittee on Health

== Political positions ==
While in Congress, Perriello supported landmark legislation, including the Affordable Care Act, DREAM Act, and climate and stimulus legislation. A populist Democrat, he was an ally in Congress of President Barack Obama, although he did not always vote in support of the President's agenda. Perriello voted with the Democratic majority in the House of Representatives 90% of the time, according to a Washington Post analysis.

Perriello voted for the American Recovery and Reinvestment Act, the American Clean Energy and Security Act, and the Patient Protection and Affordable Care Act in March 2010.

=== Economic policy ===
Perriello voted against the Unemployment Compensation Extension Act of 2009, because the bill extended unemployment benefits for only some states and excluded Virginia. He pressed the administration and Congress to include more infrastructure spending in the stimulus bill, and authored the Every Penny to Main Street Act, which would have used the money that banks paid back from the bailout to directly create new jobs in construction. He also repeatedly urged Democrats to introduce a comprehensive national jobs bill.

=== Energy ===
Perriello has been vocal in his support of sustainable energy solutions and energy independence. In April 2018, Perriello co-authored an opinion piece in the Washington Post with Tom Cormons, executive director of Appalachian Voices, calling on Governor Northam to support a push by landowners and environmental groups against a fracking gas pipeline through the Blue Ridge Mountains.

=== Gun control ===
Perriello opposed a ban on assault weapons while in Congress.

=== Healthcare ===
During debate over the health care bill in the House, he voted for the Stupak–Pitts Amendment to the Affordable Health Care for America Act, which would have prohibited the use of federal funds to cover any part of the costs of any health plan that includes coverage of abortion, except in cases of rape, incest or danger to the life of the mother. But Perriello later supported the final Senate version of the bill (the Patient Protection and Affordable Care Act), which did not include the Stupak-Pitts language, and has since said he regrets his vote for Stupak, calling it the "worst vote of his career."

=== Hate speech and discrimination ===
Perriello strongly condemned the Unite the Right rally that occurred in Charlottesville in August 2017. Perriello wrote in Slate magazine that, “Our future will be determined by whether we speak honestly about the racial demagoguery of this White House, whether principled conservatives stop enabling the racist and authoritarian policies of the Trump administration, whether we restore the line between force and violence, and whether we have the moral and intellectual courage to engage honestly with our past.” On the one year anniversary of the rally in 2018, Perriello said that while the impact of the rally remains to be seen, the event “could prove to be a wake-up call that inspired a more inclusive and just community and country.” He also strongly emphasized a need for white Americans to actively speak out and demonstrate against racism, in order to counter the narrative of white supremacists.

=== National security ===
Perriello called for "keeping America safe by working to ensure that our military is equipped with the resources, equipment, and training necessary to win the global war on terrorism." Although he cast votes for the continuation of U.S. military action in Afghanistan, he also cosponsored legislation requiring U.S. President Barack Obama to submit an exit strategy for the end of combat operations in Afghanistan. Perriello also opposed removing the U.S. military from Pakistan. In 2010, Perriello voted in support of the defense bill.

== Post-congressional career ==
=== Center for American Progress ===
After losing his congressional seat, Perriello served as president and CEO of the Center for American Progress Action Fund and as a counselor for policy at Center for American Progress where he spoke out on issues of immigration reform, voting rights, inequality, and campaign finance reform.

=== U.S. Department of State ===
Secretary of State John Kerry tapped Perriello to lead the 2015 Quadrennial Diplomacy & Development Review, a strategic planning process intended to be conducted every four years for the U.S. Department of State and the U.S. Agency for International Development (USAID). The two agencies have a budget of more than $50 billion and 80,000 employees. The resulting document, Enduring Leadership in a Dynamic World, set out four strategic priorities for American diplomacy and foreign assistance: preventing conflict and violent extremism, promoting democratic societies, advancing inclusive economic growth, and mitigating climate change. It also identified ways to make the agencies more efficient, including improving the use of data and diagnostics.

In 2015, President Obama appointed Perriello to succeed former U.S. Senator Russell Feingold (D-Wisc.) as Special Envoy to the Great Lakes Region and the Democratic Republic of Congo. As Special Envoy, Perriello was the U.S. representative to a region including Democratic Republic of Congo, Burundi, and Rwanda, countries working to overcome a recent legacy of civil war and genocide. Perriello was charged with implementing the administration's policies of preventing mass atrocities and supporting the emergence of peaceful, democratic societies.

In the Democratic Republic of Congo, Perriello worked closely with the national council of Catholic bishops to support mediation between the president and opposition groups over a political crisis triggered when the president attempted to stay in office beyond his constitutional term. This work culminated in the historic New Year's Eve agreement on December 31, 2016, which lays out a path to the first peaceful transition of power since the country's independence in 1960. He later wrote about the political challenges facing Congo in the Washington Post.

=== 2017 gubernatorial campaign ===
On January 5, 2017, Perriello announced that he would run for Governor of Virginia in the 2017 election on a platform centered around economic justice as well as resistance to the Trump Administration. In his campaign, he championed robust policies for addressing the racial wealth gap, reproductive health, resurgent monopolies, and corruption.

A group of more than 30 former Obama staffers signed a letter endorsing Perriello for governor, including Obama's 2008 campaign manager David Plouffe and former White House Senior Adviser Dan Pfeiffer. They were joined by Senator and former presidential candidate Bernie Sanders, who subsequently appeared with Perriello at a George Mason University rally. Other individuals and organizations who endorsed Perriello, included Our Revolution, a Sanders' affiliated group; Khizr and Ghazala Khan; the Progressive Change Campaign Committee; Sen. Elizabeth Warren (D-Mass.); John Podesta, the chairman of Hillary Clinton's 2016 presidential campaign; and Center for American Progress and Center for American Progress Action Fund President and CEO Neera Tanden.

Perriello ran for the Democratic nomination against Virginia's lieutenant governor, pediatric neurologist and former state senator Ralph Northam, who prior to Perriello's entrance into the race had been endorsed by Virginia Senators Mark Warner and Tim Kaine; Virginia Governor Terry McAuliffe; Virginia Representatives Robert C. "Bobby" Scott, Don Beyer, and A. Donald McEachin; Virginia Attorney General Mark Herring; and the full membership of the Virginia Democratic House and Senate Caucuses.

Throughout the race, Perriello faced criticism from NARAL (which endorsed Northam) because of Perriello's 2009 vote in favor of prohibiting federal funding for abortion coverage in insurance plans subsidized under the Affordable Health Care for America Act—a vote which Perriello has claimed was an attempt to keep a promise to constituents in his conservative, mostly rural district. Perriello has since apologized repeatedly for the vote, calling it a "bad vote and a bad pledge," while promising that he sees abortion as a "fundamental right" that should be accessible to all women.

Perriello criticized Northam for having twice voted for George W. Bush—votes that Northam said occurred at a time when he was largely apolitical, prior to his first run for office.

Perriello refused to accept campaign contributions from Dominion Energy, a state-regulated utility and Virginia's biggest political donor. Northam accepted over $100,000 in donations from the company and its executives.

On June 13, 2017, Northam defeated Perriello in the primary. Perriello then immediately congratulated Northam on his victory on Twitter. In an interview with the New Yorker, Perriello said that his single biggest takeaway from the campaign was “whichever party ends up figuring out how to speak about two economic issues—automation and monopoly—will not only be doing right by the country but will have a massive electoral advantage.”

After the primary, Perriello became CEO of Win Virginia, a PAC dedicated to helping Democrats win back the Virginia House of Delegates in 2017. The Republican Party held a 66–34 majority in the House of Delegates before the 2017 Virginia House of Delegates election but lost 15 seats to the Democratic Party, resulting in the Republicans only holding a 50–49 advantage.

=== Open Society Foundations ===
Open Society announced on October 10, 2018, that Perriello would become executive director of the Foundations' U.S. Programs starting November 12, 2018.

=== 2026 U.S. House campaign ===
On December 9, 2025, Perriello announced his bid to represent Virginia's 5th congressional district–the seat he had previously held from 2009 to 2011–in advance of the 2026 midterm elections. Perriello won the Democratic primary on August 4, 2026, making him the official nominee for the general election against incumbent Republican, John McGuire. On November 3, 2026, Perriello was narrowly defeated as McGuire was elected to another term.

U.S. House of Representatives
Preceded by Virgil Goode	Member of the U.S. House of Representatives from Virginia's 5th congressional district 2009–2011	Succeeded by Robert Hurt
Diplomatic posts
Preceded by David McKean	Special Representative for the Quadrennial Diplomacy and Development Review; 2014–2015	Vacant
Preceded by Russ Feingold	United States Special Envoy for the African Great Lakes and the Congo-Kinshasa; 2015–2016	Vacant
U.S. order of precedence (ceremonial)
Preceded by Glenn Nye as Former U.S. Representative	Order of precedence of the United States as Former U.S. Representative	Succeeded by Tom Garrett as Former U.S. Representative
