= Quadrennial Diplomacy and Development Review =

US master plan for non-military foreign policy

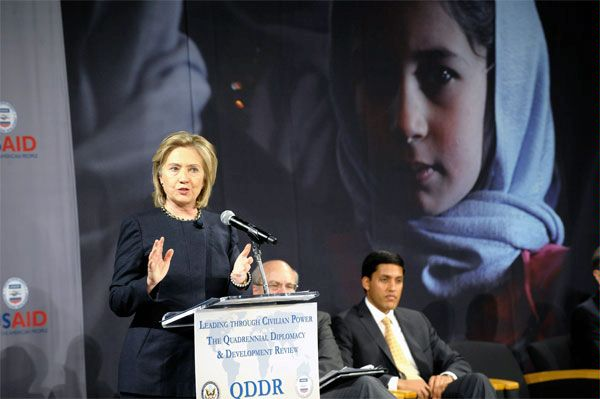
Secretary of State Hillary Clinton and USAID Administrator Rajiv Shah present the first QDDR, December 2010

The Quadrennial Diplomacy and Development Review (QDDR) is a study by the United States Department of State, conducted beginning in 2009 and intended to be done every four years, that analyzes the short-, medium-, and long-term blueprint for the United States' diplomatic and development efforts abroad. It seeks to plan on a longer-term basis than the usual year-to-year, appropriations-based practice, and to integrate diplomacy and development missions. It similarly seeks to correlate the department’s missions with its capacities and identify shortfalls in resourcing. Finally, it is a precursor to core institutional reforms and corrective changes. The first review was completed by the end of 2010. A second review began during 2014 and was released in April 2015. No further reviews have taken place.

== Objectives ==
The final report of the QDDR lays out, in the department's own words:

- The baseline: An assessment of (1) the range of global threats, challenges and opportunities both today and over the next two decades that should inform our diplomatic and development strategies; and (2) the current status of our approaches to diplomacy and development, with emphasis on the relationship between diplomacy and development in our existing policies and structures.
- The ends: A clear statement of our overarching foreign policy and development objectives, our specific policy priorities, and our expected results, with an emphasis on the achievable and not merely the desirable.
- The ways: A set of recommendations on the strategies needed to achieve these results, including the timing and sequencing of decisions and implementation.
- The means: A set of recommendations on (1) the tools and resources needed to implement the strategy; and (2) management and organizational reforms that will improve outcomes and efficiency.
- The metrics: A set of recommendations on performance measures to assess outcomes, and—where feasible—impacts.
- The links: An assessment of how the results and recommendations of this review fit into broader interagency, whole-of-government approaches, and into the Administration’s larger foreign policy framework.

== Announcement and initial reception ==
On July 10, 2009, Secretary of State Hillary Clinton announced the initiative at a State Department town hall meeting. The most ambitious of Clinton's departmental reforms, it is modeled after the U.S. Defense Department's Quadrennial Defense Review, which Clinton was familiar with from her days as a United States senator on the Senate Armed Services Committee. Previously the American Academy of Diplomacy had determined that the Secretary of State “lacks the tools – people, competencies, authorities, programs and funding – to execute the President’s foreign policies.” More fundamentally, the department did not even have a methodology in place to know how under-resourced it was.

She appointed Deputy Secretary of State Jacob Lew, Director of Policy Planning Anne-Marie Slaughter, and the United States Agency for International Development Administrator to undertake the review. At the time of the announcement, that was the Acting USAID Administrator, Alonzo Fulgham. (On November 10, 2009, Rajiv Shah was nominated to be USAID Administrator.)

The U.S. Department of Homeland Security also conducts an assessment process, the Quadrennial Homeland Security Review, which is similar to the Defense's review. The Office of the Director of National Intelligence also has something of a similar mechanism. However, the State Department has fewer employees available to conduct such an intensive review as the Pentagon; less than a dozen are expected to be assigned to the QDDR staff, while the Defense Department employs about 100 people for theirs. The State Department also has less institutional experience with long-range planning, being more focused towards the management of immediate diplomatic crises, although the State Department created the Policy Planning Staff in 1947 to integrate long-range planning into the policy-making process. The disparity of resources between State and Defense and the allocation thereof raised questions about State's capacity to implement the planned review.

Former U.S. Ambassador Ronald E. Neumann said that the QDDR was “an intelligent measure” and that Secretary Clinton’s “focus on resources is important and has been too often neglected by secretaries of state who focused only on policy. She understood she’s not going to manage effectively with a busted institution.” The U.S. Global Leadership Coalition commended the creation of the QDDR, calling it "an important step toward elevating and strengthening the civilian-led tools of diplomacy and development." The Project on National Security Reform said it was important for the QDDR to meld a top-down approach to managing resources to a bottom-up approach of examining the needs of each embassy abroad. The Heritage Foundation was skeptical, predicting that "the final QDDR product will repeat past mistakes by maintaining a focus on the traditional official government instruments of foreign aid and will fail to achieve the true integration of all the tools of U.S. foreign and security policy." The Cato Institute was also skeptical, saying that the model, the Pentagon's Quadrennial Defense Review, had produced "a series of vacuous documents that commingle vague, unsubstantiated claims about great historical shifts underway ... with threat inflation. There is no evidence that these documents have produced much beyond wasted time and effort."

== The first review ==
The QDDR held its first meetings in October 2009 at the Willard InterContinental Washington, hosted by the U.S. Global Leadership Coalition. There, Deputy Secretary Lew took care to say that the review process was not cover for an attempt by the State Department to absorb USAID. Some 400 people attended, with many confused by the process and uncertain how they could influence it.

The first Quadrennial Diplomacy and Development Review was completed in December 2010 and was entitled Leading Through Civilian Power; it was presented by Secretary Clinton and USAID Administrator Shah, to employees of both organizations gathered at a town hall meeting. The 150-page document outlined three key factors that would affect the State Department in coming years: limited financial resources due to U.S. budgetary constraints and political realities; a rapidly shifting global landscape that features power being spread across many countries and the prevalence of non-national actors; and the ability to respond to problems caused by weak states and incipient or actual conflict with a flexible corps of civilian expertise.

The review also stressed one of Clinton's signature issues, the role of women around the world. It mentioned women and girls over a 130 times and embraced what became known as "the Hillary Doctrine" by saying, "The protection and empowerment of women and girls is key to the foreign policy and security of the United States."

The review set forth a possible bureaucratic overhaul of the State Department, with a number of goals:

- elevation of "civilian power"
- focus on conflict prevention
- elevation of U.S. ambassadors in coordinating work of all abroad-tasked U.S. agencies
- focus on the issues and needs of particular key 'regional hubs' in the world
- defuse crises before violence; team with Defense Department if that fails
- give USAID the Obama administration's global health and agriculture initiatives
- create an undersecretary for civilian security
- create bureaus for energy resources and counterterrorism
- create new coordinator position for cyber issues

Policy-planning director Anne-Marie Slaughter, the lead architect of the review, said that “What we’re trying to say to Congress is, we get it. We realize we’ve got to prove to you and to the American people that we are good stewards of your money.” The U.S. Global Leadership Coalition viewed the release favorably, saying “The QDDR represents a bold step toward implementing a smart-power foreign policy by elevating our civilian power and ensuring effective, results-driven programs.”

The review would then go to Congress for its review, upon which prospect State Department officials expressed hopefulness; they also wanted Congress to approve making the QDDR a required, regular part of the State Department process. Clinton said, “I am determined that this report will not merely gather dust, like so many others.”

=== Changes at State ===
In implementing changes under the first review, State expanded the scope of two undersecretaries. The Under Secretary for Civilian Security, Democracy, and Human Rights succeeds the Under Secretary for Democracy and Global Affairs with a new Bureau of Counterterrorism (formerly the Office of the Coordinator for Counterterrorism). The Under Secretary for Economic Growth, Energy, and the Environment succeeds the Under Secretary for Economic, Energy, and Agricultural Affairs and included the new Bureau of Energy Resources.

== Proposed legislation ==
In June 2012, Senators John Kerry, Ben Cardin, and Marco Rubio introduced the Quadrennial Diplomacy and Development Review Act of 2012, proposed legislation that would update U.S. foreign policy and assistance programs to reflect the ongoing challenges in the world by setting clear diplomatic and development priorities, assuring that U.S. efforts would be effective and efficient, and clarifying the way progress is evaluated. It passed in the Senate during 2012.

== Kerry tenure ==
Once John Kerry became Secretary of State, speculation began on whether the department would conduct a second QDDR review. In February 2014, Kerry appointed Thomas Perriello to be Special Representative for the Quadrennial Diplomacy and Development Review, and then Kerry announced the public launch of the review in April 2014, with the goal being to "identify emerging policy and management priorities and the organizational capabilities needed to maximize the impact and efficiency of this nation's diplomacy and development investments."

== The second review ==
The second Quadrennial Diplomacy and Development Review was released on April 28, 2015. It outlined four worldwide priorities for the State Department and USAID:

- Preventing and mitigating conflict and violent extremism
- Promoting open, resilient, and democratic societies
- Advancing inclusive economic growth
- Mitigating and adapting to climate change

== Subsequent status ==
No Quadrennial Diplomacy and Development Review effort was undertaken by the State Department under the tenures of Rex Tillerson and Mike Pompeo. Whether one will during the tenure of Antony Blinken, or any secretary after him, remains to be seen.
