= Conviction politics =

Campaigning on own values rather than consensus or polls

Conviction politics is the practice of campaigning based on a politician's own fundamental values or ideas rather than attempting to represent an existing consensus or simply take positions that are popular in polls. On the political right, the term has been adopted by politicians like Margaret Thatcher, who declared "I am not a consensus politician. I am a conviction politician" in 1979, a few months before her election as prime minister.

== Theory ==
There are a number of arguments for conviction politics. One is that it is more honest; conviction politicians simply say what they believe rather than shading their opinions to be more palatable to their audience. Another is that by voicing strong opinions, they push public debate forward and promote a genuine discussion of political issues. Even if the candidates lose, they will have promoted their particular political ideas and persuaded some voters of their value. There are also more instrumental reasons. By arguing forcefully for their positions during the campaign, politicians are more able to pursue the goals once in office. Also, proponents argue that conviction politicians are more likely to win. When he was a candidate, Tom Perriello stated: "More often, the deepest connection with another person comes from when I disagree with them and admit it, because at least they know I will tell the truth. While some strategists focus on positioning candidates on issue after issue, I believe most voters focus more on whether the candidate integrity and character on the whole, demonstrated by the conviction to take a stand."

By saying what they believe and ignoring the polls, conviction politicians distinguish themselves from other politicians. Democratic Party politician and senator Paul Wellstone frequently heard voters tell him: "I don't always agree with you, but I like it that I know where you stand." He found that when he announced his opposition to the 2003 invasion of Iraq, an unpopular position at the time, he jumped to a five-point lead in the polls. In the United States, 87% of voters in one poll said they think politicians are "pretty much willing to say whatever it takes in order to get themselves elected".

== History ==
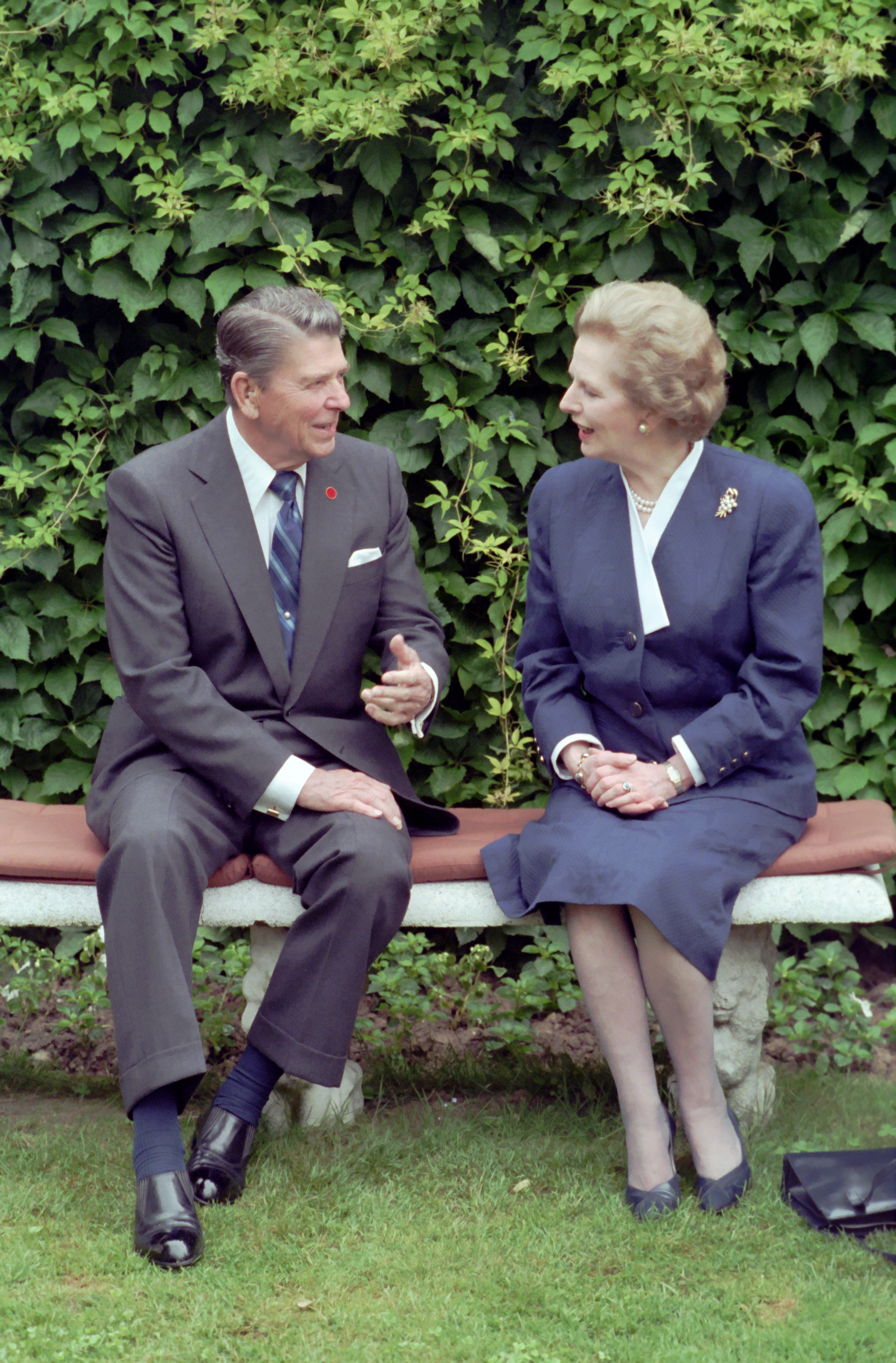
Margaret Thatcher with close ally and friend, United States president Ronald Reagan, in 1987

Thatcher, like her contemporary Ronald Reagan in the United States, argued that her leadership should be a time for big, bold changes, grounded in the central principles of her ideology. "It was not a set of policies cobbled together from minute to minute, begged, borrowed or stolen from other people," she said while describing her government. "It was successful because it was based on clear, firmly-held principles." A devout Methodist, she further defended the principles as being grounded in the Christian Bible: "I believe that by taking together these key elements from the Old and New Testaments, we gain a view of the universe, a proper attitude to work and principles to shape economic and social life. We are told we must work and use our talents to create wealth."

Her thinking on the subject was influenced by Keith Joseph, sometimes considered the "intellectual leader" of modern British conservatism, and the man Thatcher called "my closest political friend". Joseph had developed an intellectual critique of the reigning post-war and Keynesian consensus and criticized the "consensus politics" that continued to promote it. In 2007, the prime minister Gordon Brown announced he too was "a conviction politician" after private talks with Thatcher in a 10 Downing Street visit. He was criticised for the gaffe as being inappropriate for a Labour Party politician to identify with the 81-year-old former Conservative prime minister.

In the United States, Democratic Party politician and senator Paul Wellstone was a major proponent of conviction politics from the political left, promoting peace, environmental and labour protections, and health care. After Wellstone's death in 2002, his longtime aide and campaign manager, Jeff Blodgett, founded Wellstone Action, which promotes conviction politics through education and training. Tom Perriello, a Democratic Party politician and representative from Virginia, explicitly ran his successful campaign based on "conviction politics". He argued that a politician who acts on principle is more trustworthy than one that acts on electability, and decried pandering to voters.

There is interaction between religious commitment, engagement, and strong moral convictions in determining electoral outcomes. There is also a connection between voters' political behavior and their moral convictions.

== Criticism ==
Margaret Thatcher with George H. W. Bush in 1987

The conviction politics practiced by George W. Bush has been called a "hard ideology" with "religious and chauvinistic underpinnings" and "contributed to the call by Muslim fundamentalists to a broader jihad" that has "redefined the war on terror and alienated Arab and Muslim public opinion."

Critics of Thatcher's conviction politics say it "burst apart the old consensus", and has "fostered dissensus". Some critics have even said that conviction politics, especially in the United States, are "theological politics".

== See also ==
- Identity politics
- Racial politics
- Testimonial party
