= Emil Armin =

American artist

- Born: 1 April 1883; Rădăuți, Austria-Hungary (now Romania)
- Died: 2 July 1971 (aged 88); Chicago, Illinois
- Education: School of the Art Institute of Chicago
- Known for: Painting
- Notable work: Mountain Farm, Santa Fe (1928)
- Movement: Modernism

Emil Armin (1 April 1883 – 2 July 1971) was an American artist known for his use of vibrant color and brushwork. From the 1920s through his death in 1971, Armin maintained a high profile in Chicago's artistic community.

Art critic Samuel Putnam, of the Chicago Evening Post, described Armin as "perhaps the most finely sensitized artist in Chicago…with a soul of a peasant and poet and the mind of a philosopher."

== Early life and education ==
Armin was born in Rădăuți, Austria-Hungary (now Romania) in 1883. His grandfather was a Jewish scribe, copying sacred scrolls for the local synagogue. Armin began drawing at the age of five and presumably learned woodcarving from his father, Hirsch Lieb, who was an amateur artist.

When Armin was 10, his parents died. He was raised by older siblings until he got a full-time job at a restaurant at age 14 and moved into the home of the owner. In 1901, when he was 18, he moved to Chernivtsi to study art after a restaurant patron encourage him to attend art school.

In 1905, Armin emigrated to the United States, to join his siblings Sigmund and Frieda in Chicago, where he continued to draw sketches whenever he could while unhappily working in a wealthy cousin's store.

Armin began his studies at the School of the Art Institute of Chicago in 1908, and he continued working and studying whenever possible, even through periods of great economic struggle. In 1916, having saved four hundred dollars from his many jobs, he transitioned from taking only night classes to taking day classes as a full-time student, pausing only once during World War I to take a job making artillery harnesses at eighteen dollars a week.

He studied under, and was inspired by, George Bellows, Randall Davey and Herman Sachs. Other instructors included Enella Benedict, Albert Henry Krehbiel, Antonin Sterba, John W. Norton and Harry L. Timmins. In the spring of 1920, at age 36 and twelve years after he first enrolled in a night class, Armin graduated.

=== Early work ===
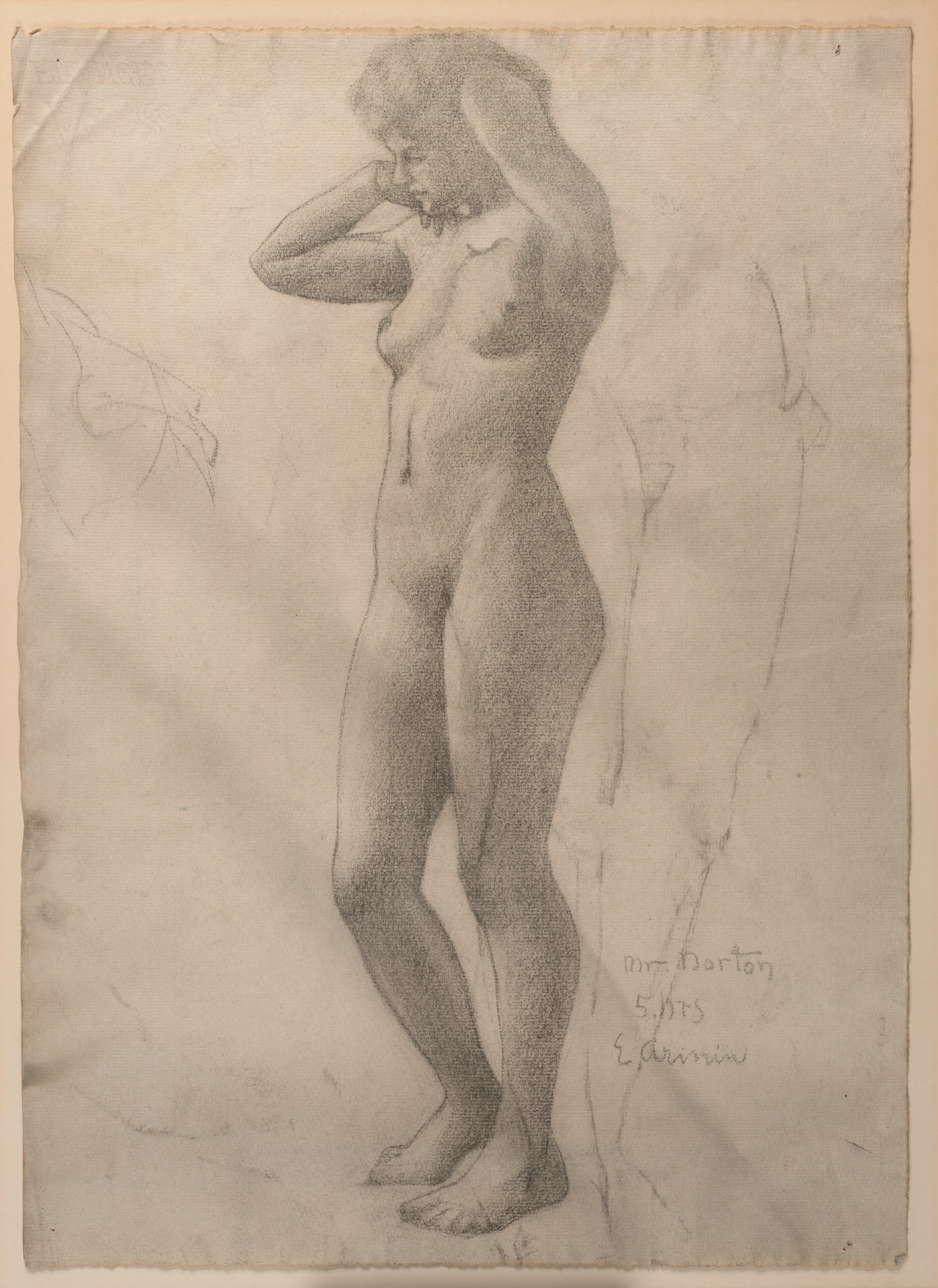
Untitled Drawing (1917), Private Collection

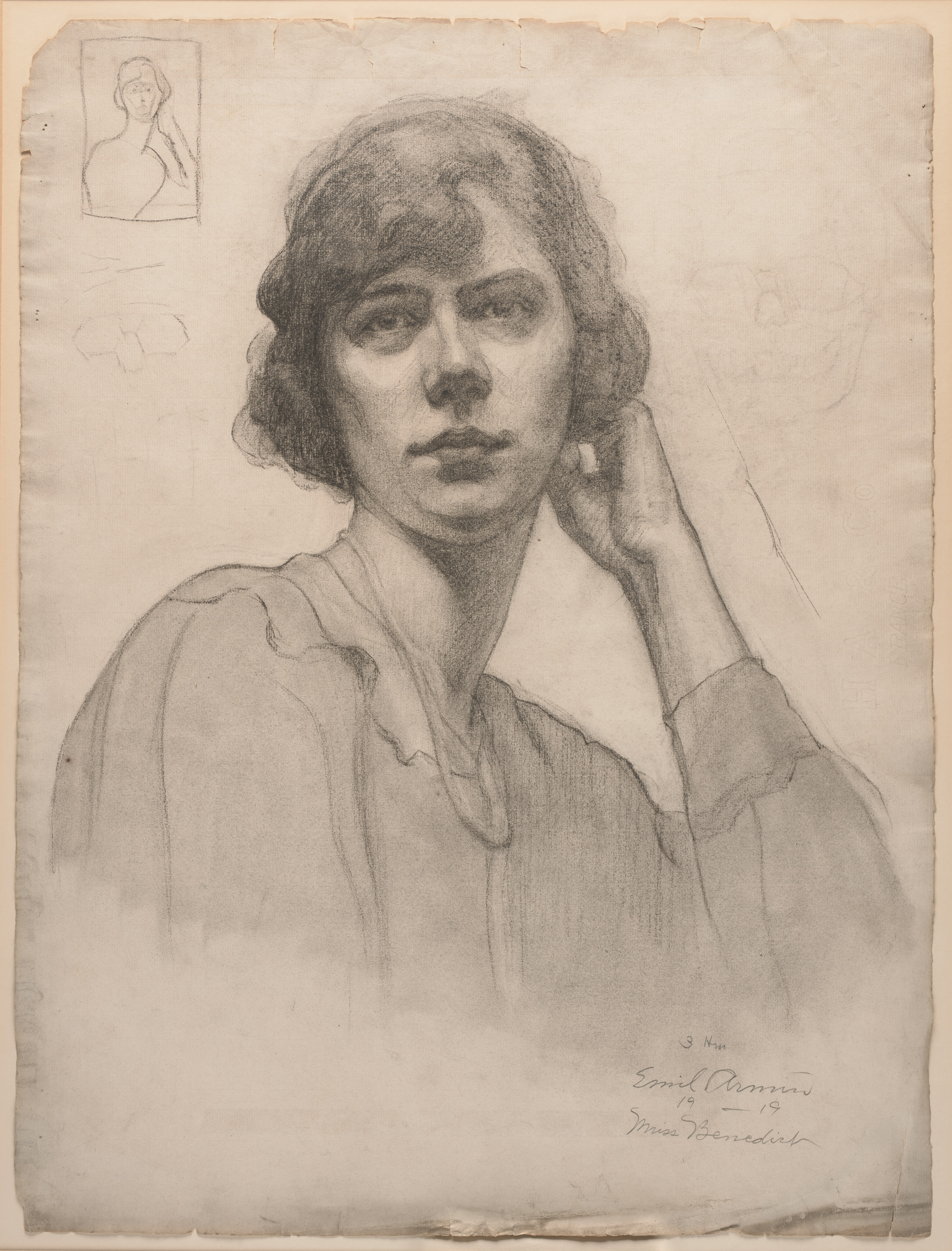
Untitled Drawing (1919), Private Collection

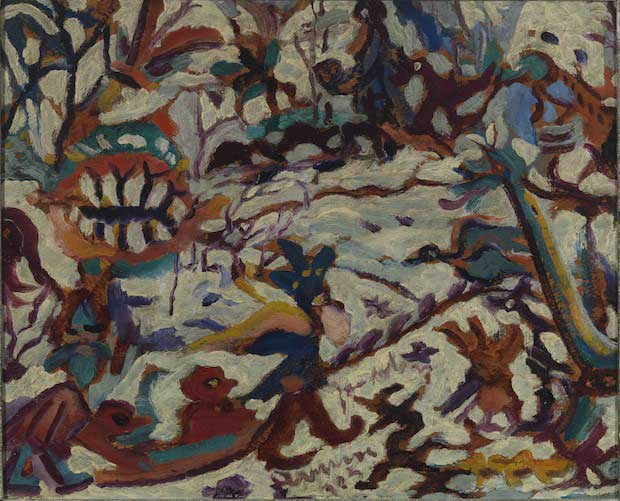
Fairyland (1922), Bernard Friedman Collection

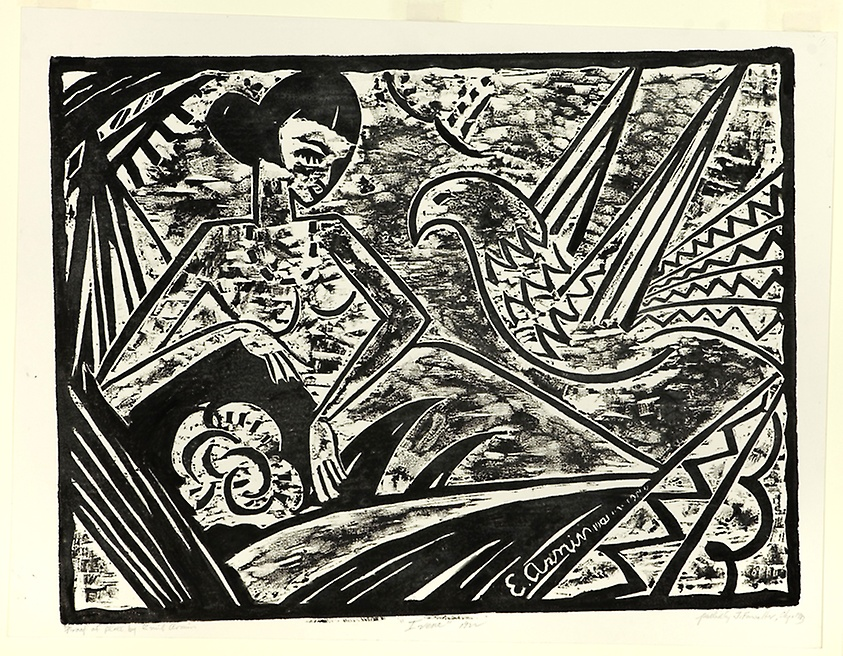
Irene (1922), The Art Institute of Chicago

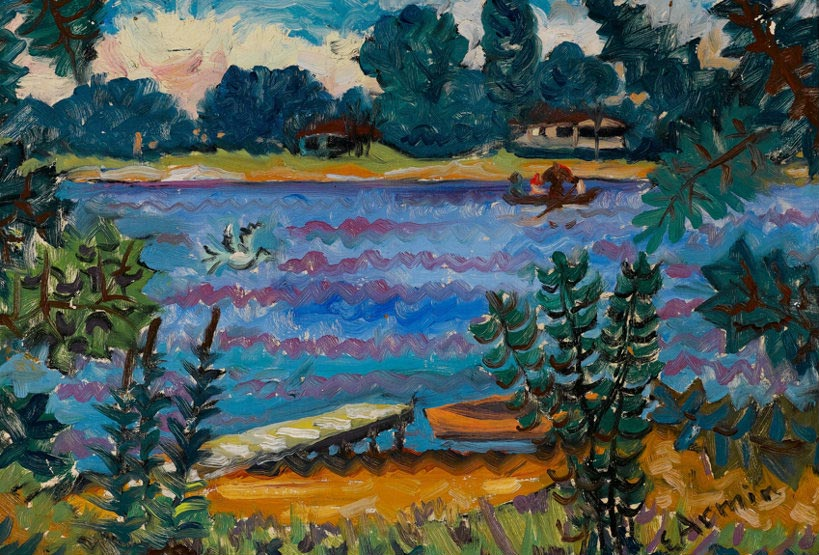
Wood Lake (1924), Lakewood, Michigan

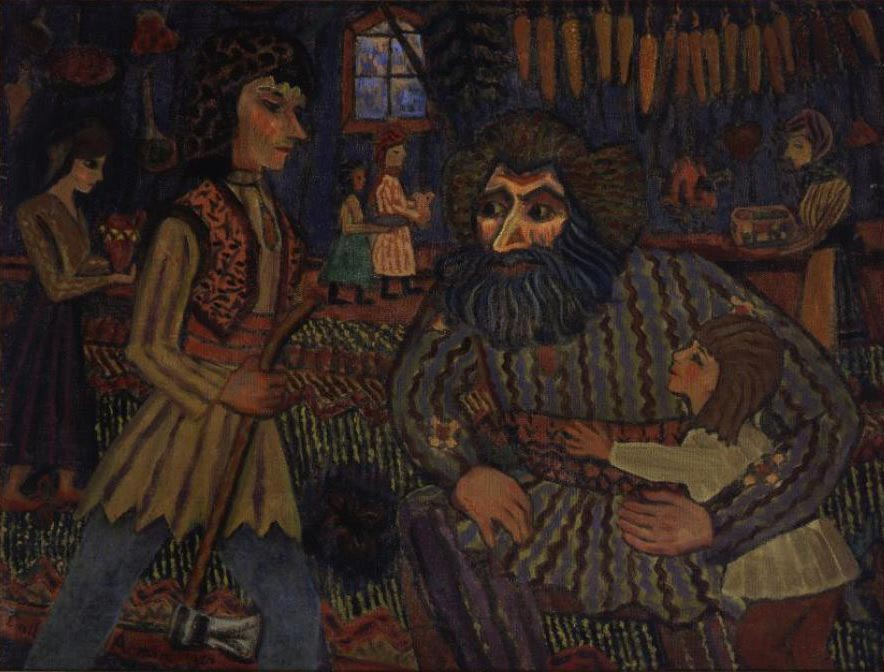
The Dream (1924), Smart Museum, University of Chicago

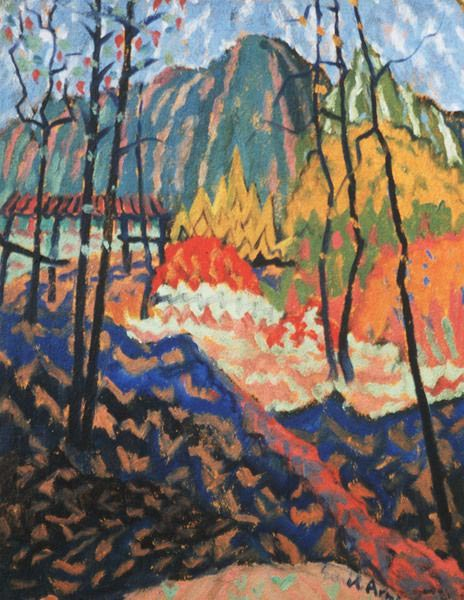
Untitled (Mountain) (1924), Richard Norton Gallery

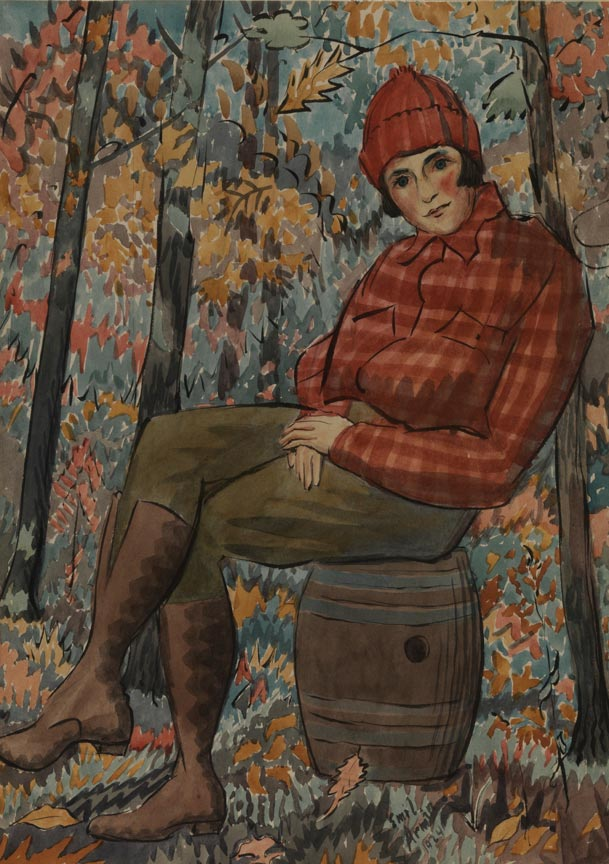
Frances Strain (1924), Pennsylvania Academy of the Fine Arts Collection

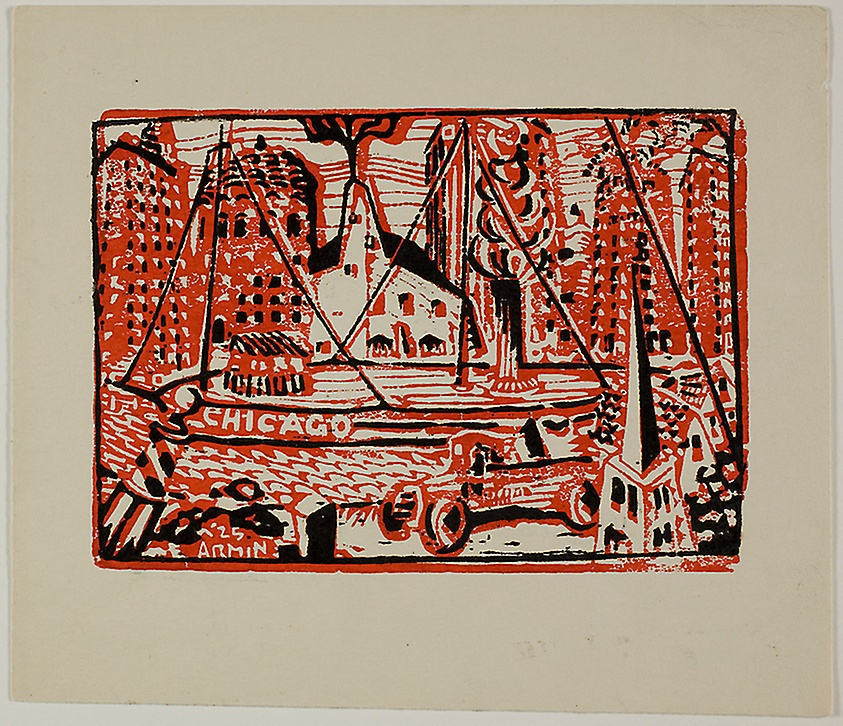
Chicago (1925), The Art Institute of Chicago

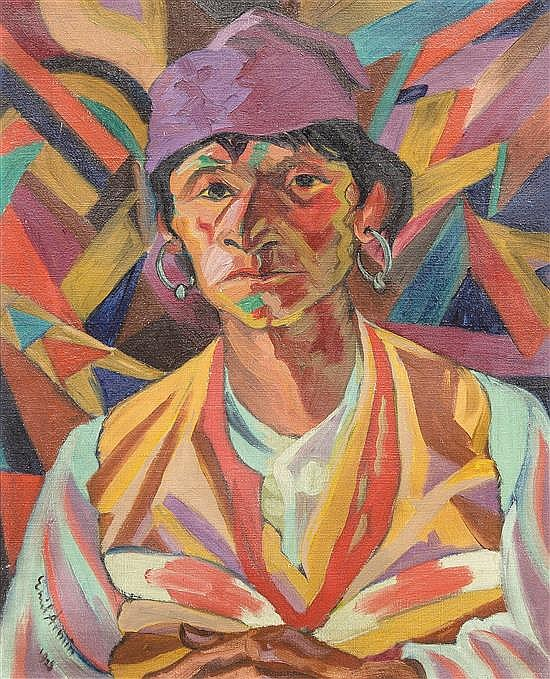
Portrait by Emil Armin, (1925), Private Collection

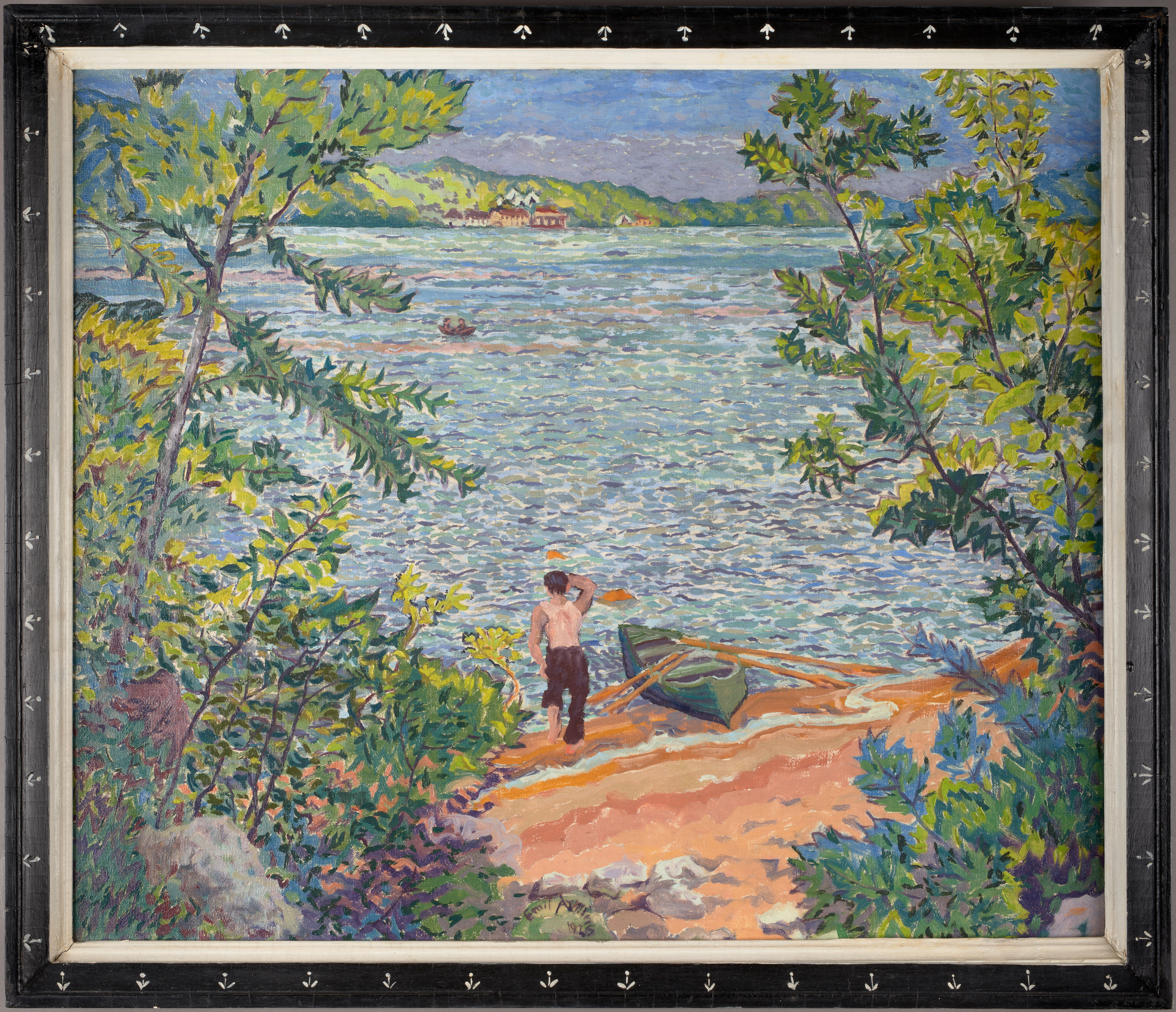
Oil Painting by Emil Armin, (1925), Private Collection

Bookplate by Emil Armin, (1925), Made for Jun Fujita, Graham and Pamela Lee Collection

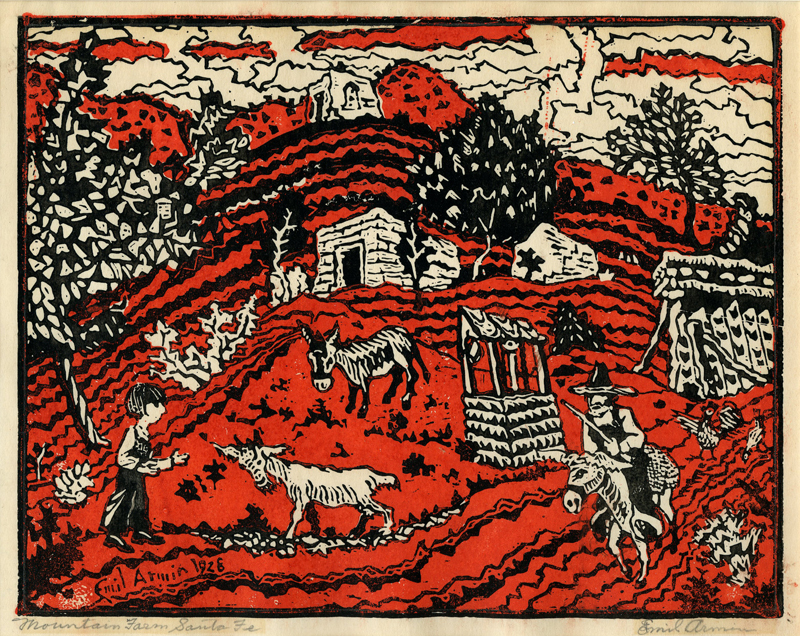
Mountain Farm, Santa Fe by Emil Armin, (1926), The Art Institute of Chicago

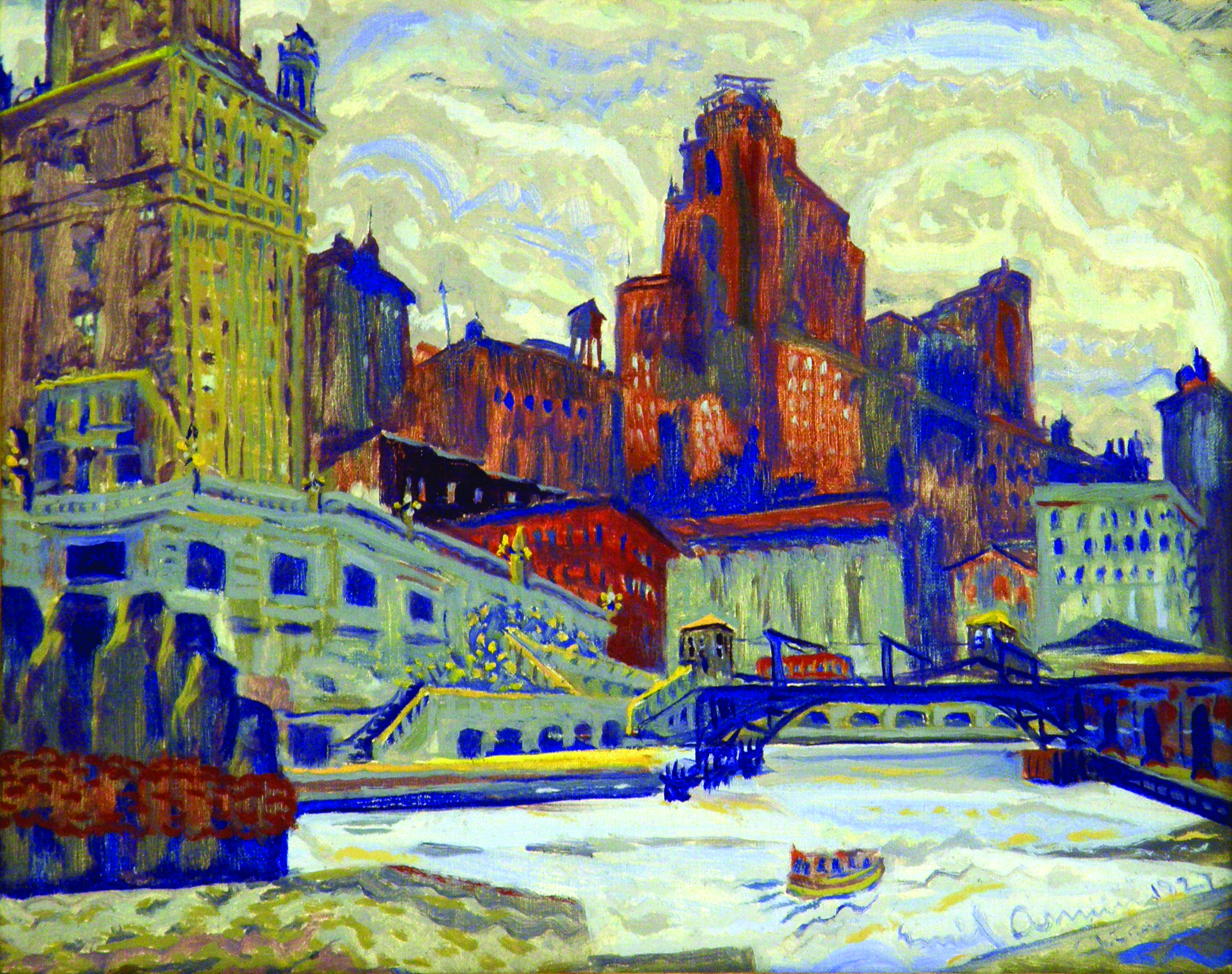
The Gateway by Emil Armin, (1927), Ohio Arts Council

== Career ==
Armin's artwork included paintings, woodcuts, woodcarvings, sculptures, cartoons and etchings, but he is best known for his paintings. He was a modernist painter, with a fondness for painting landscapes, primitive peoples, flowers and animals.

In his work, Armin synthesized contemporary artistic trends with inspiration drawn from his Jewish roots and from the peasant traditions of the American Southwest and his native Eastern Europe.

Most of his work was completed in Chicago. After finishing his studies, Armin joined a group of artists, including Gertrude Abercrombie, Francis Strain and Charles Biesel, at the 57th Street Art Colony in Hyde Park, near Stony island Avenue, where he lived and worked until 1925. (This group of artists was called the Fifty Seventh Street Group and were also known as the Jackson Park Colony. Other notable artists that joined included Frances Foy, Gustaf Dalstrom and Beatrice S. Levy.)

Armin then shared an art studio with fellow modernist Todros Geller at 59 East Adams from 1926 to 1930. He then briefly moved to the North Side of Chicago, where he worked and lived at 927 Sunnyside Avenue before permanently relocating back to the South Side on Harper Avenue in Hyde Park.

His Chicago exhibits in the 1920s included the No-Jury Society, Cor Ardens, Neo-Arlimusc, and the Chicago Society of Artists. In the 1930s he entered the Grant Park Art Fair, and he worked as an easel painter for the Works Progress Administration (WPA). In 1940, Armin secured a job working for the Illinois Art Project. In this post Armin visited other artists working for the Project offering advice and criticism. It was also in 1940 that Armin, along with other local Jewish artists, formed the American Jewish Art Club and continued to exhibit with them until his death.

Expanding his horizons beyond Chicago, Armin also traveled to work, briefly relocating to Dayton and making trips to the Indiana Dunes, the Wisconsin Dells, New Mexico, Maine and later in life to Lake Chapala in Mexico.

Over time, Armin was able to make a modest living as an artist, selling his art and making ends meet with occasional jobs teaching art, including working with the Jewish Board of Education and teaching at Hull House.

Armin exhibited regionally and nationally until he died at age 88.

=== Works Progress Administration (WPA) artwork ===
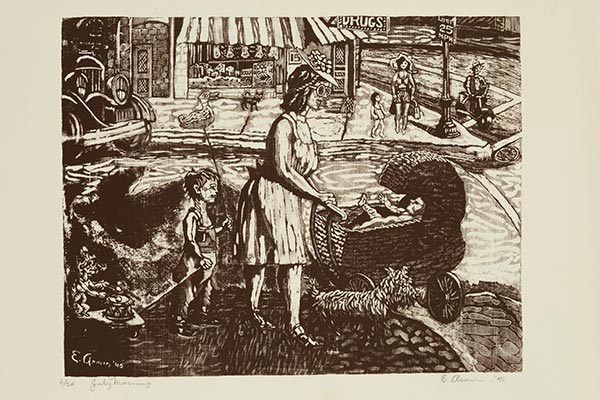
July Morning (1940), WPA, Federal Art Project

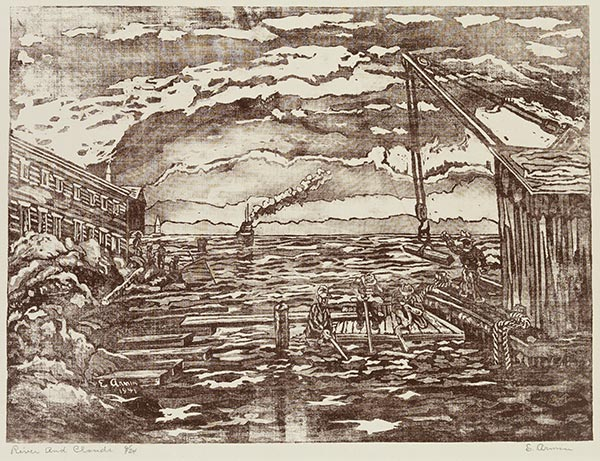
River and Clouds (1941), WPA, Federal Art Project

== Approach to art ==
Armin believed that "the way an artist finds it necessary to live in modern times will automatically assert itself in his work, if he is a true and independent artist."

== Critical response ==
Armin made an impression with the local Chicago art critics. J. Z. Jacobson, an art critic for The Chicagoan, covered Armin's work and eventually wrote a full book on Armin called Thirty-Five Saints and Emil Armin, in which he described Armin as "Playful as a child. Solemn as a prophet. Funny as a clown. Poor as St. Francis of Assisi and almost as happy. Taking the slings and arrows of outrageous fate with stoic calm."

== Role in Chicago Modernism ==
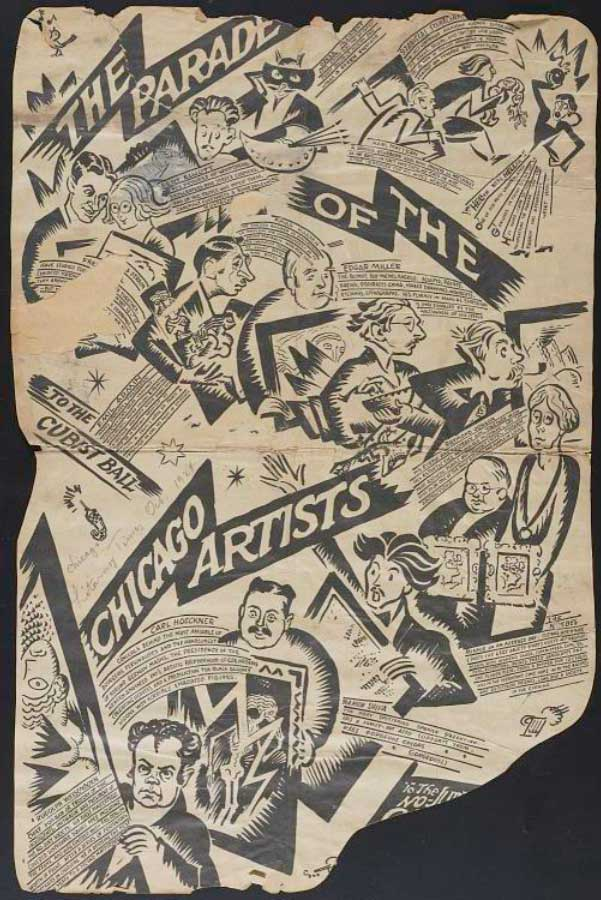
Ad designed by Armin for the No-Jury Society's 1923 Cubist Ball

Following his graduation in 1920, Armin became an active member in Chicago's emerging modernist art community, which emphasized freedom of individual expression as its sole doctrine. (Art historian Sue Ann Price has described the Chicago Modernism movement as the "city's vitriolic struggle between an old guard who advanced the ideals of traditional nineteenth-century art and an avantgarde of painters, illustrators, photographers, and sculptors who espoused the new modernist art from Europe.")

In 1913, Armin had visited the controversial Armory Show when it was exhibited at the Art Institute, and he fell under the sway of European and American modernism.

Inspired by the modernist movement, Armin and other Chicago artists formed their own open and free groups—including The Introspectives, the Cor Ardens, Chicago No-Jury Society of Artists, and Neo-Arlimusc—to provide an alternative to the conservative Art Institute of Chicago.

Active in all of these groups, Armin exhibited in every one of the No-Jury Society's shows beginning with the second, and eventually served as president of the Society. He also exhibited with the Chicago Society of Artists, which had taken a contentious turn to modernism in 1923.

== Marriage and family ==
In 1945, at the age of 65, Armin married Hilda Rose Diamond, a social worker for the Jewish Family and Community Service in Chicago.
