= Carl Hoeckner =

American artist

- Born: 1883; Munich, Germany
- Died: 1972 (aged 88–89); Berkeley, California
- Known for: Painter, printmaker

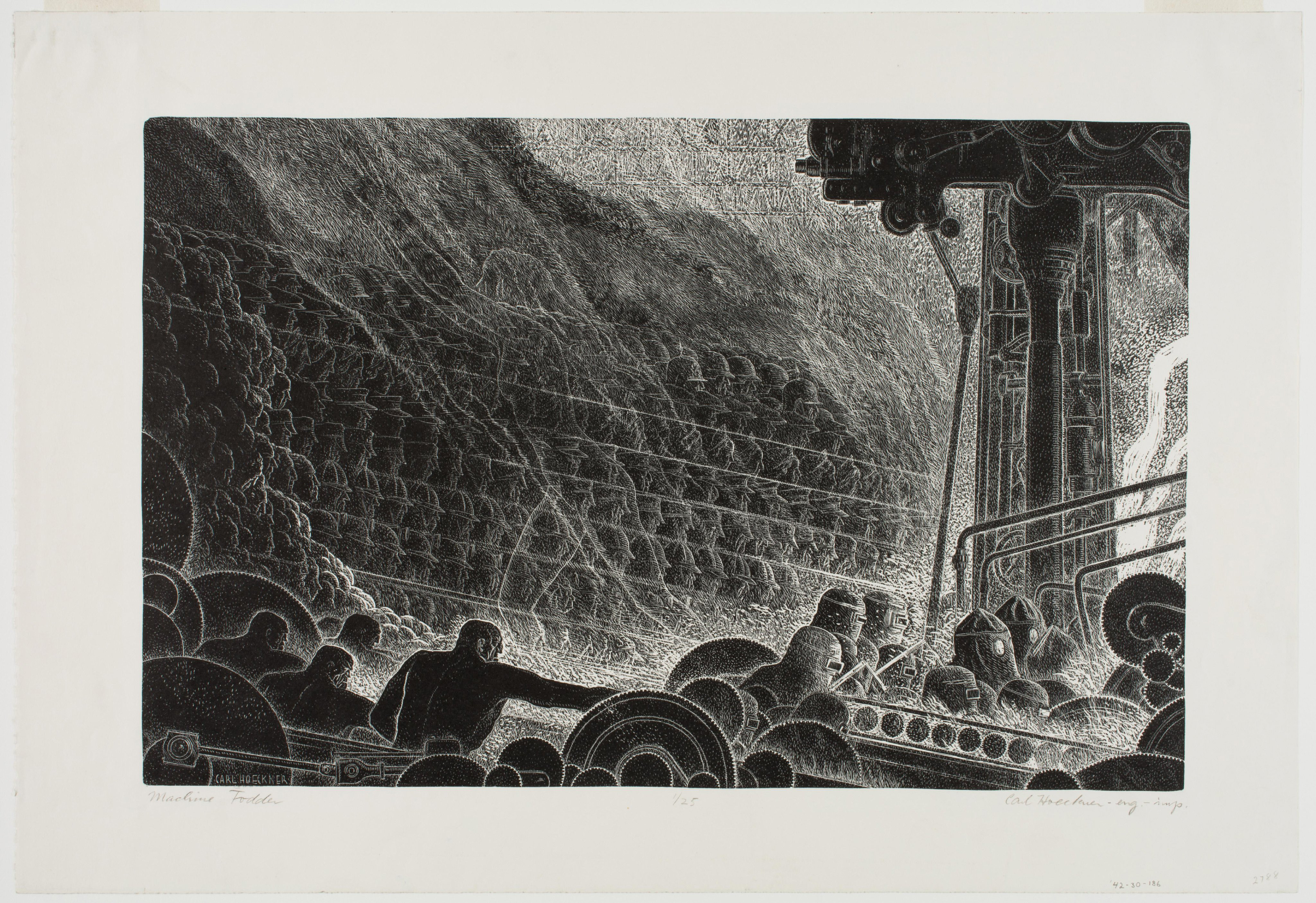
Carl Hoeckner - Machine Fodder, c. 1938

Carl Hoeckner (1883–1972) is an American artist active in Chicago during the Great Depression.

== Biography ==
Hoeckner was born in 1883 in Munich, Germany. In 1910 he immigrated to Chicago. His first job in the United States was as an illustrator in the advertising department of Armour and Company, a meatpacking company in Chicago. He went on to work in the advertising department of Marshall Field's department store.

Hoeckner was active in the Chicago art scene. He was a member of the Palette and Chisel Club and the American Artists' Congress. He was associated with fellow artists Ramon Shiva, Rudolph Weisenborn, and Beatrice S. Levy. In 1921 he helped organize a showing of about 300 works at the A. M. Rothschild & Company Store. In 1922 he helped found the Chicago No-Jury Society of Artists. In the 1930s he worked for the graphics division for the Works Progress Administration Illinois Art Project. From 1929 to 1943 he taught at the School of the Art Institute of Chicago. Hoeckner exhibited with the Chicago Society of Artists and the Chicago Society of Etchers.

Hoeckner died in 1972 in Berkeley, California.

His work is in the Art Institute of Chicago, Crystal Bridges Museum of American Art, the Library of Congress, the Metropolitan Museum of Art, the Monterey Museum of Art, the Museum of Modern Art, the National Gallery of Art, the Philadelphia Museum of Art, the Smithsonian American Art Museum, and the Whitney Museum of American Art.
