= Bernece Berkman =

American painter (1911–1988)

Bernece Berkman-Hunter
- Born: Bernece Berkman; 1911; Chicago, Illinois, U.S.
- Died: 1988 (aged 76–77); New York, New York
- Education: School of the Art Institute of Chicago (SAIC)
- Known for: Painter, graphic artist, designer, screenprinter, lithographer, teacher
- Movement: Regionalism
- Spouse: Oscar H. Hunter (m. 1946; divorced in 1976)

Bernece Berkman (1911–1988), known as Bernece Berkman-Hunter after marriage, was an American painter born in Chicago, Illinois. She was inspired by what she saw in urban Chicago during the Great Depression and is best known for paintings depicting the plight of industrial workers and the poor.

== Life and career ==
Berkman-Hunter, née Berkman, was born in 1911 in Chicago. She took evening sketching classes in Todros Geller's studio and studied oil painting with Geller. Rudolph Weisenborn was another early influence. Working with both of these artists, Berkman was introduced to Cubism and Expressionism and her work became more political in nature. She also studied briefly in New York at Hunter College and at The New School for Social Research under Stuart Davis.

In 1934, Berkman-Hunter's work was exhibited for the first time in a group show of Jewish artists at the Palmer House in Chicago. In 1939 she exhibited a painting at the New York World's Fair. Berkman-Hunter's work was included in the 1940 MoMA show American Color Prints Under $10. The show was organized as a vehicle for bringing affordable fine art prints to the general public.

She married Oscar H. Hunter, an African-American writer, in 1946. Together they founded a wallpaper company, Berk-Hunter Associates, in 1949. They divorced in 1976.

In 1947, she was included in the Dallas Museum of Fine Arts exhibition of the National Serigraph Society artists.

In 1972, she traveled to France and Italy. Her travel diary is housed at the Library of Congress.

She was an active member of the artistic community in Chicago and New York, and belonged to the Chicago Society of Artists and the Chicago Women's Salon.

Berkman-Hunter died in 1988 in New York.

== Exhibitions ==
- American Artists Congress, 1937
- Denver Art Museum, 1938
- Springfield (MA) Museum of Fine Art
- WPA Exhibition, Art Institute of Chicago, 1938
- New York World's Fair, 1939
- International Water Color Exhibition, Art Institute of Chicago, 1940
- Chicago and Vicinity Exhibit, Art Institute of Chicago, 1940–41
- After the Great Crash: New Deal Art in Illinois, Illinois State Museum, Springfield (IL), 1983

== Selected works ==
- Jews in Flight (1939)
- Untitled, Man in the City (1943)

== Collections ==
- The Art Institute of Chicago
- Carnegie Museum of Art
- Evansville State Hospital
- Bernard Friedman Collection
- Seattle Art Museum
- Smithsonian American Art Museum
- University of Iowa
- University of Michigan
- University of Nebraska, Omaha
