= Orval Caldwell =

American painter

Orval Halleck Caldwell
- Born: February 15, 1895; Shelbyville, Illinois, US
- Died: February 18, 1972 (aged 77); Wheaton, Illinois, US

Orval Halleck Caldwell (February 15, 1895 – February 18, 1972) was a Chicago-area painter. He was a prolific painter of landscapes in both oil and watercolor.

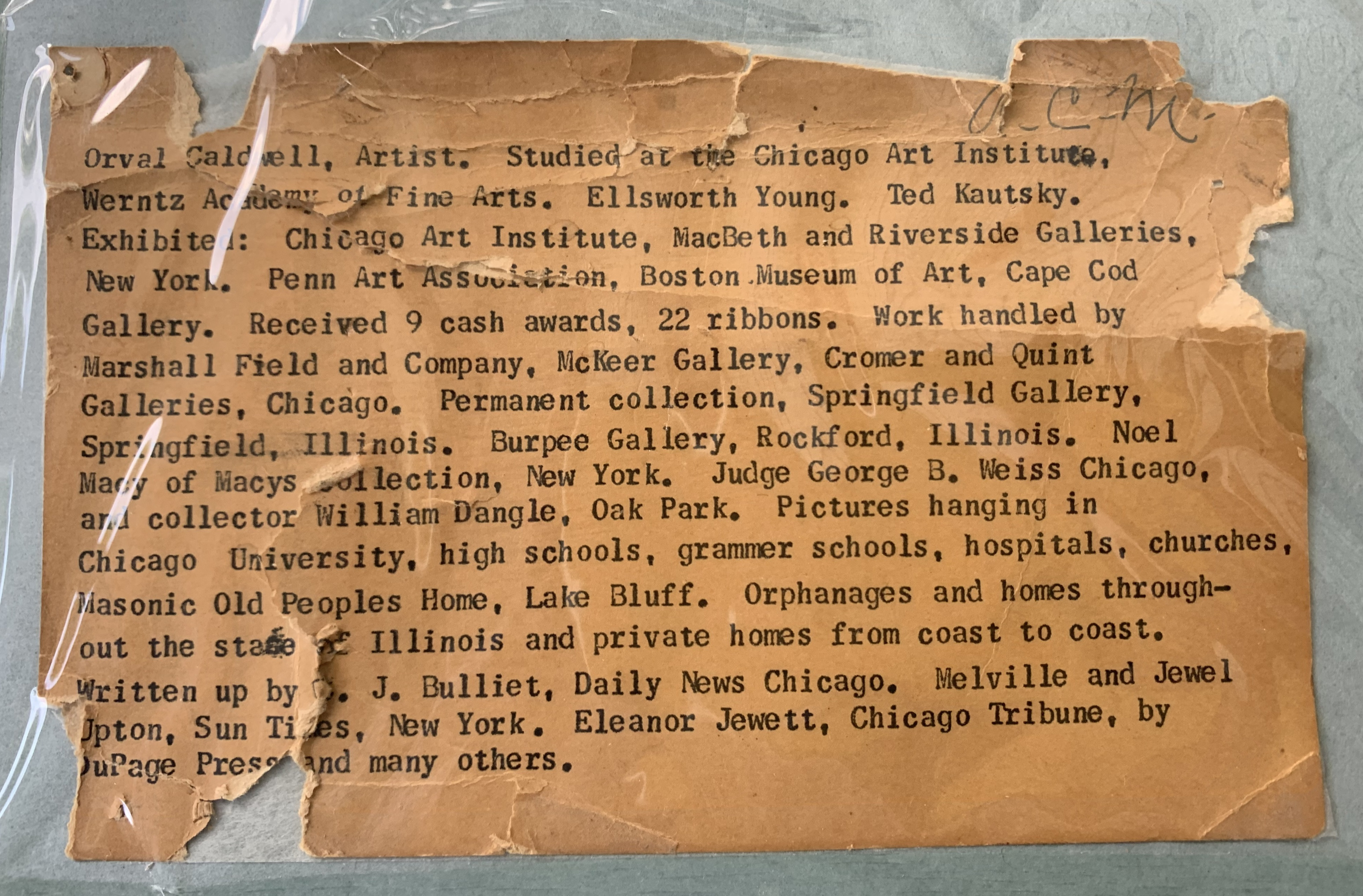
Undated gallery tag for Front Line Autumn

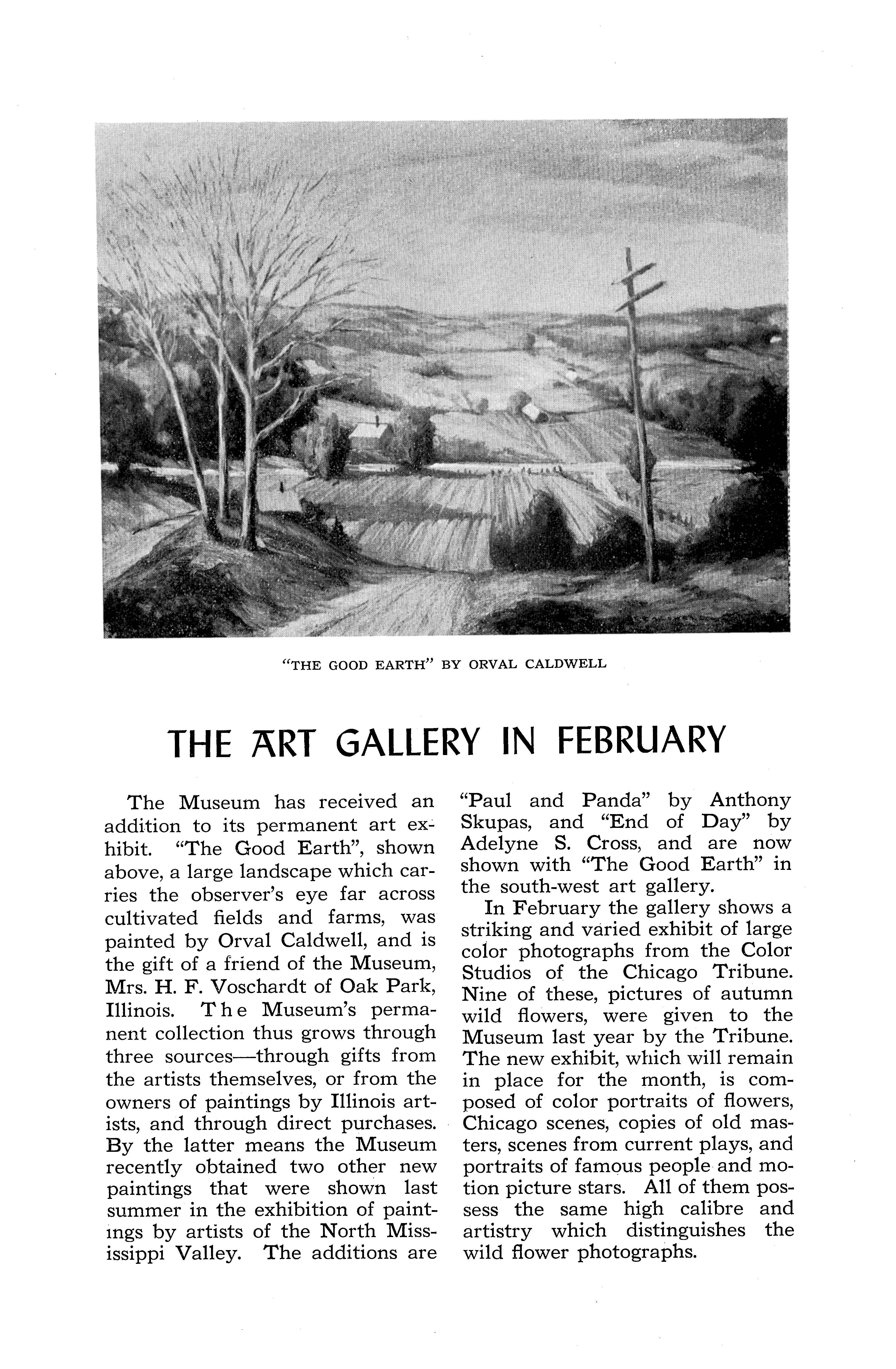
Page from the February 1941 issue of The Living Museum, published by the Illinois State Museum

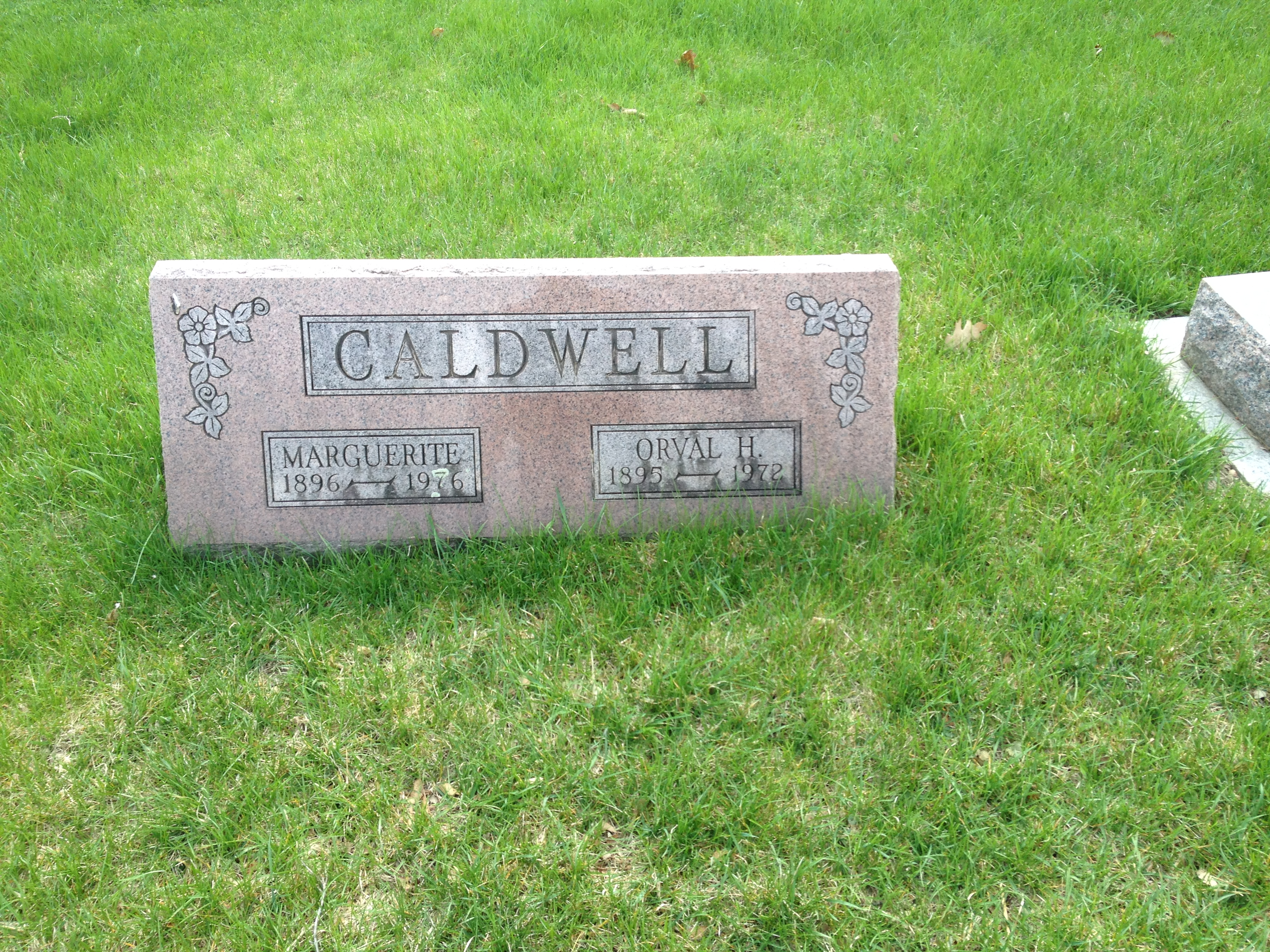
Orval Caldwell's gravestone in Naperville, Illinois

== Family life ==
Orval Caldwell was born to George H. and Mary Caldwell on February 15, 1895, in Shelbyville in rural Central Illinois. An only child, at the age of 15, Caldwell lived with his parents in Proviso Township, Cook County, in the western suburbs of Chicago, and his father worked as a broker in the Chicago Board of Trade. At the age of 25, Caldwell continued to be single, living with his parents in Forest Park, Cook County, and he joined his father as a broker in the Chicago Board of Trade. Four years later, in 1924, Caldwell's mother died. By 1930, Caldwell married Marguerite Friedley, a public school teacher, has his own house in Proviso Township, Cook County and continued to work as a broker at the Chicago Board of Trade. By 1940, the US census records list Caldwell as a freelance artist and his wife as a public school teacher. The Caldwells had no children and remained in Cook County until Orval died on February 18, 1972, and Marguerite on April 13, 1976. The couple are buried in Naperville, Illinois, cemetery.

== Artistic career ==
Art was a second career for Caldwell, who initially made his living as a commodities broker. Between 1930 and 1940, Caldwell transitioned from a hobbyist painter to a full-time artist. What little is known of Caldwell's art training comes from gallery tags attached to his various paintings. From those we learn that Caldwell studied at the Art Institute of Chicago, Werntz' Academy of Fine Arts, and with painters Ellsworth Young and Ted Kautsky. Those tags also say that Caldwell exhibited at the Art Institute of Chicago, Penn Art Association and the Boston Museum of Art.

According to newspaper accounts, Caldwell was a member of the Chicago Society of Artists and the Chicago No-Jury Society. In 1940 and 1941, he was president of the No-Jury Society, a group founded in 1922. He was also a member of the Oak Park and River Forest Art League, and the Maywood Art League.

His works have been acquired by the Springfield Gallery, the Burpee Gallery in Rockford, Illinois, the Rockford Art Museum, and the Illinois State Museum.

The February 1941 issue of The Living Museum, the official magazine of the Illinois State Museum, devotes a full page to The Good Earth, a Caldwell by painting added to the museum's permanent collection, which is described as "a large landscape which carries the observer's eye far across cultivated fields and farms." The Good Earth was exhibited at the 1939 Annual Exhibition of Artists of Chicago and Vicinity at the Art Institute of Chicago.

Caldwell's works have been reviewed by Melvin and Jewel Upton (New York Sun Times), Eleanor Jewett (Chicago Tribune), and C. J. Bulliet (Chicago Daily News).

Caldwell is listed in Who Was Who in American Art, Davenport's Art Reference & Price Guide, American Art Directory (1941) and Falk's Annual Exhibition Record of the Art Institute of Chicago.

== Exhibitions ==
- 1940—No-Jury Society,
- 1940—All Illinois Society of the Fine Arts.
- 1941—No-Jury Society.
- 1942—Austin, Oak Park, and River Forest Art League.
- 1944—Austin, Oak Park, and River Forest Art League.
- 1944—Chicago Society of Artists annual show.
- 1945—Chicago Society of Artists annual show.
- 1947—Chicago Society of Artists annual show.
- 1950—Chicago Society of Artists annual show.
- 1954—Chicago Society of Artists annual show.
- 1956—Chicago Society of Artists annual show.
