= John Christen Johansen =

Danish-American portrait painter (1876–1964)

- Born: 25 November 1876; Copenhagen, Denmark
- Died: 23 May 1964 (aged 87)
- Spouse: M. Jean McLane
- Children: Margaret, John

John Christen Johansen (25 November 1876 – 23 May 1964) was a Danish-American portraitist. His work was part of the art competitions at the 1928 Summer Olympics and the 1932 Summer Olympics.

== Background ==
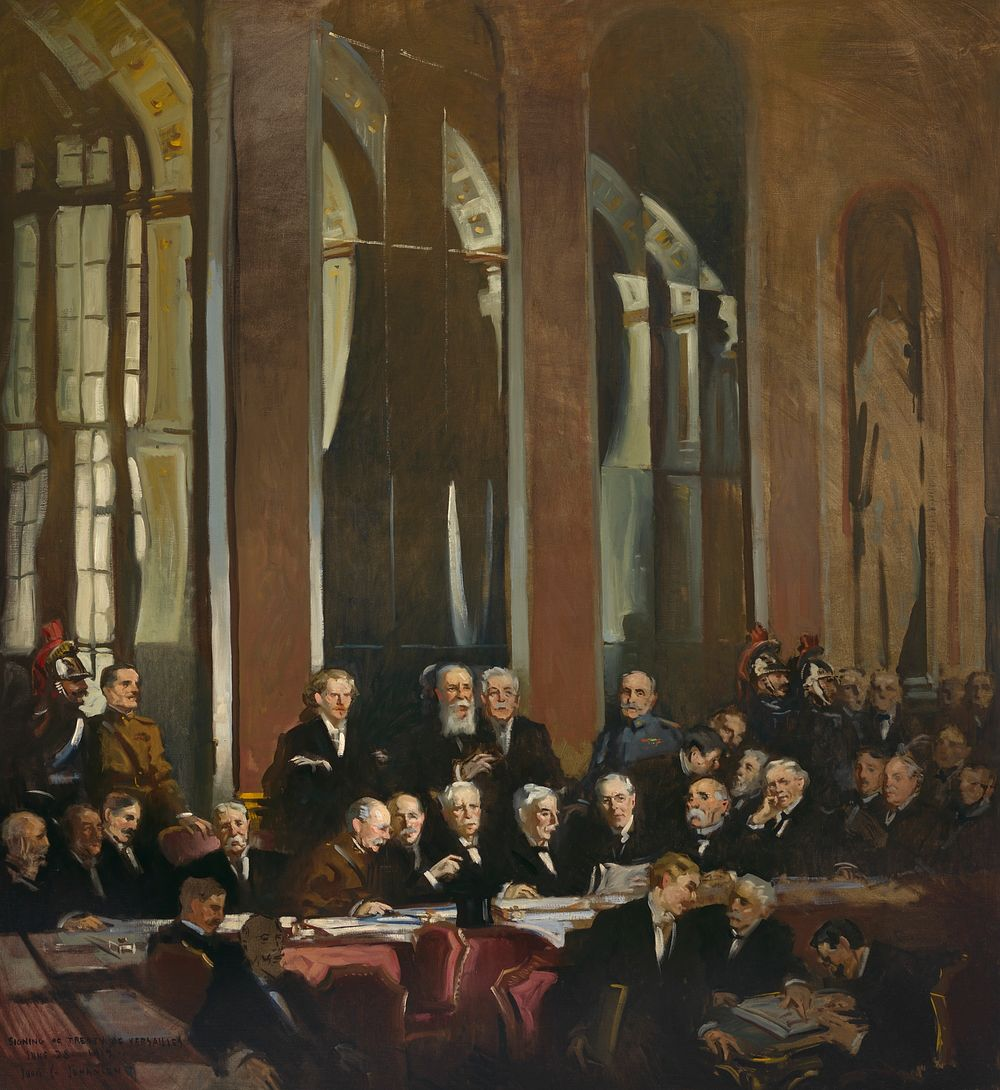
John Christen Johansen, Signing of the Treaty of Versailles, 1919

Johansen was born in Copenhagen and came to America as an infant. He studied in Cincinnati under Frank Duveneck and later at the School of the Art Institute of Chicago where he taught from 1901 to 1911. While a member of the faculty of the Art Institute he met, and later wed, recognized portraitist M. Jean McLane (1878–1964). Before focusing primarily on portraiture Johansen painted landscapes. In 1915 he was elected to the National Academy of Design.

== Career ==
Leaving Chicago in 1919, Johansen moved to Paris, where he studied at the Académie Julian where he learned academic technique while being exposed to the ideas of modernism. He maintained friendships with other artists including James Abbott McNeill Whistler and John Singer Sargent.

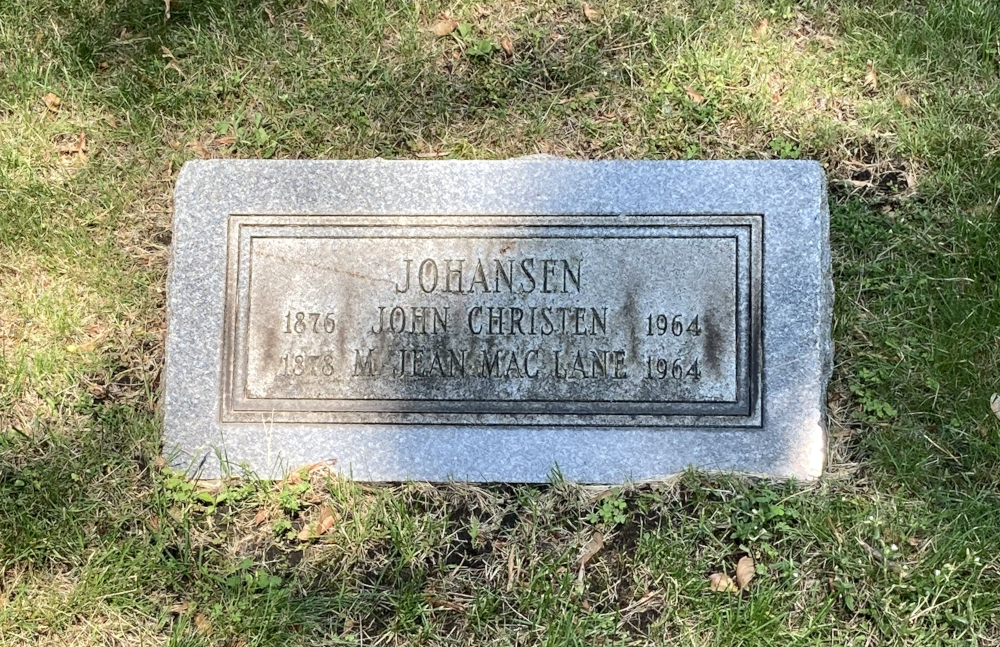
Johansen's grave at Oak Woods Cemetery

At the conclusion of World War I, Johansen was commissioned by the U.S. government to document the signing of the Treaty of Versailles which today hangs in the National Portrait Gallery, Smithsonian Institution. Other portraits include the original Presidential portrait of President Herbert Hoover, (Note: This portrait was later replaced by the current official White House portrait of Herbert Hoover painted by Elmer Wesley Greene in 1956.) official U.S. Department of Justice portrait of Attorney General Robert H. Jackson (which later became the basis of the official U.S. Supreme Court portrait of Justice Robert H. Jackson), official Vermont State House portrait of Governor Percival Clement, two works in the United States Capitol, and works in the collections of the Dallas Museum of Art, National Gallery, Pennsylvania Academy of the Fine Arts, Metropolitan Museum of Art, the National Academy of Design, the Art Institute of Chicago and the Richmond Art Museum.

He died in New Canaan, Connecticut on 23 May 1964, at the age of 87, and was buried at Oak Woods Cemetery in Chicago.

== Awards ==
- Young Fortnightly prize, Chicago (1903)
- Honorable mention, Arts Club of Chicago (1903)
- Medal of honor, Chicago Society of Artists (1904)
- Bronze medal, Louisiana Purchase Exposition, St. Louis (1904)
- Gold medal, Grand Prix Exposition, Buenos Aires (1910)

== Other sources ==
- Lewis, R.W.B. and Nancy Lewis. American Characters - Selections From The National Portrait Gallery, Accompanied By Literary Portraits. Yale University: 2000. ASIN B000JZVXP2.
- Robbins, Daniel. The Vermont State House: A History and Guide. The Vermont State House Preservation Committee: 1980.
- Voss, Frederick S. Portraits of the Presidents Revised Edition: The National Portrait Gallery. Rizolli: 2007. ISBN 978-0-8478-2887-6.
