= Todros Geller =

American artist (1899–1949)

- Chicago Towers, 1937, woodcut on paper, 10 x 8 in., Collection of the Illinois State Museum. Produced as part of the Works Progress Administration Federal Art Project.
- Born: 1 July 1889; Vinnytsia, Russian Empire
- Died: 23 February 1949 (aged 59); Chicago, Illinois, U.S.
- Education: School of the Art Institute of Chicago
- Occupations: Painting, printmaker
- Notable work: From Land to Land (1937)
- Awards: Three Library of Congress National Print Exhibition awards

Todros Geller (Yiddish: טודרוס געלער; July 1, 1889 – February 23, 1949) was a Jewish American artist and teacher best known as a master printmaker and a leading artist among Chicago's art community.

== Early life and education ==
Geller was born on July 1, 1889, in Vinnytsia, Russian Empire (now Ukraine) in 1889. He studied art in Odessa and continued his studies after moving to Montreal in 1906 where he immigrated to Canada. He married and moved to Chicago in 1918, where he studied at the School of the Art Institute of Chicago until 1923.

== Career ==
Geller produced paintings, woodcuts, woodcarvings, and etchings. His work focused on Jewish tradition, often including moralistic themes and social commentary, shtetl, ghetto life, and the intersection of Jewish tradition with modern-day Chicago. He regarded art as a tool for social reform and he spent a large part of his career teaching art. His work was commissioned for stained glass windows, bookplates, community centers and Yiddish and English books. He was regarded as a leader in the field of synagogue and religious art. He designed stained glass windows for synagogues in Omaha, Fort Worth, Dayton, Stamford, and Chicago Heights. Over the course of his career he illustrated more than 40 books.

=== Teaching art ===
In addition to conducting classes in his studio, Geller was head of art at the Jewish People's Institute (JPI), supervisor of art for the Board of Jewish Education and director of art for the College of Jewish Studies (which became the Spertus Institute for Jewish Learning and Leadership) and taught at Hull House. Many prominent Chicago artists studied drawing and painting under Geller. Geller was a source of inspiration to Aaron Bohrod and Mitchell Siporin, among others. Irean Gordon was also among his pupils.

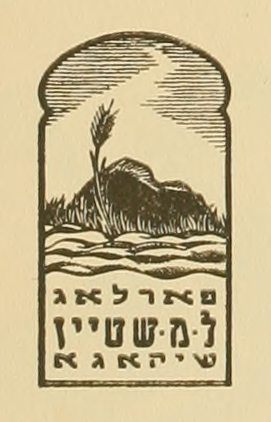
L. M. Shteyn Farlag logo (1937)

=== The L. M. Shteyn Farlag ===
In 1926, Geller formed what would become a lengthy working relationship with Chicago publisher and cultural activist L. M. Shteyn (a pseudonym for Yitshak Leyb Fradkin, anglicized as L.M. Stein in his English language correspondence). Shteyn and Geller shared a similar ideology, were both considered radical progressives, were part of the Chicago Jewish Left who worked to promote the Yiddish language and they both supported the Soviet Union for its commitment to the Yiddish language and to the Jewish settlement in Birobidzhan. Shteyn's Yiddish press, the L. M. Shteyn Farlag, published at least eight monographs illustrated by Geller and four art albums dedicated to his work.

=== Art and activism ===
In 1923, the Chicago Hebrew Institute's Observer (a forerunner of today's Jewish Community Center's), included Geller as one of the "many well known artists" to have their works listed in an art exhibit catalogue.

Geller was one of the founding members of "Around the Palette" in Chicago in 1926, a club where artists shared their personal views of art and its role in society. The club became the "American Jewish Art Club", in 1940 and subsequently the "American Jewish Artists Club" in the early 1990s. Other founding members included Emil Armin, David Bekker, Aaron Bohrod, Fritzi Brod, Samuel Greenburg, William S. Schwartz, Maurice Yochim and Louise Dunn Yochim.

In 1929, Geller visited Palestine, where he was inspired to paint Biblical themes such as his painting Jerusalem the Old which was included in the catalogue of the Art Institute of Chicago's thirty-third annual exhibition. He also created a woodcut series entitled Seven Palestinian motifs cut on wood in 1930.

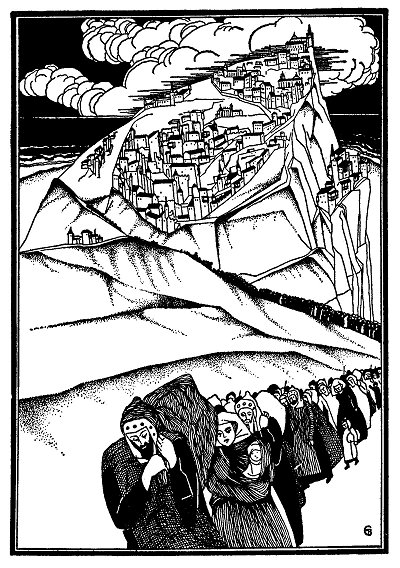
Illustration for Rose G Lurie's children's book, The Great March: Post Biblical Jewish Stories (1931) from the "Whither--now?" story about the expulsion of the Jews from Spain

In 1931, Geller provided illustrations for Rose G Lurie's book, The Great March: Post Biblical Jewish Stories, a selection of Jewish stories for children covering the period from the destruction of the First Temple to the expulsion from Spain. The book was published by the Union of American Hebrew Congregations and was intended to cultivate "a love for Jewish heroes, for the Jewish people, and for Jewish idealism." John Drury, in his 1931 review of the Cafe Royale, "an intellectual and artistic rendezvous of the west side Jewish quarter", for his book Dining in Chicago, included "Todros Geller, the wood-block artist" as one of the "local Jewish celebrities in the arts and allied interests" who dined there.

In 1932, Geller participated in the Grant Park Art Fair organized by Adeline Loebdell Atwater, Chicago's first open-air art fair.

According to Sarah Abrevaya Stein, professor of history and Maurice Amado Chair in Sephardic Studies at UCLA, inexpensive reproductions of Geller's art were popular with Chicago's Jewish Left in the 1930s, particularly a picture of a traditionally dressed Jewish man standing below the tracks of one of Chicago's elevated trains.

Geller regarded art as a tool for social reform. In 1936, he signed the call for the first American Artists' Congress "Against War and Fascism". In the summer of 1936, the Chicago Society of Artists published their first annual block-print calendar called The Artist Calendar – 1937 that featured woodcuts by 30 Chicago artists, including Geller. The calendar project was intended to raise funds for the society activities and expose Chicago artists to a wider audience.

He was the most prominent of the 14 graphic artists who participated in A Gift to Biro-Bidjan in 1937, an album of 14 woodcuts produced as a fund-raising project for the Chicago ICOR (whose acronym comes from the Yiddish name for the Association for Jewish Colonization in the Soviet Union) to support the Jewish Autonomous Oblast. Geller's contribution to the portfolio was a woodcut based on Raisins and Almonds, the Yiddish lullaby written by Abraham Goldfaden in 1880 for his operetta Shulamis. The woodcut shows several scenes as a boy grows up and travels from Eastern Europe to Chicago: the boy's mother and a goat surrounding his cradle, the boy studying, the grown man walking with a sack on his back passing an open market, the man working as a tailor to earn money to immigrate to the New World, and a scene of an elevated train and the smokestacks of Chicago with unemployed workers demonstrating with banners and flags. The last scene, on the theme of new hope, shows the man standing looking up and grasping a newly planted tree. The other artists who contributed woodcuts were Alex Topchevsky, William Jacobs, Aaron Bohrod, David Bekker, Louis Weiner, Mitchell Siporin, Edward Millman, Fritzi Brod, Bernece Berkman, Morris Topchevsky, Abraham Weiner, A. Raymond Katz, and Ceil Rosenberg.

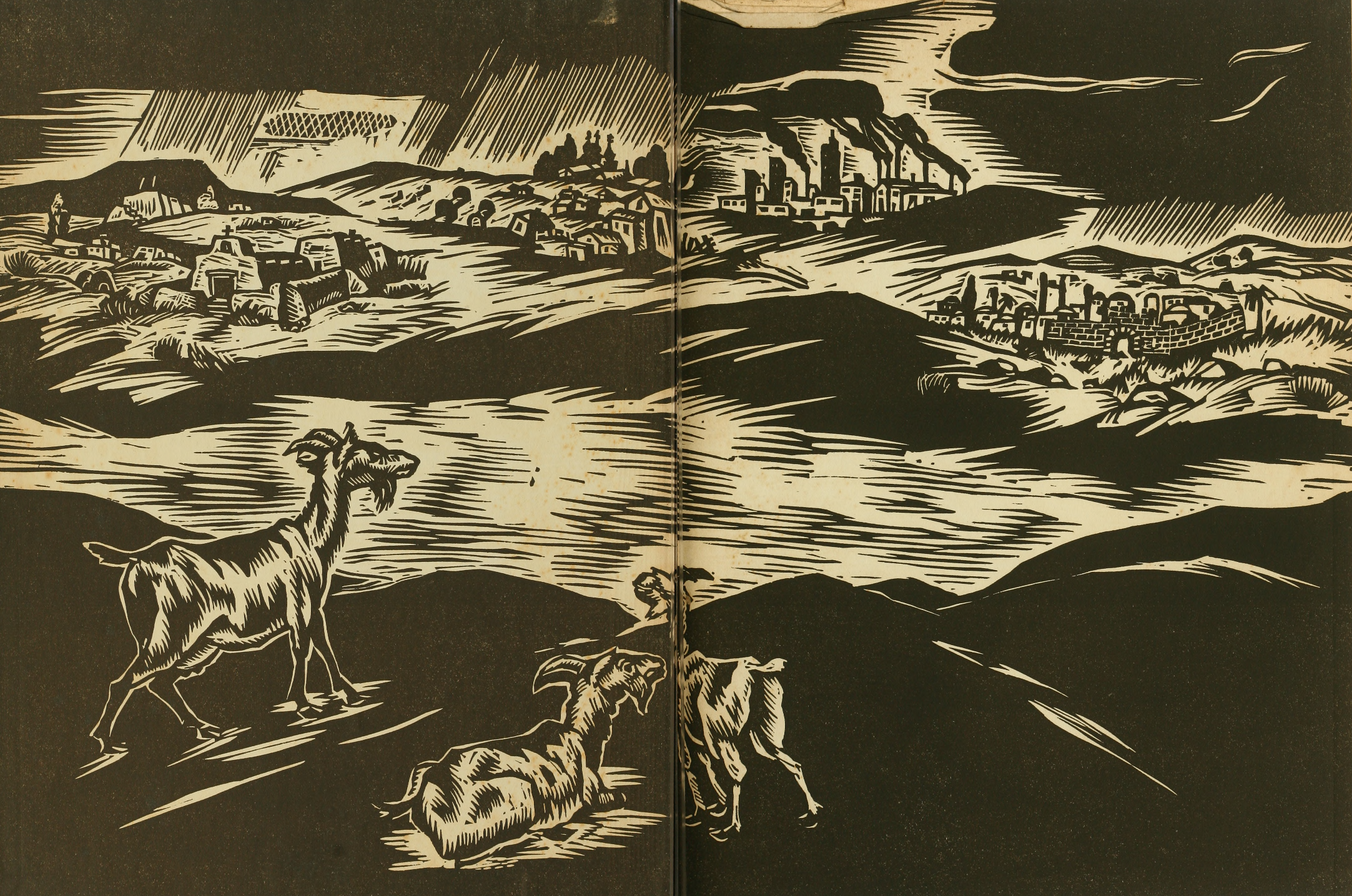
From Land to Land (1937) endpapers

In 1937, Shteyn published a volume of about sixty woodcuts by Geller called From Land to Land, produced as part of the Federal Art Project (FAP), the visual arts arm of the Great Depression-era New Deal Works Progress Administration (WPA) Federal One program in the United States. The cover featured a goat on the shore of Lake Michigan with Chicago's skyline in the background. As an important staple of Jewish life in Eastern Europe that were believed to have mystical qualities, goats were a dominant symbol in Geller's artistic vocabulary. The woodcuts, four of which were in color, illustrated Jewish life, in addition to Native American, Spanish, Mexican, and Midwestern American themes.

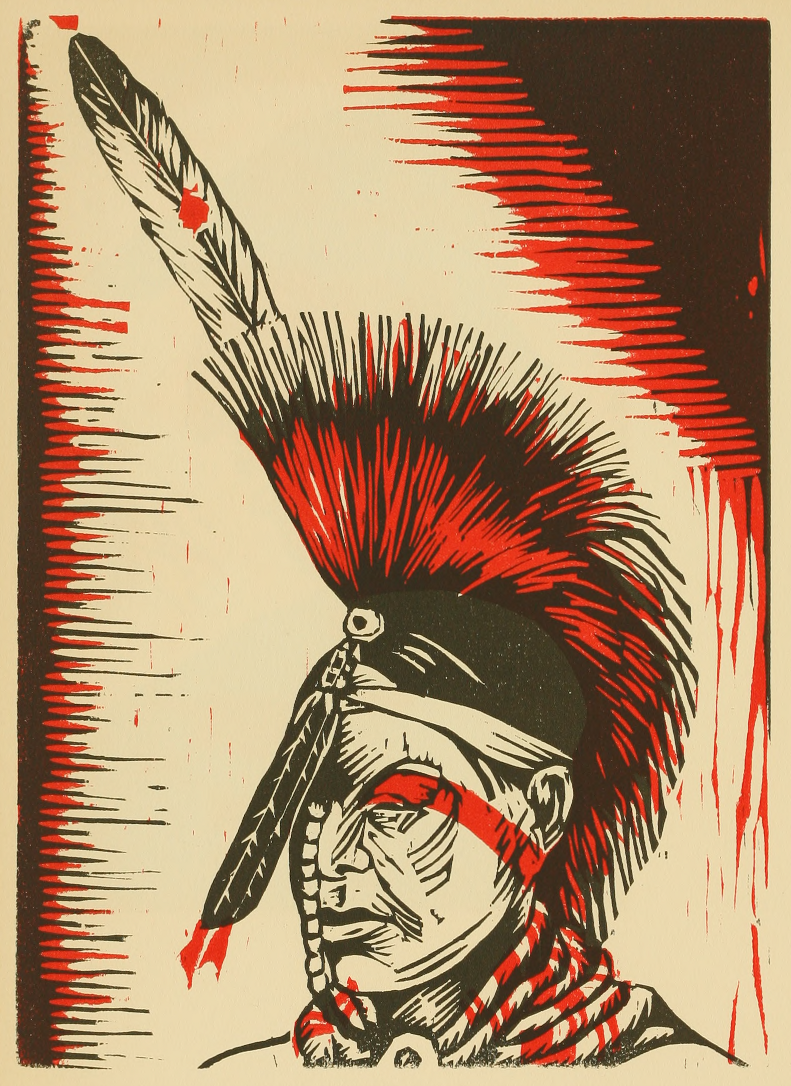
Oklahoma Indian dancer (1936)

In May 1938, the Osage Tribal Museum in Pawhuska, Oklahoma, opened to the public. It was the first tribally owned museum in the United States, and was built with support from a WPA-sponsored program for the preservation of Native American culture. As part of Osage Tribal Councilman John Joseph Mathews' efforts to conserve Osage culture, Mathews obtained a second grant from the Federal Art Project to finance an art project commissioned for the museum's opening that included oil portraits of Osage elders posing in various costumes. Geller, who had spent time in the Southwest studying and painting Native American Indians, supervised the art project and painted around twelve of the portraits. Geller's paintings are displayed at the museum. Geller painted The Accordion Player in 1938 as part of the WPA Federal Art Project, an oil painting in the collection of the MacNider Art Museum in Mason City, Iowa.

Geller provided illustrations for some of the Nebraska Folklore pamphlets, written and compiled by Nebraska's Writers' Project between 1937 and 1940. The pamphlets were produced as part of the "Folklore Project", a WPA Federal Writers’ Project (FWP) supported effort to document the life histories of people from different backgrounds and geographic regions.

The WPA supported South Side Community Art Center opened in 1940 providing free art lessons for the community. Geller was a member of the interracial faculty of art instructors that included local black artists such as Charles Davis, Charles White, Bernard Goss, William Carter and local white artists such as Morris Topchevsky, Si Gordon and Max Kahn.

Geller became the first president of the American Jewish Arts Club following its formation in Chicago in 1940.

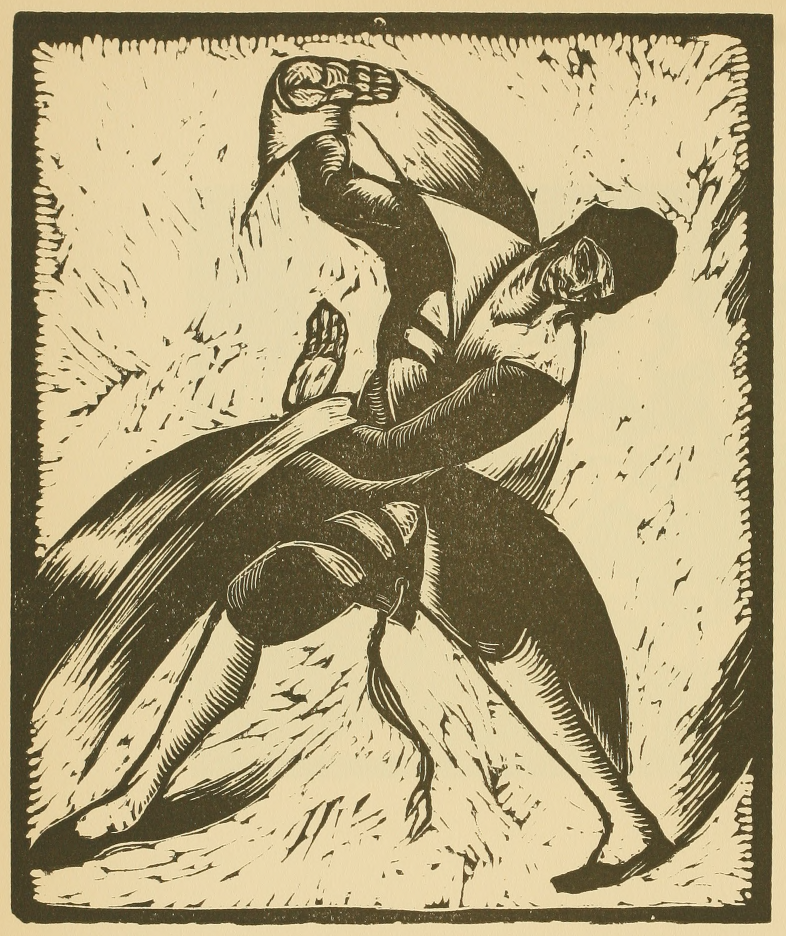
Hassidic (1927)

In 1942, Geller provided woodcut-illustrations for Jewish dancing master Nathan Vizonsky's book Ten Jewish Folk Dances: A Manual for Teachers and Leaders published by the American-Hebrew Theatrical League in Chicago. The book, possibly the first English-language book to document the dances characteristic of the Jews of Eastern Europe, contains explanations of the purpose of various dances including folkloric information, step-by-step dance descriptions, detailed notes on the costumes to be used and music scores arranged by Max Janowski.

== Awards ==
Geller's woodcuts won three Library of Congress National Print Exhibition awards.

== Death and legacy ==
Geller died in Chicago, on 23 February 1949, aged 59. He was survived by his wife Olga Geller, his daughter Esther Silverman and his sister. The Jewish Education Building in Chicago held a memorial exhibit for him shortly after his death.

== Spertus Institute archive ==
The Spertus Institute for Jewish Learning and Leadership in Chicago has a collection of papers documenting Geller's career. The archive includes photographs, sketchbooks, original artwork, commissions for stained glass windows, various manuscript material including typescripts of articles, papers relating to the American Artists' Congress, 1937–1938, and correspondence with art organizations and artists such as A. Raymond Katz, Beatrice Levy, Archibald Motley, Increase Robinson, and Carl Zigrosser. The papers cover his efforts to establish a Jewish museum in Chicago in 1928, involvement with the WPA Federal Art Project, participation in Artists Equity and the American Federation of Arts, his work teaching art to the Jewish community and his efforts to improve the working conditions and visibility of Jewish artists.

The Spertus Institute also holds a number of Geller's oil paintings including Landscape with Figure (1924), Portrait of a Man (1929), Crossroads (ca. 1930), Vase of Flowers (1931), Mexican Village (1935), Portrait of an Artist, Portrait of Ben Shalom, Jerusalem Courtyard, Mitzi, Church Landscape, Portrait of a Woman and two paintings, Tenant Scene (undated) and Park Scene (1946), painted on the same board support in a double-sided format. The Spertus collection also includes a number of Geller's woodcut prints.

In March 2011, Susan Weininger, professor emerita of Art History at Roosevelt University gave a lecture titled "The Dean of Chicago Jewish Artists: Todros Geller & the Chicago Context" at North Shore Synagogue Beth El, Highland Park, Illinois, in conjunction with an exhibit of Geller's woodcut prints.

== Books illustrated by Geller ==
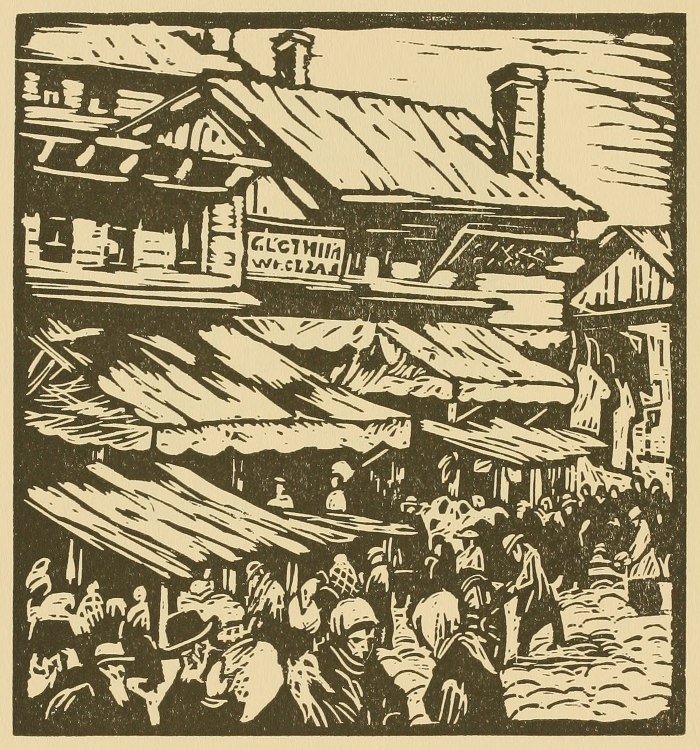
Chicago's Maxwell Street used as an illustration in Louis Wirth's The Ghetto

- Heller, Selig (1926). Alte Vegn (in Yiddish). L. M. Shteyn.
- Hershfield, Bessie (1926). Kareln (Beads) (in Yiddish). Jewish Women's Art Club. L. M. Shteyn.
- Mattes, Lunuansky Lune (1926). Momentn (in Yiddish). Byalistakker yugnt farband.
- Wirth, Louis (1928). The Ghetto. University of Chicago Press.
- Lurie, Rose G.; Geller, Todros (1931). The Great March: Post Biblical Jewish Stories. Union of American Hebrew Congregations.
- Korman, Ezra (1932). Shekiah: Lider fun Elter un Toyt. L.M. Stein Farlag.
- Geller, Todros (1937). Fun Land tsu Land (From Land to Land) (in Yiddish). L. M. Shteyn/Labor World Press.
- Vizonsky, Nathan (1942). Ten Jewish Folk Dances: A Manual for Teachers and Leaders. American-Hebrew Theatrical League.
- Rosenblatt, Henry (1944). Mayn Likhtike Nesiah (My Lonesome Journey) (in Yiddish). L. M. Shteyn.
- Rosenzweig, Efraim Michael; Geller, Todros (1946). Had Gadya. Lino pictures by Todros Geller (in Yiddish). L. M. Stein.
