= Irean Gordon =

American painter

Irean Ethel Gordon (February 17, 1912 – May 9, 1982) was an American painter.

Gordon was a native of Chicago, the eldest of four children born to Joseph, a tailor, and Kitty Mulis, a homemaker. For a time in early childhood her family lived in Tucson, returning to the Chicago area when she was a teenager. In 1929 she graduated from Roosevelt High School, continuing her education at the School of the Art Institute of Chicago and under Todros Geller. In 1935 she married musician Leo Gordon, with whom she had two sons. She played piano and performed in community theater in addition to creating art. Gordon was a modernist who worked in oil, watercolor, and ink, and crafted sculpture as well. She worked for the Works Progress Administration and exhibited at the Art Institute of Chicago. Into her later years she continued to teach art to children at home. She died in Valparaiso, Indiana of cancer in 1982.

Two of Gordon's paintings, the oil-on-canvas Rural Scene and the watercolor Across the Bridge, both dating to the 1940s, are owned by the Illinois State Museum.
