= C. Bertram Hartman =

American painter

C. Bertram Hartman (1882–1960) was an American oil and watercolor painter. His paintings are exhibited in museums in the United States.

== Early life ==
C. Bertram Hartman was born in Junction City, Kansas in 1882. He studied at the Art Institute of Chicago and the Academy of Fine Arts, Munich. He also studied art in Paris.

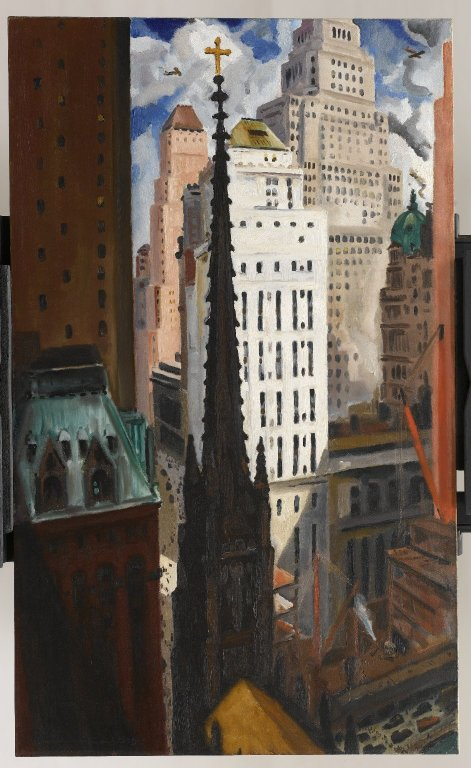
Trinity Church and Wall Street by Hartman, 1929, held at the Brooklyn Museum.

== Career ==
Hartman painted the Canyon de Chelly in Arizona in 1916–1917. He did oil and watercolor paintings. He also did "batik textiles, book illustrations, stained glass, mosaics, and designs for rugs".

His artwork is exhibited at the Hubbell Trading Post, the Butler Institute of American Art, the Spencer Museum of Art on the campus of the University of Kansas, and the Brooklyn Museum in New York City.

Hartman was a member of the Chicago Society of Artists, the American Watercolor Society and the Mural Painters of America.

In 1933/1934 Hartman was represented by two works in the First Biennial Exhibition of Contemporary American Sculpture, Watercolors and Prints, held at the Whitney Museum at 10 west 8th St. His address: 11 MacDougal Alley, located on the other side of 20 West 8th Street where his friend Gaston Lachaise had a studio from Nov. 1924-1926/27.

== Personal life and death ==
Hartman and his wife Augusta (1885-1960), known as Gusta, resided in New York City and had a number of artist friends. They were very close with the Lachaises, to whom they introduced Dorothy Norman. Gaston Lachaise sculpted a portrait of Gusta known as "The Girl with Bobbed Hair" 1923. Casts can be seen at the Baltimore Museum of Art, the Toledo Museum of Art, and the Williams College Museum of Art. Bertram wrote numerous letters to Isabel Lachaise, which are held by the Beinecke Library at Yale University. Bertram died in New York in 1960.
