= M. Jean McLane =

American portrait painter (1878–1964)

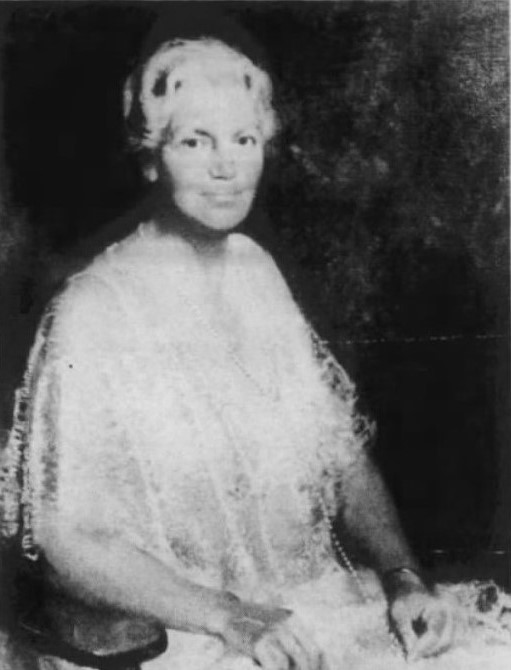
- McLane in 1939
- Born: Myrtle Jean McLane; September 14, 1878; Chicago, Illinois
- Died: January 23, 1964 (aged 85); Stamford, Connecticut
- Education: School of the Art Institute of Chicago and other places in the U.S. and Europe
- Known for: Portraits
- Spouse: John Christen Johansen
- Children: Margaret, John

M. Jean McLane (also known as Jean Johansen) (September 14, 1878 – January 23, 1964), was an American portraitist. Her works were exhibited and won awards in the United States and in Europe. She made portrait paintings of women and children. McLane also made portrait paintings of a Greek and Australian Premiers and Elisabeth, Queen of the Belgians.

== Personal life ==
Myrtle Jean McLane was born in Chicago, Illinois on September 14, 1878.

While a student at the School of the Art Institute of Chicago she met John Christen Johansen and later became his wife. She then had a studio and lived in New York. They had a son John and daughter Margaret. The family spent their summers at Weyborne Hill in Stockbridge, Massachusetts and sometimes traveled to Europe. Their winters were spent in Greenwich Village.

She died in Stamford, Connecticut; Her residence at the time was in New Canaan, Connecticut.

== Education ==
She first studied with John Vanderpoel at the School of the Art Institute of Chicago and later in Cincinnati under Frank Duveneck and in New York City under William M. Chase.

McLane also studied in Italy, Spain and France.

== Career ==
Johansen and McLane helped to found the National Association of Portrait Painters in 1912. Asked by a group of philanthropists to help depict the Allied Leaders from World War I she provided the only female subject, Queen Elisabeth of the Belgians, This painting today is exhibited in the National Museum of American Art.

In 1912, she was elected an associate to the National Academy of Design and a full academician in 1926. She was a member of the National Society of Portrait Painters.

Her Portraits, Brother and Sister was awarded the 1913 Third Hallgarten Prize at the National Academy of Design. Another sibling double portrait, Virginia and Stanton, won the 1914 Lippincott Prize at the Pennsylvania Academy of the Fine Arts as the best figurative piece by an American artist in oil. Her painting "Portrait Mrs. Edmund D. Libby" was included in the Fourth Annual Exhibition of Selected Paintings by American Artists and "The Baby" was included in the Fifth Annual Exhibition of Selected Paintings by American Artists held at the Detroit Museum of Art April 16 to May 31, 1919.

She made portraits of Elisabeth, Queen of the Belgians, Premier Hughes of Australia, and Premier Eleftherios Venizelos. She and her husband were among artists who were commissioned by the National Portrait Gallery committee to create portraits of World War I soldiers and statesmen. Another woman artist was Cecilia Beaux. The exhibition of 20 portraits, including Johansen's Signing the Peace Treaty, June 28, 1919, circulated among American cities.

Her works are in the collections of the Metropolitan Museum of Art and the Smithsonian American Art Museum. Her work was also part of the painting event in the art competition at the 1932 Summer Olympics.

== Awards ==
She received the following awards:

- 1904 – Bronze medal, St. Louis Universal Exposition
- 1907 – First prize, International League, Paris
- 1907 – Elling Prize, New York Woman's Art Club
- 1908 – First prize, International League, Paris
- 1908 – Burgess Prize, New York Woman's Art Club
- 1910 – Silver medal, International Exposition, Buenos Aires
- 1912 – Julia A. Shaw Prize, National Academy of Design
- 1913 – Third Hallgarten Prize, National Academy of Design
- 1914 – Walter Lippincott Prize, Pennsylvania Academy of the Fine Arts

== Works ==
Some of McLane's works are:

- Autumn breeze, by 1911
- Autumnae
- Boy with kite, by 1911
- Brother and sister, 1913
- Elizabeth Buehrmann, 1900s–1910s, Metropolitan Museum of Art
- Girl in Gray, Art Museum of Toledo
- Girl in Green, 1912
- Johansen Girl, 1930
- Italian mother and babe, by 1911
- Italian nurse and child, by 1911
- Laughing mother and babe, by 1911
- Margaret and Her Brother, 1917
- Markle Children
- Master Haussenier, Jr, 1913
- Morning, 1925
- Mother and babe, autumn, by 1911
- Mother and babe, springtime, by 1911
- Mr. Johansen, 1926
- Mrs. Fanny E. Davies, 1934
- Mrs. Henry Hammond and daughter, 1912
- Mrs. Mackey, 1912
- Mrs. Tracy Voughts
- Mrs. Walbridge
- On a Hill Top, 1908
- Portrait of Baby Gilbert Barton, by 1911
- Portrait of Baby Gilbert Barton, by 1911
- Portrait of Baby Margaret Johansen, by 1911
- Portrait of Master Filo H., by 1911
- Portrait of Miss Margaret Rhodes, by 1911
- Portrait of Miss Ruth K., by 1911
- Portrait of Mrs. Enos M. Barton, by 1911
- Portrait of Mrs. Finley D. Cook, by 1911
- Portrait of Mrs. R. G. Arnold and children, by 1911
- Rev. G.A. Studdart Kennedy, 1924
- Sweet peas, by 1911
- Tennis Days, 1932
- The Feathered Hat

== Gallery ==
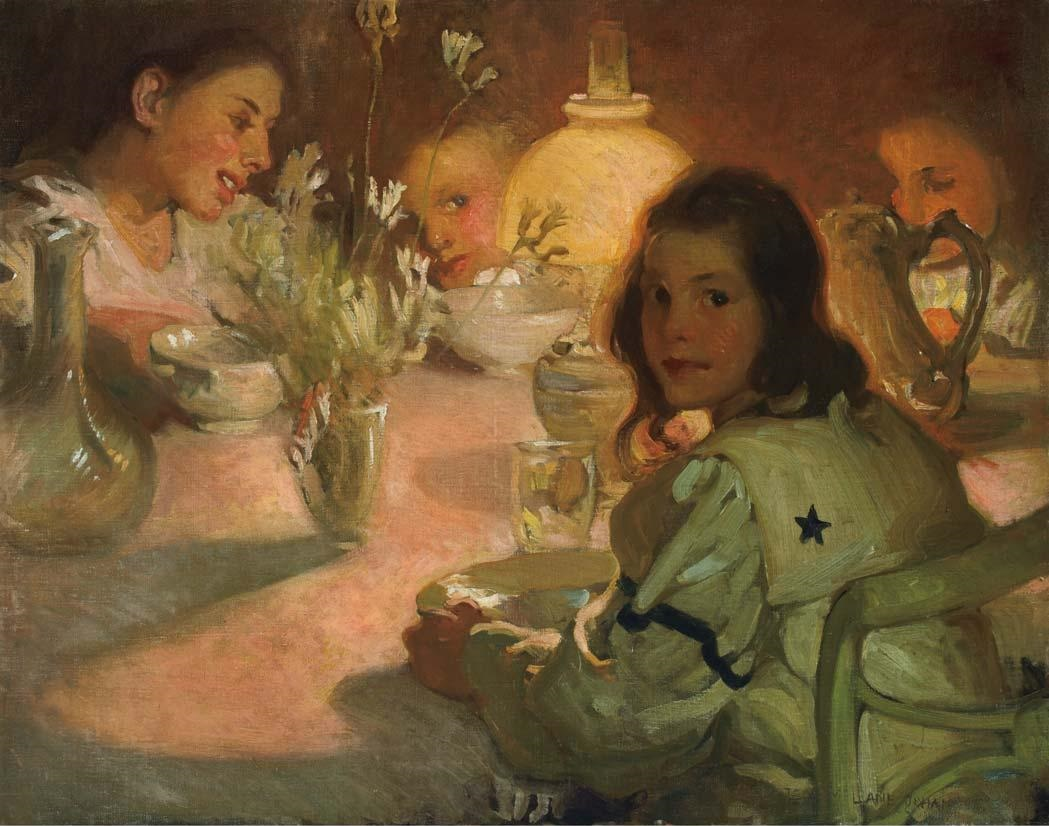
Jean McLane, Tea Time, 1905

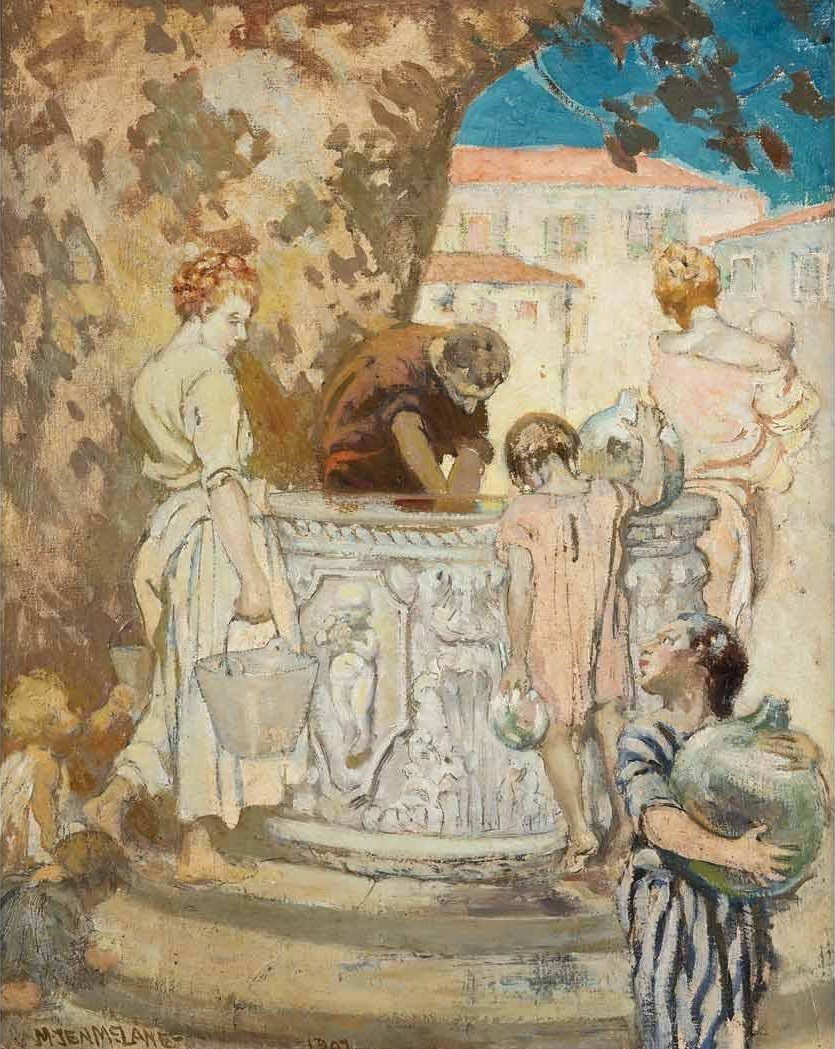
M. Jean McLane, Venetian Well, 1907

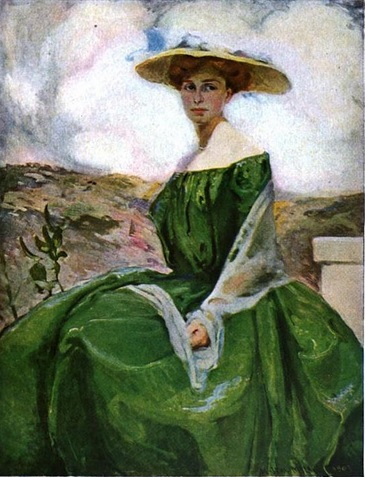
M. Jean McLane, Girl in Green, by 1912

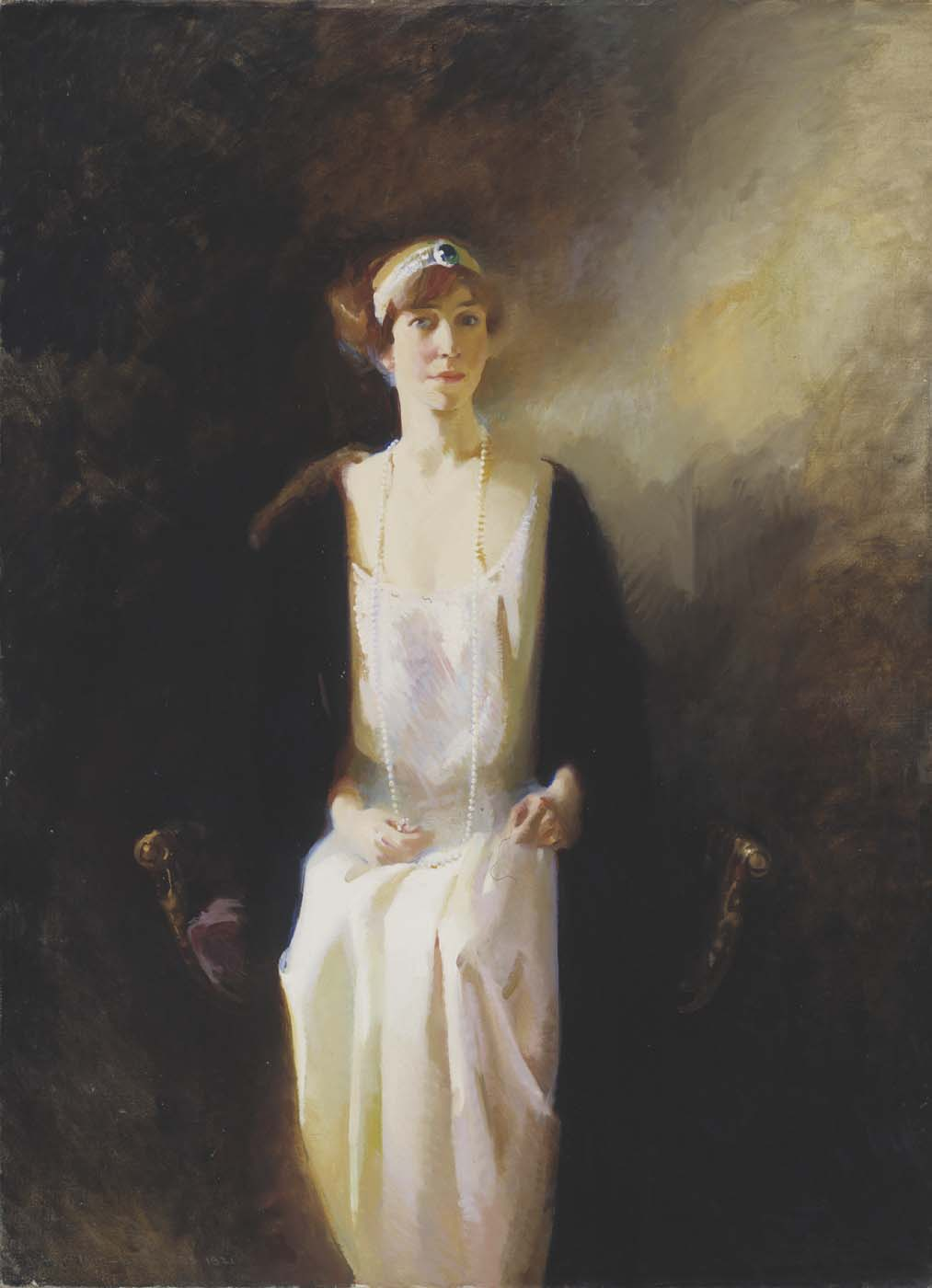
Jean McLane, Elisabeth, Queen of the Belgians, 1921, Smithsonian Institution Art Museum

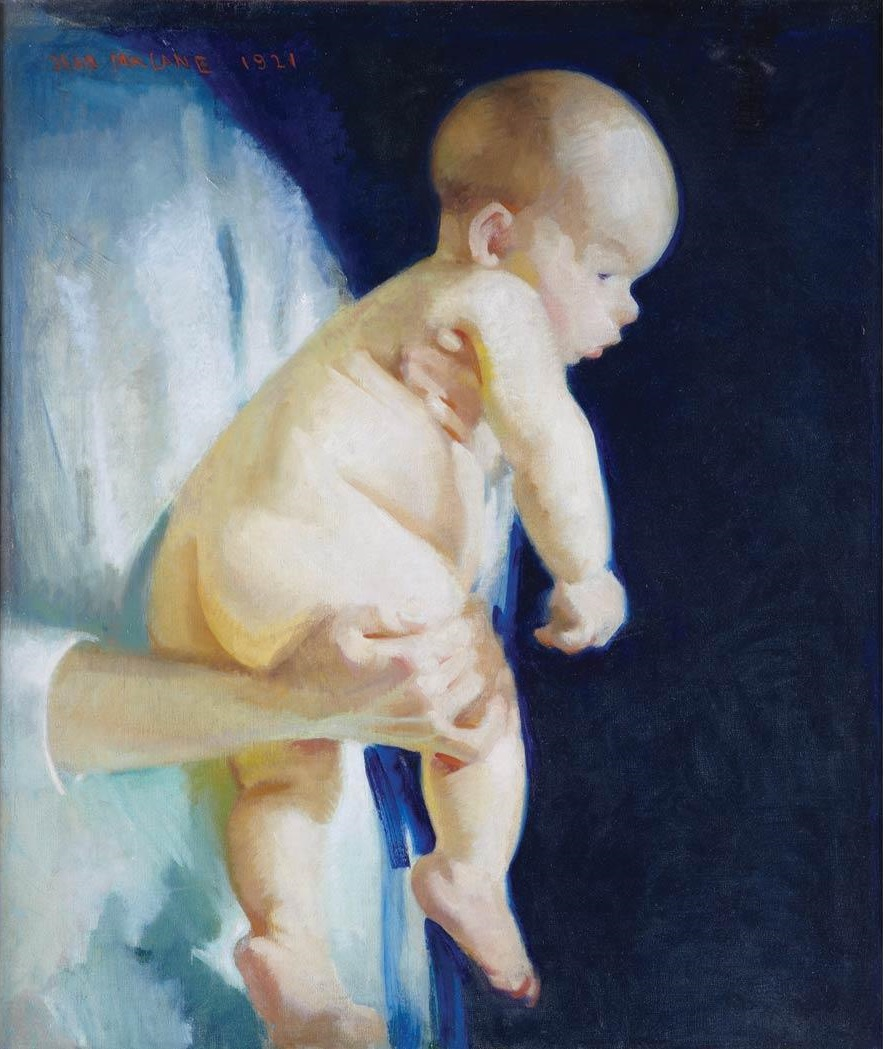
Jean McLane, Heading for Bath, 1921
