= Rudolph Weisenborn =

American artist

- self portrait
- Born: 1881; Chicago, Illinois
- Died: 1974 (aged 92–93); Chicago, Illinois
- Known for: Painter, printmaker, muralist

Rudolph Weisenborn (1881–1974) was an American artist. He painted murals for the Works Progress Administration (WPA) and was a founding member of the American Abstract Artists (AAA).

== Biography ==
Charcoal sketch of Weisenborn by Stanisław Szukalski, 1919

Weisenborn was born in 1881 in Chicago, Illinois. He attended art school in Denver, Colorado where his teachers included Jean Mannheim. In 1913 he returned to Chicago. In 1922 he married Alfreda Gordon (1900-1968).

Weisenborn was active in the Chicago art scene. He was a member of several art groups including the Palette and Chisel Club, the American Artists' Congress, the Cor Ardens, the Chicago No-Jury Society of Artists, and the Chicago Society of Artists. Weisenborn taught at the Chicago Academy of Fine Arts from 1922 through 1934. He then taught privately until 1964.

In the 1930s Weisenborn produced several murals for the Works Progress Administration (WPA); a 7' X 30' mural entitled Contemporary Chicago at the Nettlehorst Elementary School in Chicago, and a series of murals at Crane Technical High School.

In 1933 his work was exhibited at the Century of Progress International Exposition in Chicago. Weisenborn was a founding member of the American Abstract Artists in 1936.

Weisenborn died in 1974 in Chicago, Illinois.

His papers are in the Archives of American Art at the Smithsonian Institution.

His work is in the National Gallery of Art, and the Union League Club of Chicago (ULCC).
