= Beatrice S. Levy =

American painter

- Born: April 3, 1892; Chicago, Illinois
- Died: July 19, 1974 (aged 82); La Jolla, California

Beatrice Sophia Steinfeld Levy (April 3, 1892 - July 19, 1974) was an American printmaker and painter, draftsman, and instructor.

== Early life and education ==
She was born in Chicago to a German-Jewish emigrant father and a mother from Kentucky and grew up on Chicago's Near South Side. She studied at the Chicago Art Institute after graduating from high school in 1910 with an initial focus on illustration. While there, she was among a small number of students including Stanislaus Szukalski who defended the modernist works on display at the notorious Armory Show at the Art Institute in 1913. Encouraged by her instructors she continued her art education after graduating in 1910 with honorable mention, studying portraiture with Ralph Clarkson in Chicago, painting with Charles Hawthorne in Provincetown, Massachusetts, and fine print methods with Vojtěch Preissig in New York's Art Students League in 1915.

== Career ==
By then, she was already a prolific painter and printmaker, producing striking images with saturated color and abbreviated, semi-realist imagery. One of the earliest members of the Chicago Society of Etchers, her exacting, three-plate color intaglios were first exhibited by the Society in 1914. The same year, one of her prints received an honorable mention at Panama–Pacific International Exposition in San Francisco.

She held her first solo exhibition in 1916 at Goupil & Cie Gallery in New York, featured her entire collection of color aquatints. She had a studio in Chicago's 57th Street Art Colony.

In the 1920s she helped form an "art for art's sake" group called the Cor Ardens along with Szukalski, Carl Hoeckner, Ramon Shiva, and Gerrit V. Sinclair. Traveling with friends all over the United States, Europe, and Mexico, she was by then well-known for "forceful painting in oils, but also for her ability to express in the exquisite art of the copper plate … an individual style through a simple and dignified treatment of her subject matter." (Palos Journal, May 1929)

During the Great Depression (1929-39), Levy supervised the Easel Painting Division and Art Gallery of the Illinois Art Project of the WPA. She also supervised the Easel Painting Division for the Federal Arts Project a decade later.

For two years during World War II, Levy worked as a meteorological map draftsman and her subsequent work developed along more modern lines.

She traveled extensively in the US, Europe, and North Africa and summered La Jolla, California for several years before making it her home in 1950. She served on the board of the San Diego Museum of Art (then the San Diego Fine Arts Gallery) and taught at the La Jolla Museum School of Arts and Crafts (1961–62). Also at the time, she began a close relationship with the modernist artist Dorothy Stratton King, a La Jolla resident with whom she shared a passion for rich color and strong form.

Levy experimented heavily in her final decade in linear and highly abstract printmaking and enamels.

Levy never married. After a long and distinguished career, she died in La Jolla in 1974. Her papers are held by the Archives of American Art at the Smithsonian Institution in Washington, DC.

== Leadership positions ==
Chicago Society of Artists, president and board member
Chicago Society of Etchers, vice president and board member
Renaissance Society at the University of Chicago, board member
Arts Club of Chicago, vice president and member
Works Progress Administration Art Project Gallery, supervisor
Easel Painting Division for the Federal Art Project, supervisor
San Diego Museum of Art (then the San Diego Fine Arts Gallery), board member
Enamel professor, Art Center of La Jolla

== Solo exhibitions ==
1916 Goupil & Cie Gallery, New York
1923 Milwaukee Art Institute, Wisconsin
1924 Philadelphia Print Club, Pennsylvania
1924 Art Club, Washington, DC
1924 Godspeed's Gallery, Boston, Massachusetts
1924 Grand Rapids Art Gallery, Grand Rapids, Michigan
1926 Library of Congress, Washington, DC
1929 Carnegie Institute, Museum of Art, Pittsburgh, PA
1931 Art Institute of Chicago, Illinois
1932 Smithsonian Institution, Washington, DC
1933–34 Century of Progress, Chicago Art Institute, Illinois
1934 John H Vanderpoel Gallery, Chicago, Illinois
1948 Grinnel College, Iowa
1955 La Jolla Art Center, San Diego, California
1957 Jonson Gallery, University New Mexico
1960 Long Beach Museum, California

== Awards ==
Pan Pacific Exposition, San Francisco, honorable mention (etching), 1915
Robert Rice Jenkins Prize for Painting, Art Institute of Chicago, 1923
Chicago Society of Artists Exhibition, gold medal, 1928
International Exhibition of Prints, Art Institute of Chicago, etcher's prize, 1930
American Artists, Art Institute of Chicago, honorable mention, 1930
Illinois State Exhibition, purchase prize
Coronado Artists Association, first prize, 1952, 1956, 1957
Del Mar County Fair Art Show, first prize, 1953
San Diego Fine Arts Guild, honorable mention, 1955 and 1957
La Jolla Art Center, print award, 1957

== Permanent collections ==
Art Institute of Chicago
Bibliotéque National, Paris
Chicago Municipal College
Davenport Municipal Art Gallery
La Jolla Museum of Art
Fine Arts Gallery of San Diego
Long Beach Museum of Art
Los Angeles County Museum of Art
Mobile Museum of Art, Alabama
National Gallery of Art, Washington D.C.
Portland Art Museum, Oregon Smithsonian Institution
Spencer Museum of Art, University of Kansas
University of New Mexico
US Library of Congress
Vanderpoel College
