= Chicago No-Jury Society of Artists =

Chicago artists association

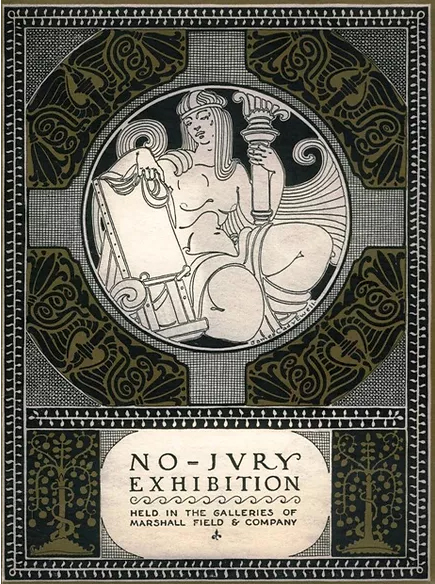
- First annual exhibition of the Chicago No-Jury Society of Artists, 1922 catalogue
- Established: 1922
- Founded at: Chicago, Illinois
- Dissolved: 1958
- Headquarters: Chicago, Illinois
- Official language: English

Chicago No-Jury Society of Artists or No-Jury Society was a Chicago artists association known for sponsoring art exhibits where anyone could exhibit art after paying a small fee per artwork. In 1922 the fee was $4.00.

The No-Jury Society was founded in 1922 by The founders were Carl Hoeckner, Raymond Jonson and Rudolph Weisenborn. The group was inspired by the 1913 Armory Show in Chicago (the traveling exhibition after New York City exhibition) to bring modern art to exhibition space without the artists submitting to a selection process of the conservative artistic juries of Chicago. The group held the first exhibition at the Marshall Field & Co. department store in downtown Chicago.

The group continued to sponsor shows through the 1920s and into the 1930s and 1940s. Some years no show was mounted, and for a time the show was biennale. The Illinois Historical Art Project postulates that the 1958 exhibition was the last for the group, as that is the latest year for which there is catalogue.
