= Chicago Society of Artists =

US non-profit organization

The Chicago Society of Artists is a non-profit organization. The "CSA is the oldest continuing association of artists in the United States. Since its inception and incorporation in 1889, the Chicago Society of Artists has had two primary objectives – the advancement of art in the Chicago area and cultivation of the production and display of member art works".

== Notable members ==
- Gertrude Abercrombie
- Frances Badger
- Belle Baranceanu
- Orval Caldwell
- Gustaf Dalstrom
- Ruth VanSickle Ford
- Todros Geller
- C. Bertram Hartman
- Natalie Smith Henry
- John Christen Johansen
- Edwin Boyd Johnson
- Paul Klein
- Joseph Kleitsch
- Beatrice S. Levy
- LeRoy Neiman
- Edgar Alwin Payne
- Leo Segedin
- John Vanderpoel
- James F. Walker
- Frances Farrand Dodge
