= Susan Thomases =

American lawyer

Susan P. Thomases (born 1944) is a New York-based attorney. She served as personal counsel and an informal adviser to Hillary Clinton during the presidency of Bill Clinton. She was a prominent witness during the Senate Whitewater Hearings in 1995. She served as the model for the character Lucille Kaufmann from the 1996 political novel Primary Colors.

== Biography ==
=== Education and family life ===
Thomases grew up in Englewood, New Jersey. She earned a B.A. from Connecticut College in three years, her M.A. in European Intellectual History from Columbia University, and her J.D. from Columbia Law School.

=== Political career ===
==== Early activities (1968-1978) ====
In 1968, at the prompting of her former boyfriend, Harold M. Ickes, Thomases supported Minnesota Senator Eugene McCarthy's unsuccessful bid to become the Democratic Party's candidate for president.

She met Bill Clinton in 1970, and joined him in 1974 in Fayetteville, Arkansas, to work on his campaign to challenge incumbent Republican congressman John Paul Hammerschmidt. It was here that she met Hillary Rodham, who had just moved to Arkansas after having graduated from Yale Law School the previous year. Rodham had been dating Clinton since 1971. Hammerschmidt was reelected, but Rodham and Thomases became close friends.

In 1976, Thomases got a job in the Carter Administration as an aide to Vice President Mondale. In 1978, she ran former basketball star Bill Bradley's successful campaign to unseat New Jersey Senator Clifford P. Case.

==== 1992 Clinton campaign ====
Thomases joined Harold Ickes as early advisers to Bill Clinton's 1992 presidential campaign. She was eventually named as the campaign's chief scheduler. Hillary Clinton retained Thomases as her lawyer so that their discussions would be protected by attorney–client privilege.

In early 1992, Hillary Clinton sent Thomases to be interviewed by New York Times investigative reporter Jeff Gerth about the Clintons' dealings with the Whitewater Development Corporation (WDC). Thomases worked with Rose Law Firm attorneys Vince Foster and Webster Hubbell to review the firm's records regarding WDC and Madison Guaranty and provide documentation to the Times.

==== Clinton Administration transition ====
Once Bill Clinton was elected, Thomases did not take an official role at the White House, but she continued to advise the First Lady in an unofficial capacity. Thomases helped to arrange an office for Hillary Clinton in the West Wing of the White House. This marked the first time that a First Lady had taken an office in the West Wing; First Ladies traditionally operated out of the East Wing. Thomases was granted a pass to enter the Executive Residence and became known among Hillary's staff as the "Midnight Caller".

Thomases suggested the name of her friend, Zoe Baird, for U.S. Attorney General. Confirmation hearings for Baird faltered when the story emerged that Baird had hired undocumented workers as domestic help.

==== Senate Whitewater Hearings ====
In May 1995, the United States Senate, which had come under Republican control after the 1994 midterm elections, convened the Special Committee to Investigate Whitewater Development Corporation and Related Matters, under the chairmanship of Senator Alfonse D'Amato.

Thomases was questioned by Senators D'Amato and Faircloth and majority counsel, Michael Chertoff, about telephone calls that she had exchanged with Hillary Clinton, Hillary's chief of staff Maggie Williams and White House counsel Bernard Nussbaum the morning after the suicide of Vince Foster. After the telephone calls, Nussbaum had removed documents from Vince Foster's offices before they were searched by the FBI. Thomases testified that the calls were of a personal nature and that she had not discussed the impending search of Foster's office with Hillary Clinton.

In June 1996, the committee published its report, describing Thomases, Williams, Nussbaum and Hubbell as "not candid" and concluding that they had "provided inaccurate and incomplete testimony to the committee in order to conceal Mrs. Clinton's pivotal role in the decisions surrounding the handling of Mr. Foster's documents following his death." Thomases had answered "I don't recall" 184 times during the course of the hearings. Independent counsel Kenneth Starr rejected the committee's criminal referral against Thomases for possible perjury.

== Personal life ==
Thomases has suffered from multiple sclerosis which compelled her to retire. She married William Bettridge, a construction engineer, with whom she had one son. Bettridge died January 5, 2004.

== Additional sources ==
- Clines, Francis X. (August 9, 1995). "Capitol Sketchbook: Whitewater Lion or Lamb? At Hearing, It's All in Eye of Beholder". The New York Times.
