= William H. Kennedy III =

American lawyer from Arkansas

William H. Kennedy III is an American lawyer from Arkansas, who served as Associate White House Counsel during the Clinton administration.

== Law career ==
He served as a senior partner in the Rose Law Firm of Little Rock, Arkansas, with Hillary Clinton, where he focused on commercial, corporate, real estate, and banking law.

== Clinton administration ==
From 1993 until 1995, he served as Associate Counsel to President Bill Clinton before returning to Little Rock. Two other Rose Law Firm partners, Vince Foster and Webb Hubbell, also joined the Clinton administration, but Kennedy was the only one to return to Little Rock without a scandal.

On May 13, 1993, Kennedy met with agents of the US Federal Bureau of Investigation (FBI) at the White House, where he asked them to investigate Billy Dale, who had been fired from the White House travel office staff. The agents hesitated investigating Dale, saying that there was insufficient evidence to justify an investigation, but they agreed to investigate after Kennedy told them that he would turn to the US Internal Revenue Service (IRS) for help if they didn't investigate. Republican Party opponents of the Clintons alleged that Kennedy pressured the agents. A White House internal review criticized Kennedy's actions.

On July 20, 1993, Kennedy and Craig Livingstone went to the Fairfax Hospital where he positively identified the body of Vince Foster, his friend and White House Counsel who had committed suicide.

In March 1994, it was revealed that Kennedy had failed to pay Social Security taxes for his nanny. Clinton's chief of staff Mack McLarty and White House Counsel Lloyd Cutler relieved Kennedy of some of his duties as Associate White House Counsel including reviewing tax-compliance matters or security clearances.

In December 1995, the US Senate Special Whitewater Committee, which was investigating Bill Clinton and Madison Guaranty, subpoenaed notes taken by Kennedy during a meeting at Williams & Connolly on November 5, 1993 with David E. Kendall, Bernard Nussbaum, Bruce Lindsey, and other lawyers for Clinton. Kennedy asserted attorney–client privilege as a reason not to hand over the notes. However the White House eventually handed over the notes sought by the Senate.

In 1996 Judicial Watch filed a lawsuit on behalf former members of the Bush administration and Reagan administration against Kennedy, Craig Livingstone, and Anthony Marceca alleging that they read their personal white house files. However the suit was dismissed.

== Post political career ==
After leaving Washington, Kennedy returned to Little Rock and was again employed by the Rose Law Firm.

In 2001 Kennedy represented Charles Wilfred Morgan, who received a federal pardon from President Clinton after having been convicted of conspiracy to distribute cocaine in the 1980s.

In 2001 President Clinton appointed Kennedy to the board of directors of the Student Loan Marketing Association, commonly known as Sallie Mae. Kennedy was a member of the Dean's Executive Advisory Board and the Arkansas Executive forum of the University of Arkansas Walton College of Business Administration. He was voted Attorney of the Year by VOCALS, a pro bono legal services organization in Arkansas. He was also president of the Downtown Kiwanis Club of Little Rock.

== Family ==
His father, William H. Kennedy Jr. (1917–1991), a former World War II Marine Corps officer and aide to President Franklin D. Roosevelt, was the first Arkansan to become president of the American Bankers Association in 1981.

Kennedy was married to Leslie Gail until late 1994.
