= Castle Grande =

Real estate development in Arkansas, US

Castle Grande was a real estate development in Arkansas about 10 miles south of Little Rock. It came into National news as a result of the Whitewater investigations. The project was a 1,050-acre (4.2 km^{2}) lot where Jim McDougal hoped to build a microbrewery, shopping center, a trailer park and other future projects in 1985. The land was scrub pine forest that had failed already as an industrial development. The sales price was $1.75 million. State regulations prohibited Jim McDougal from investing more than 6% of his Madison Guaranty S&L assets. So, he put in $600,000 of Madison money and then for the difference had Seth Ward put in the remaining $1.15 million. This money Ward borrowed from Madison Guaranty on non-recourse, no personal obligation to repay. If federal regulators found out, McDougal's S&L could be shut down, since it had already been operating under orders to correct its lending practices.

== Seth Ward ==
Seth Ward, an Arkansas businessman and Webster Hubbell's father-in-law, was hired by Jim McDougal to assist in land acquisition for the Castle Grande project. Hillary Clinton, a partner with the Rose Law Firm, worked with Ward on certain legal details of the project known as Industrial Development Corporation (IDC). Webster Hubbell was also a partner at the Rose Law Firm. The bad loans for the project cost the public $4 million.

== Robert W. Palmer ==
Robert W. Palmer was the land appraiser for one of the Castle Grande loans, he later admitted to conspiring with Jim McDougal and others with Madison Guaranty savings association. The conspiracy was to inflate the estimates used for the loans. Kenneth Starr's investigators found that Palmer inflated estimates used to support loans made to Gov. Jim Guy Tucker of Arkansas.

Mr. Palmer did many appraisals for loans for Madison Guaranty. The larger appraisals was for a $1.05 million loan to Gov. Jim Guy Tucker of Arkansas and an associate to buy a water and sewer system for the Castle Grande project. Later appraisals showed the system to be worth about 1/2 of that loan. Later when the loan went into default it was one of the largest losses to Madison, which collapsed in 1989 at a cost to taxpayers of $68 million.

Palmer pleaded guilty on December 6, 1994 to Federal charges of conspiracy, related to Whitewater. He was sentenced on June 16, 1995, to 3 years probation with the first year home detention and was fined $5,000. He was later pardoned by Bill Clinton in a controversial manner.

== Jim McDougal ==
Starting in 1982 Jim McDougal operated Madison Guaranty Savings and Loan. On April 14, 1997, McDougal was convicted of 18 felony counts of fraud conspiracy charges. The counts had to do with fraudulent loans made by Madison, the S&L which failed in the late 1980s. As his Savings and Loan was Federally insured the bad loans ($68 million) were paid by the taxpayers. Criminal referral on Madison Guaranty fraud loans were given first to U.S. Attorney for the Eastern District of Arkansas, Paula Casey who declined to the seek prosecutions. Casey had been appointed to her post by President Bill Clinton and also had been his student. Federal special prosecutors later obtained convictions of 14 persons in Arkansas of more than 40 crimes. The defendants included the sitting Governor, Jim Guy Tucker, who was forced to resign as well as Jim McDougal, Bill Clinton's partner in Whitewater.

== David Hale ==
Since 1979, David Hale ran the Small Business Investment Corporation (SBIC), Capital Management Services, Inc., that was licensed to provide lending to minorities and the economically disadvantaged.The loans were matched and backed by the Small Business Administration (SBA). David Hale testified that he and Jim McDougal, with future-Governor Jim Guy Tucker, created the scheme that would use Hale's SBIC as a pass-through to generate additional loans from Madison. Dean Paul, a friend and business associate of Hale's, borrowed $825,000 from Madison to buy three properties from David Hale. But Paul never used the money. It went instead to Hale, who used it to recapitalize his SBIC with matching funds from the SBA. Hale then loaned a $150,000 downpayment to Jim Guy Tucker and business partner, R.D. Randolph, who together bought out a portion of Ward's Castle Grande holdings for $1.2 million. Tucker and Randolph borrowed the additional $1.05 million from Madison.

McDougal then loaned his old friend and political mentor, Senator William Fulbright, $700,000 to buy out the bulk of Ward's remaining holdings. The net effect was to remove Ward's non-recourse loan from the Madison books and generate substantial sales profits and commissions for Madison. The transactions were designed to be confusing to keep the regulators from finding Ward's loan and Madison's full investment in Castle Grande. The federal thrift examiners arrived the first week of March, 1986. The Dean Paul loan was completed on February 28.

The loans did not miss the examiners. Jim Clark, the Federal Home Loan Bank Board Examiner-in-Charge at Madison, discovered that Seth Ward was behind the Castle Grande deal. The land was purchased illegally with Madison money. The Castle Grande loan like other loans were "pyramid scheme" intended to enrich institution insiders and bolster the net worth of the S&L. Clark said Madison was one of the 3 worst cases of insider dealing that he did ever seen in his 20 years as an examiner.

== Hillary Clinton ==
Hillary Clinton has said she did not work on the Castle Grande project, when questioned by two separate federal agencies and part of the Hillary Clinton and Whitewater probe "I don't believe I knew anything about any of these real estate parcels and projects. . . . " she said in an RTC interview in May 1995. But later Rose Law Firm billing records were discovered in the book room family quarters of the White House. Clinton said she had no idea how they got there. Billing records showed that she charged Madison for about 30 hours on work with Seth Ward over 4 months in 1985 and 1986. She and her lawyers said it was work with a development called IDC, thus the confusion. IDC was the company that sold the land to Madison. She said the only Castle Grande she knew was Castle Grande Estates the trailer park, for which she did no work.

Hillary Clinton told Barbara Walters on ABC in a Jan. 12, 1996 interview: "Castle Grande was a trailer park on a piece of property that was about a thousand acres big. I never did work for Castle Grande." "And so when I was asked about it last year [by the RTC], I didn't recognize it, I didn't remember it. The billing records show I did not do work for Castle Grande. I did work for something called IDC, which was not related to Castle Grande."

Walters asked." Was that Seth Ward?" Hillary Clinton replied "And Seth Ward was involved in that on behalf . . . " Barbara Walters: "Separate deal?" Hillary Clinton reply: "Separate deal completely."

RTC lawyers interviewed Hillary Clinton in the White House, on Feb. 14, 1996, asked: RTC:" Can you explain to me what you mean by IDC and Castle Grande are, in your mind, a separate deal completely?" Hillary Clinton's reply:

Well, my understanding is that the work for Madison concerned property that was referred to then at the time and continually by the Rose Firm as IDC or Industrial Development Corporation property. I know that work as IDC. That's how it was billed. And I did not know that there was something called Castle Grande, to the best of my recollection, until it came to my attention through these investigations, the entire thousand acres that we referred to as IDC was being called Castle Grande . . . I was informed sometime within the last year or two that there was a trailer park on the IDC property called Castle Grande Estates. To the best of my recollection, that was the first I had ever heard of Castle Grande Estates.

She also claimed that she could not remember her work on the project nor 15 conversations with Hubbell’s father-in-law, Seth Ward.

== Susan McDougal ==
Federal regulators said "The indictment against Susan McDougal details a series of grand jury questions about Hillary Clinton and Castle Grande that Mrs. McDougal refused to answer

During the grand jury McDougal stated her full name "for the record," then refused to answer any additional questions. Her testimony included the response "Get another independent counsel and I'll answer every question.". U.S. District Court Judge Susan Webber Wright sentenced her to prison confinement for civil contempt of court related to McDougal's unwillingness to answer "three questions." One of those questions concerned whether President Bill Clinton lied in his testimony during her Whitewater trial, particularly when he denied any knowledge of an illegal $300,000 loan.

From September 9, 1996 until March 6, 1998, McDougal spent the maximum possible 18 months in prison for civil contempt, including 8 months in solitary confinement. Immediately afterward, on March 7, 1998, she began serving the two-year sentence for her conviction in 1996. Soon after, the Office of Independent Counsel indicted McDougal on criminal contempt-of-court charges, and charged her with obstruction of justice.

After serving four months on the Whitewater fraud conviction, McDougal was released for medical reasons.

After her release, McDougal's embezzlement trial in California began. McDougal was acquitted of all twelve counts of embezzlement later in 1998. A suit in 1999 against Nancy Mehta for malicious prosecution was settled out of court.

McDougal's trial for criminal contempt-of-court and obstruction of justice charges began in March 1999. The jury hung 7-5 in favor of acquittal for contempt of court, and found her not guilty on the charge of obstruction of justice.

McDougal received a full Presidential pardon from outgoing President Bill Clinton in the final hours of his presidency in 2001. (See List of people pardoned by Bill Clinton)

== David Kendall ==
David E. Kendall was Ms. Clinton's personal lawyer. He announced the discovery of the Rose Law Firm billing records and turned them over to the Whitewater independent counsel. He said of the billing records "another of the meaningless mysteries of Whitewater." Alston Jennings was the Little Rock lawyer who represented Seth Ward. He visited the White House talked with Hillary and her lawyer David Kendall about the billing records. As the investigation expanded, Kendall went on to represent Clinton during the 1998–99 impeachment proceedings, and continues to represent the Clintons in miscellaneous civil matters.

== Vincent Foster ==
Vincent Foster was Rose Law Firm partner with Hillary Clinton, he went with her to the Clinton White House as deputy counsel. At the Rose Law Firm he had been a billing partner and worked for on the Madison Bank & Trust accounts with Hillary Clinton. At the White House he was unhappy with work in politics and spiraled into depression, and in July 1993, he was found dead of a gunshot in Fort Marcy Park. Five official governmental investigations ruled his death a suicide, but several conspiracy theories have since emerged.

== Sam Bratton ==
Sam Bratton was an aide to Gov. Bill Clinton. He oversaw state regulatory issues, he was notified by the Arkansas Securities Commissioner, Beverly Bassett Schaffer, that Madison S&L was in trouble with federal securities regulators.
