= L. Jean Lewis =

Laura Jean Lewis (born c. 1954) is a former senior investigator for the Resolution Trust Corporation. She is credited with initiating the Whitewater investigation against President Bill Clinton.

Lewis is a native of Houston, Texas; her father was a major general in the U.S. Army. She has a degree in political science from Sam Houston State College.

Lewis joined the Resolution Trust Corporation office in Kansas City, Missouri as a senior criminal investigator in 1991. Among other assignments she was investigating the failure of Madison Guaranty Savings and Loan, a Little Rock savings and loan company owned by James McDougal, who had been the Clintons' partner in Whitewater, a failed land development project in the Ozark Mountains of northern Arkansas. When the connection between the Clintons and McDougal became a news story, she refocused on the Madison Guaranty case. On September 2, 1992, just prior to the 1992 presidential election, she submitted a criminal referral to the FBI naming Bill Clinton and Hillary Clinton as witnesses in the Madison Guaranty case. U.S. Attorney Charles A. Banks and the FBI determined that the referral lacked merit, but she continued to pursue it. Between 1992 and 1994 she issued several additional referrals against the Clintons and repeatedly called the U.S. Attorney's Office in Little Rock and the Justice Department about the case.

Lewis later appeared before the Senate Whitewater Committee. Before the hearings it was claimed that her testimony could prove to be "more troublesome for Bill Clinton than Paula Jones"; however, her testimony did not provide any sensational or new information, and she eventually fainted under cross examination and had to be helped from the hearing room.

She was later suspected of illegally recording a conversation with a senior government attorney during the investigation. She was herself investigated for various wrongdoings, including misuse and mishandling of classified material, secretly recording conversations with her colleagues, and use of government equipment for personal gain. She later admitted to using her office to market T-shirts and mugs lettered "B.I.T.C.H." (Bubba/Bill, I'm Taking Charge, Hillary).

Lewis was appointed in 2003 as chief of staff of the Pentagon Inspector General's Office in the United States government. On February 26, 2004, she again attracted attention when her office was supposed to look into Halliburton contracts.
