= Robert W. Palmer =

American land appraiser

Robert W. Palmer is a former Madison Guaranty land appraiser. He pleaded guilty to federal conspiracy charges related to Whitewater and was later pardoned by President Bill Clinton.

As a land appraiser he admitted to conspiring with Jim McDougal and others with Madison Guaranty savings association. The case was part of the Whitewater property, which Bill Clinton and Jim McDougal originally purchased in 1978. The conspiracy was to inflate the estimates used for the loans. Kenneth Starr's investigators were also told that Palmer inflated estimates used to support loans made to Gov. Jim Guy Tucker of Arkansas. The false land appraisals made Madison Guaranty's books look better than they were. Mr. Palmer did about 90 percent of the appraisals for Madison and that about 90 percent of those were inflated. Madison records showed one appraisal was for a $1.05 million loan to Tucker and an associate to buy a water and sewer system for real estate development known as Castle Grande. Later appraisals found the system to be worth about 1/2 of the loan, when the loan went into default it was one of the largest losses for Madison.

David Hale, former Arkansas municipal judge and banker, told investigators that a Palmer's appraisal and later loan for Etta's Place restaurant and two other lots for $825,000 from Madison helped shore up his finances. Hale handled federally insured loans in Little Rock for the Small Business Administration. The loan helped him to issue an improper SBA loan to Susan McDougal. Hale said he made the $300,000 loan because of pressure from Gov. Clinton and Jim McDougal. Mr. Clinton denied his claim.

Starting in 1982, McDougal operated Madison Guaranty Savings and Loan. On April 14, 1997, McDougal was convicted of 18 felony counts of fraud conspiracy charges. The counts had to do with bad loans made by Madison, the S&L failed in the late 1980s. As his savings and loan was federally insured the bad loans ($68 million) were at the end paid by the taxpayers.

Palmer pleaded guilty on December 6, 1994, to federal charges of conspiracy.

== Pardon ==
On January 20, 2001, the last day of his presidency, Bill Clinton pardoned Palmer, one of the 140 pardons Clinton issued that day. Federal prosecutor Mary Jo White was appointed to investigate the pardons. She was later replaced by future FBI director, James Comey, who found no wrongdoing on Clinton's part.
