= John Latham (Whitewater) =

CEO of Madison Guaranty

John Latham is a former CEO of Madison Guaranty that came into front page national news due to the Whitewater investigations.

Madison Guaranty was owned and operated by James and Susan McDougal. On February 7, 1985, Jim McDougal wrote to Gov. Bill Clinton to recommend Latham for the Arkansas State Savings and Loan Board. Richard Massey, a friend of Latham, helped connect Madison Guaranty and the Rose Law Firm to help with legal matters. Hillary Clinton also worked with Latham during this period. On July 11, 1985, an internal memo from Jim McDougal to John Latham stated, "I need to know everything you have pending before the Securities Commission as I intend to get with Hillary Clinton within the next few days." On July 11, 1986, the FHLBB told Madison Guaranty's board of directors to remove John Latham because the S&L's troubles had worsened. John Latham became part of Kenneth Starr's investigation into the Whitewater land deal. John Latham attempted to hide a $500,000 insider loan from federal bank examiners, with a nonrecourse debt that had been made to take a warehouse not on Madison's books. He was jailed for six months for bank fraud.
