= Whitewater controversy =

1990s U.S. political controversy

Coordinates: 36.228°N 92.478°W

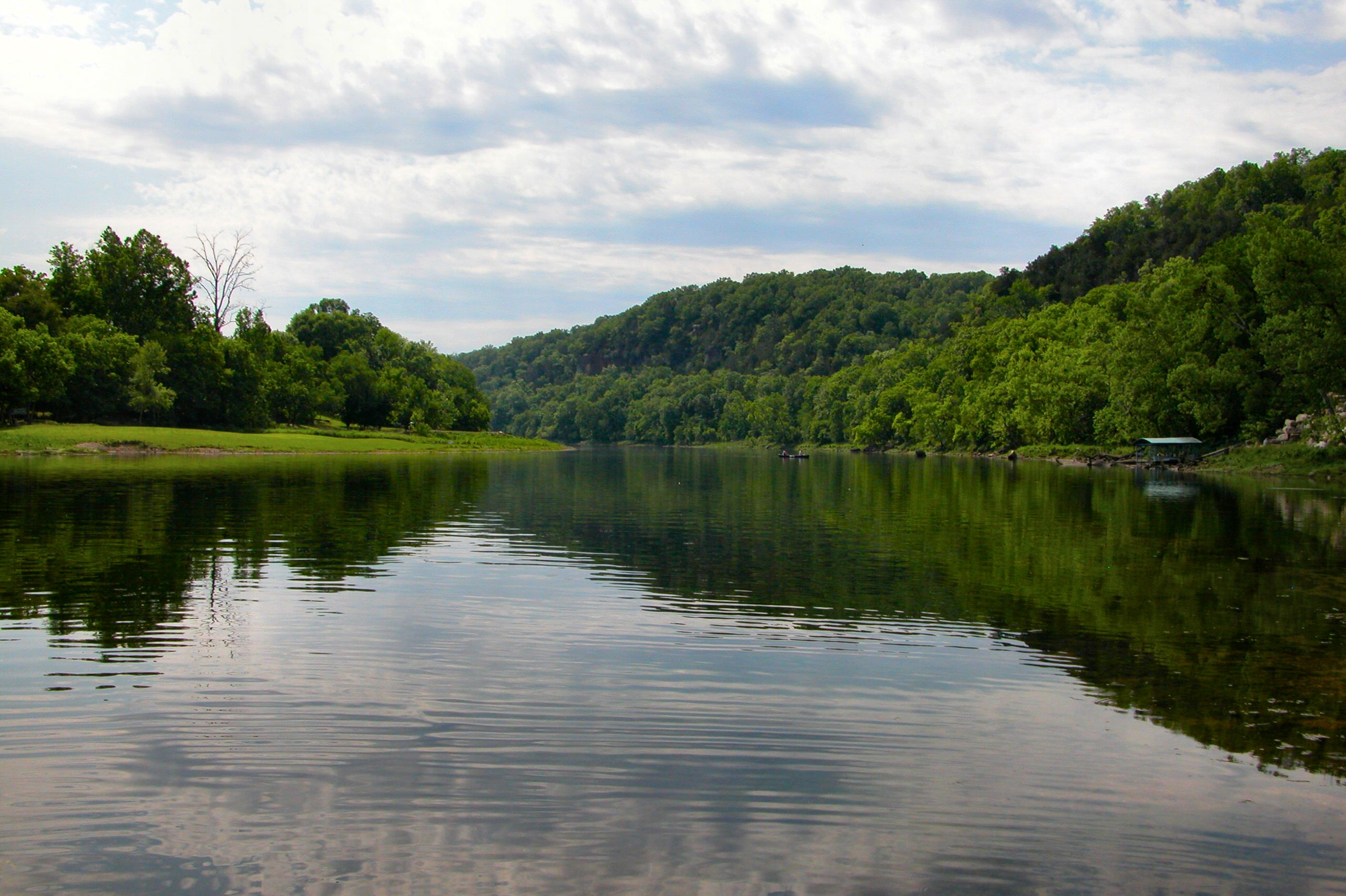
The White River, near Flippin, Arkansas, and the intended site of the Whitewater Development Corporation's vacation homes.

The Whitewater controversy, Whitewater scandal, or simply Whitewater, was an American political controversy during the 1990s, surrounding the Whitewater Development Corporation, a real estate company owned by President Bill Clinton and First Lady Hillary Clinton and their associates, Jim and Susan McDougal.

In 1979, while Clinton was the governor of Arkansas, the Clintons and McDougals incorporated the Whitewater Development Corporation with the purpose of building vacation properties on land along the White River near Flippin, Arkansas. The corporation was not a success. In 1989, Madison Guaranty, a savings and loan association owned by Jim McDougal, collapsed amid the national savings and loan crisis. Whitewater came to public attention on March 8, 1992, when The New York Times reported on Whitewater during Clinton's campaign for president of the United States.

Neither Bill nor Hillary Clinton was prosecuted for their role in the corporation or their conduct during the numerous investigations. Three separate independent inquiries found insufficient evidence linking them with the criminal conduct of the others involved in Whitewater. However, the McDougals; Jim Guy Tucker, Clinton's successor as governor of Arkansas; and twelve other people involved in the scandal were convicted for over forty financial crimes. President Clinton pardoned Susan McDougal before leaving office; Jim McDougal died in 1998.

== Nomenclature ==
The term "Whitewater" is sometimes used to include other controversies from the Bill Clinton administration, such as Travelgate, Filegate, and the circumstances surrounding Vince Foster's death, that were also investigated by the Whitewater Independent Counsel, but Whitewater properly refers to the matters stemming from the Whitewater Development Corporation, the association between the Clintons and McDougals, and subsequent developments.

== Background ==
=== Whitewater Development Corporation ===
Bill Clinton first met Jim McDougal, an Arkansas businessman and political figure, in 1968. Clinton first invested in real estate with McDougal in 1977. In spring 1978, McDougal proposed that the Clintons join him and his wife, Susan, in buying 230 acres (93 ha) of undeveloped land on the south bank of the White River near Flippin, Arkansas, in the Ozark Mountains. The goal was to subdivide the site into lots for vacation homes for the large number of Midwesterners interested in Ozark vacation homes, owing to the low property taxes, fishing, rafting, and mountain scenery. The plan was to hold the property for a few years and then sell the lots at a profit.

The Clintons and McDougals borrowed $203,000 to buy the land and subsequently transferred ownership to the newly created Whitewater Development Corporation, in which all four participants had equal shares. In the following years, the Clintons contributed additional funds to Jim McDougal, which he claimed were necessary to pay interest on the loan and other expenses; the Clintons later claimed to have no knowledge of how these funds were used. Susan McDougal chose the name "Whitewater Estates," and their sales pitch was, "One weekend here and you'll never want to live anywhere else." The business was incorporated on June 18, 1979.

By the time the lots were surveyed and available for sale at the end of 1979, interest rates in the United States had climbed to near 20%, and prospective buyers could no longer afford vacation homes. Rather than accepting a loss on the venture, the four decided to build a model home and wait for better economic conditions to sell. In May 1985, Jim McDougal sold the remaining lots to a local realtor, Chris Wade. By 1993, when the property attracted public attention as part of the controversy, there were a few occupied houses on the site, but most of the properties were still for sale. One owner, tired of the many reporters who visited the site, hung a sign saying "Go Home, Idiots".

Ultimately, the Clintons lost between $37,000 and $69,000 on their investment in Whitewater, less than the McDougals despite their equal legal ownership. The cause of the unequal losses are unknown, but Clinton's critics later cited the discrepancy as evidence that Clinton provided intangible, potentially corrupt, contributions to the project.

=== Madison Guaranty and Castle Grande investment ===
When Bill Clinton lost his campaign for re-election as governor in 1980, McDougal lost his job as the governor's economic aide and decided to go into banking. He bought the Bank of Kingston with Susan in 1980, renaming it Madison Bank & Trust, and the Woodruff Savings & Loan in 1982, which he renamed the Madison Guaranty Savings & Loan. Clinton was returned to office in the 1982 election and re-elected in 1984, 1986, and 1990.

In spring 1985, McDougal held a fundraiser for Clinton at Madison Guaranty's office in Little Rock, which paid off $50,000 in campaign debt. McDougal personally raised $35,000, of which $12,000 was in Madison Guaranty cashier's checks.

In 1985, Jim McDougal purchased Castle Grande, a 1,000 acre (400 ha) real estate development south of Little Rock. The investment required about $1.75 million, more than McDougal could afford on his own, and under law at the time, McDougal could borrow only $600,000 from his own savings and loan association. Therefore, McDougal and others, including Madison Guaranty official Seth Ward, funneled the additional $1.15 million from Madison Guaranty through several other investors and intermediaries. Hillary Clinton, then an attorney at Rose Law Firm in Little Rock, provided legal services to Castle Grande.

In 1986, federal regulators investigated McDougal and Castle Grande for fraud. In July, McDougal resigned from Madison Guaranty, and Ward and the Rose Law attorney who drafted the agreement fell under investigation. In 1989, Castle Grande collapsed, at a cost of $4 million, in turn triggering the collapse and federal takeover of Madison Guaranty. Taking place in the midst of the nationwide savings and loan crisis, the failure of Madison Guaranty cost the United States government $73 million.

After the dissolution of Madison Guaranty, the Resolution Trust Company, a government-owned company charged with liquidating the assets of insolvent S&Ls, hired the law firm Pillsbury, Madison & Sutro to investigate. The Pillsbury report concluded that Clinton had been a passive investor in the Whitewater venture. The Associated Press characterized it as "generally support[ing] the Clintons' description of their involvement in Whitewater." However, Charles Patterson, the supervising attorney "refused ... to call it a vindication" of the Clintons, as the White House claimed, testifying before the Whitewater Committee, "it was not our purpose to vindicate, castigate, exculpate."

== Initial investigations ==
During Bill Clinton's 1992 presidential run, he was asked by New York Times reporters about the failure of the Whitewater development. The subsequent New York Times article, by reporter Jeff Gerth, appeared on March 8, 1992. The Clintons acknowledged that on their 1984 and 1985 tax returns, they had claimed improper tax deductions for interest payments made by the Whitewater Development Company. Due to the age of the mistake, the Clintons were not obligated to rectify the claim, but Bill Clinton announced that they would do so.

On December 28, 1993, almost two years after the original Times report, the Clintons made a reimbursement payment of $4,900 to the Internal Revenue Service. The payment was made without filing an amended return and included full interest on the amount of the error, including the additional two-year delay. Files which were later publicly released in August 1995 showed that the Clintons were aware that the interest payments in question were paid by the corporation and not them personally.

=== Resolution Trust Corporation investigation ===
As a result of The New York Times article, the Department of Justice opened an investigation into the failed Whitewater investments. The New York Times article stimulated the interest of L. Jean Lewis, an investigator with the Resolution Trust Corporation looking into the Madison Guaranty failure. Lewis sought to connect the Clintons to Madison Guaranty and on September 2, 1992, she submitted a criminal referral to the FBI naming them as witnesses. U.S. Attorney for the Eastern District of Arkansas Charles Banks and the Federal Bureau of Investigation determined that the referral lacked merit, but Lewis persisted to recommend criminal prosecutions. Her referrals eventually became public knowledge, and she testified before the Senate Whitewater Committee in 1995.

On February 25, 1994, White House senior advisor George Stephanopoulos and deputy chief of staff Harold M. Ickes held a conference call with Deputy Secretary of the Treasury Roger Altman, in which they protested the hiring of Jay Stephens, who was heading the Resolution Trust Company investigation into Madison Guaranty. On the call, Stephanopoulos asked Altman if Stephens could be removed. Altman resigned on August 17, 1994 under scrutiny.

=== White House Counsel investigation ===
Deputy White House Counsel Vince Foster was investigating Whitewater at the time of his suicide on July 20, 1993. Within hours of Foster's death, chief counsel Bernard Nussbaum removed documents, some of which concerned Whitewater, from Foster's office and gave them to Maggie Williams, chief of staff to Hillary Clinton. According to The New York Times, Williams then placed the documents in a safe in the Clinton residence on the third floor of the White House for five days, before turning them over to the Clinton family lawyer. Nussbaum was accused of obstructing investigations by both the Department of Justice and National Park Service into Foster's death by refusing to hand over documents found in Foster's briefcase.

On April 22, 1994, Hillary Clinton gave a press conference in the State Dining Room of the White House to address questions on Whitewater and the separate controversy surrounding her 1978–79 investments in cattle futures. During the conference, she claimed that the Clintons were passive investors in Whitewater and had committed no wrongdoing. She said that she no longer opposed the appointment of a special prosecutor to investigate the matter and won praise for her conduct in the press conference.

=== Webster Hubbell ===
Beginning in February 1994, attorney Theodore Olson wrote several essays for The American Spectator, accusing Clinton and his associates of wrongdoing. Olson's earliest allegations led to the discovery that Associate Attorney General Webster Hubbell, a friend of Hillary Clinton and former Rose Law Firm partner, had committed multiple frauds, mostly against his own firm and firm clients.

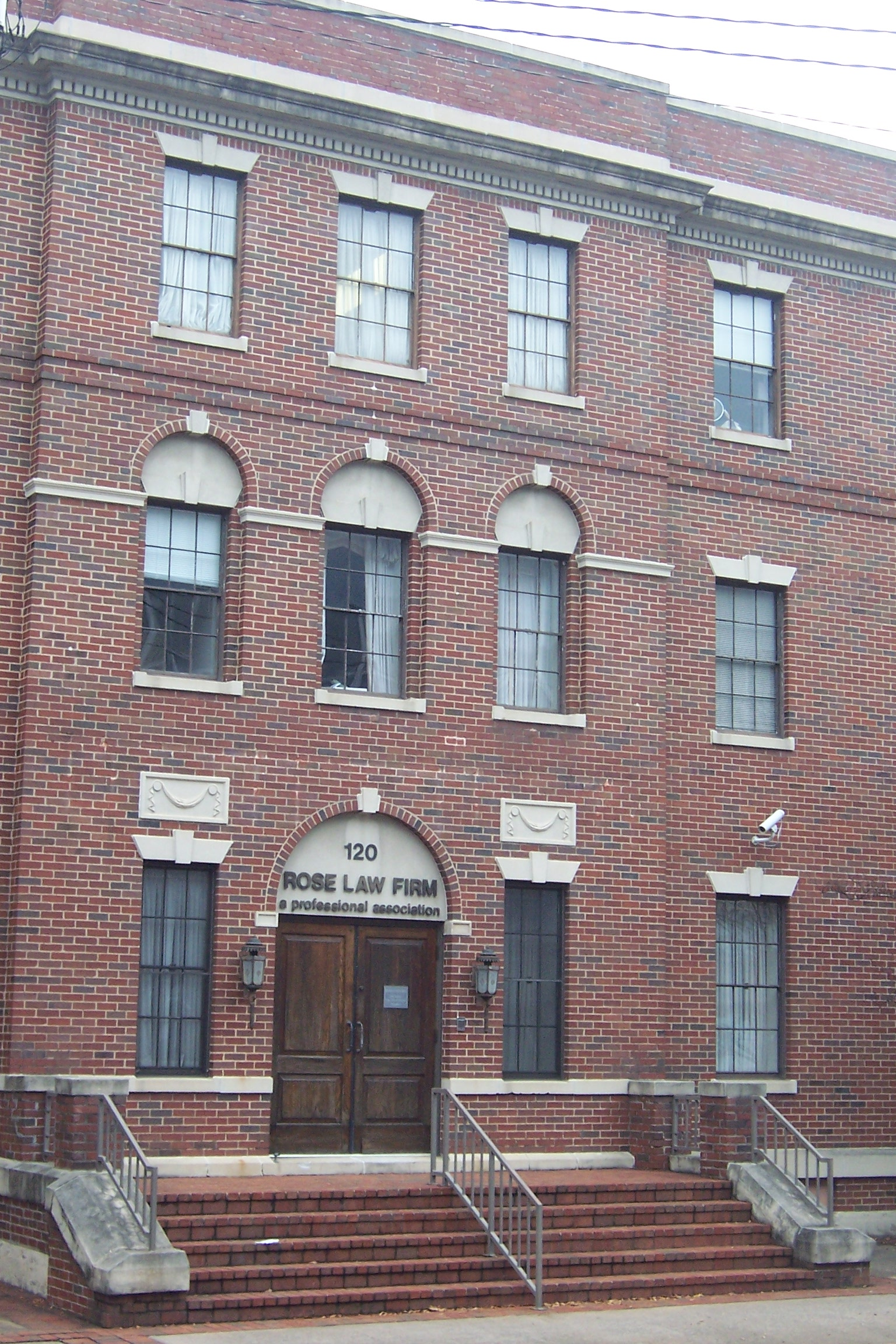
Hillary Rodham Clinton worked on the third floor of Rose Law Firm. Her billing records from the mid-1980s would become the subject of intrigue during the Whitewater controversy.

On April 14, 1994, Hubbell resigned. After Hubbell's resignation, chief of staff Mack McLarty, personnel director Bruce Lindsey, and Clinton friend Vernon Jordan arranged for Hubbell to be paid from consulting contracts. They did so with the approval of the Clintons. In December 1994, Hubbell pleaded guilty to mail fraud and tax evasion.

=== Fiske investigation ===
At the president's request, Attorney General Janet Reno appointed Robert B. Fiske, the former U.S. attorney for the Southern District of New York, as special prosecutor to investigate the legality of the Whitewater transactions. The Fiske investigation surfaced two direct allegations against Clinton. First, Arkansas businessman David Hale had alleged in November 1992 that Clinton had exerted pressure on Hale to make an illegal $300,000 loan to Susan McDougal. Second, Fiske revealed allegations that an Arkansas bank had concealed transactions involving Clinton's 1990 gubernatorial campaign. In May 1994, Fiske issued a grand jury subpoena to the Clintons for all documents relating to Madison Guaranty; the Clintons reported that the documents were missing. Almost two years later, the subpoenaed billing records of the Rose Law Firm were discovered in the Clintons' private residence in the White House. Hillary Clinton's fingerprints, among others, were found on the documents.

On June 30, Fiske released an interim report that concluded that Clinton and White House officials had not interfered with the Resolution Trust Corporation and that Vince Foster died by suicide. On the same day, Clinton signed the Independent Counsel Reauthorization Act of 1994, which effectively abolished the position of special prosecutor and replaced it with the position of independent counsel. Under the new law, the Special Division of the United States Court of Appeals for the District of Columbia Circuit, consisting of three circuit court judges appointed by the Chief Justice of the United States, had sole authority to appoint independent counsel.

=== Congressional investigations ===
Parallel to Fiske, both houses of the United States Congress began investigating Whitewater.

The House Committee on Financial Services had been scheduled to begin hearings in late March 1994, but they were postponed after chair Henry B. Gonzalez attacked ranking member Jim Leach in writing as "obstinate," "obdurate," "in willful disregard" of House etiquette, and "premeditatedly" plotting a "judicial adventure". The hearings began in late July 1994.

The Senate Banking, Housing, and Urban Affairs Committee also began hearings on Whitewater in July 1994. In May 1995, after Republicans gained control of the Senate, they established the Special Committee to Investigate Whitewater Development Corporation and Related Matters, chaired by Banking Committee chairman Al D'Amato. The Special Committee hearings ran for 300 hours over 60 sessions across 13 months, resulting in over 10,000 pages of testimony and 35,000 pages of depositions from almost 250 people. The Senate investigation was generally partisan, with Republicans investigating Clinton and Democrats defending him. The Special Committee issued its 800-page majority report on June 18, 1996, which only hinted at one possible improper action by President Clinton, but referred to the Clinton administration as "an American presidency [that] misused its power, circumvented the limits on its authority and attempted to manipulate the truth." Hillary Clinton came in for much stronger criticism, as "the central figure" in the alleged wrongdoings. The Democratic minority called the findings "a legislative travesty," "a witch hunt," and "a political game."

== Starr investigation ==
Under the Independent Counsel Reauthorization Act, the Special Division appointed former U.S. solicitor general Ken Starr to replace Fiske. Starr oversaw the investigation into Whitewater for the next four years, from August 5, 1994 until September 11, 1998. Starr's investigation included not only Whitewater but a number of scandals involving Clinton and the White House, including the firing of White House travel office employees, alleged misuse of FBI files, and Clinton's conduct as a defendant in Jones v. Clinton, a sexual harassment lawsuit filed by a former Arkansas government employee. Starr's investigation came to focus on the last of these scandals, particularly allegations that Clinton had perjured himself by lying about a sexual relationship with White House intern Monica Lewinsky.

=== Hale allegations ===
Hale, who had alleged that Clinton pressured him to provide an illegal $300,000 loan to Susan McDougal, was the key witness in the Starr investigation. Clinton denied these allegations, and Clinton supporters claimed that Hale had received cash payments from conservative political activists to implicate Clinton and his associates. By this time, Hale had already pleaded guilty to two felonies and secured a reduction in his sentence in exchange for testimony against Clinton. At trial, his defense strategy had been to present Hale as the victim of high-powered politicians, who had forced Hale to launder the money. His implication of Clinton was undermined by a 1989 investigation by the FBI into Madison Guaranty. According to the official FBI memorandum, Hale had described his dealings with the McDougals, attorney Jim Guy Tucker, and several others in detail, but had never mentioned Clinton.

Arkansas state prosecutors issued an arrest warrant for Hale in early July 1996, charging that he had misrepresented the solvency of his insurance company, National Savings Life. The prosecutors also alleged that Hale had made those misrepresentations to conceal embezzlement. Hale said that any infraction was a technicality and that no one had lost any money.

Hale pleaded guilty in the Whitewater case to two felonies and served 21 months of a 28-month sentence.

On November 19, 1998, Starr testified before the House Judiciary Committee in connection with the impeachment of Clinton. Starr said that in late 1997, he had drafted an impeachment report alleging that there was "substantial and credible evidence" that Clinton had committed perjury regarding the fraudulent $300,000 loan. Starr said that he held back the charges because he was not sure that the two major witnesses had told the truth, but that the investigation was still ongoing.

In March 1999, Hale pleaded guilty of fraud in the Arkansas insurance case.

Charges that Hale had been paid in exchange for implicating Clinton were fully investigated by Michael E. Shaheen Jr. Shaheen delivered his report to Starr in July 1999, which recommended that the allegations that Hale had been paid in hopes of influencing his testimony were "unsubstantiated or, in some cases, untrue." No federal charges were brought against Hale or The American Spectator, though Hale later pled guilty in the Whitewater case to two felonies and served 21 months of a 28-month sentence.

=== Susan McDougal ===
Webster Hubbell, Jim Guy Tucker, and Susan McDougal all refused to cooperate with Starr's investigation. When the Arkansas grand jury did conclude its work in May 1998, after 30 months in panel, it came up with only a contempt indictment against Susan McDougal. Although she refused to testify under oath, Susan McDougal told the media that the Clintons had been truthful, and she claimed Jim McDougal felt abandoned by Clinton and had told her that "he was going to pay back the Clintons." She also claimed that her husband had told her Little Rock lawyer Sheffield Nelson, Clinton's Republican opponent in 1990, was willing to "pay him some money" to speak to The New York Times, and that in 1992, he told her that one of Clinton's political enemies was paying him to talk to The New York Times.

McDougal claimed Starr had offered her "global immunity" from other charges if she cooperated with his investigation, but she refused to answer any questions while under oath and was imprisoned for civil contempt of court for the maximum 18 months, including eight months in isolation. Starr indicted McDougal for criminal contempt of court. The charges resulted in a jury hung 7–5, in favor of acquittal. President Clinton later pardoned her shortly before leaving office.

On January 26, 1996, Hillary Clinton testified before a grand jury concerning her investments in Whitewater. This was the first time in American history that a First Lady had been subpoenaed to testify before a grand jury. She testified that they never borrowed any money from the bank, and denied having caused anyone to borrow money on their behalf.

=== Starr Report ===
On September 9, 1998, Starr delivered his official report to Congress. The report only mentioned Whitewater in passing, instead focusing on allegations that Clinton had lied under oath, as part of the Lewinsky scandal. The report said, "the jobs and money paid to Mr. Hubbell by friends and contributors to the President had raised serious questions about whether such assistance was designed to influence Mr. Hubbell’s testimony about Madison-related matters." Starr exonerated Clinton of any wrongdoing in the Travelgate and Filegate matters.

Regarding the reappearance of Hillary Clinton's billing records in the White House safe, Starr said the investigation had found no explanation for the disappearance or for the reappearance. "After a thorough investigation," Starr said, "we have found no explanation how the billing records got where they were or why they were not discovered and produced earlier. It remains a mystery to this day."

The Starr Report was poorly received by the Clintons' most fervent critics. For example, Christopher Ruddy of the Pittsburgh Tribune-Review claimed that Starr had not investigated Vince Foster's suicide thoroughly enough. Starr also declined to recommend prosecution of Susan Thomases or Webster Hubbell, who were alleged to have lied to Congress, and Harold M. Ickes, who was accused of misleading Congress. Democratic representative Barney Frank also criticized Starr for withholding his findings which were favorable to the Clintons until after the 1998 elections.

== Ray investigation ==
Starr's successor, Robert Ray, released a report in September 2000, that stated "This office determined that the evidence was insufficient to prove to a jury beyond a reasonable doubt that either President or Mrs. Clinton knowingly participated in any criminal conduct." Nevertheless, Ray criticized the White House saying that delays in the production of evidence and "unmeritorious litigation" by the president's lawyers severely impeded the investigation's progress, leading to a total cost of nearly $60 million. Ray's report effectively closed the Whitewater investigation.

== Aftermath ==
The Clintons were never charged with any crime. Fifteen other people were convicted of more than 40 crimes, including Jim Guy Tucker, who resigned from office. Several were pardoned by Clinton before he left office:

- Jim Guy Tucker, Governor of Arkansas (three counts of fraud); pardoned by Clinton
- John Haley, attorney for Tucker (tax evasion)
- William J. Marks Sr., Tucker's business partner (conspiracy)
- Stephen Smith, former Clinton aide (conspiracy to misapply funds); pardoned by Clinton
- Webster Hubbell, supporter, Associate Attorney General, and partner at Rose Law Firm (embezzlement, fraud)
- Jim McDougal (August 25, 1940 – March 8, 1998), banker and former Clinton aide (18 felonies, varied). Starting in 1982, McDougal operated Madison Guaranty Savings and Loan Association. McDougal died of a myocardial infarction at the Federal Correctional Facility in Fort Worth, Texas, aged 57.
- Susan McDougal, Clinton supporter and wife of Jim McDougal (multiple frauds); pardoned by Clinton
- David Hale, banker (conspiracy, fraud)
- Neal Ainley, Perry County Bank president (embezzled bank funds for Clinton campaign)
- Chris Wade, Whitewater real estate broker (multiple loan fraud); pardoned by Clinton
- Larry Kuca, Madison real estate agent (multiple loan fraud)
- Robert W. Palmer, Madison appraiser (conspiracy); pardoned by Clinton
- John Latham, Madison Bank CEO (bank fraud)
- Eugene Fitzhugh (multiple bribery)
- Charles Matthews (bribery)

The length, expense, and results of the Whitewater investigations turned the public against the Office of the Independent Counsel; even Kenneth Starr was opposed to it. The Independent Counsel Reauthorization Act was allowed to expire in 1999.

By 2007, there were about 12 houses in the Whitewater subdivision. The last lot was up for sale by Chris Wade Jr. for $25,000. In Flippin, the Madison Guaranty property had been replaced by a variety of small businesses, including a barbershop.

== In popular culture and comedy ==
- On March 19, 1994, for the Saturday Night Live cold open, the entire cast — calling themselves Rockers To Help Explain Whitewater — performed an original song, "Whitewater Explained." (Note: "Whitewater Explained" is the title as it partially appears in the title line of the video at the Saturday Night Live YouTube channel; the full YouTube title is "Cold Opening: Whitewater Explained - Saturday Night Live." The title has also been rendered as "Rockers To Help Explain Whitewater", which is actually the name of the ensemble group. The correct title appears to be "It's Difficult," as performed by the Rockers and implied to be released by Jasmine Records, as the "end credits" of the Cold Open reveal.) Cindy Crawford, as a reporter for MTV News, welcomed "some of the biggest names in rock" to explain the frauds and felonies. The cast members wore wigs and costumes, and sang their lines as vocal impressions of their chosen rock stars. These included Chris Farley as Jerry Garcia, Michael McKean as Elvis Costello, and Phil Hartman as Elton John. The lyrics, which rhyme but don't marshal the number of syllables in a line, begin with Tina Turner (Ellen Cleghorne), who belts out, "Back in 1978, the Clintons bought some land to build vacation homes..." Further lyrics explain critical events, such as Sarah Silverman as Cher singing, "Madison Bank goes under with $60 million missing / MacDougal is arrested, and in a conflict of interest / Hillary's law firm is hired for a suit against the bank that it used to represent / ... And in 1992, Clinton ran for President." Adam Sandler, impersonating Axl Rose, recalls the entrance of Janet Reno, and "finally the President had to bring in Lloyd Cutler, an old Democratic hand / To restore some order to his administration". The ensemble, led by Julia Sweeney and Melanie Hutsell as The Judds, concludes that the public will never know all the details. "The only ones who'll ever know are Hillary and Bill / And MacDougal and his wife / And Webster Hubbell and Margaret Williams / And Vince Foster." Music journalist Troy Reimink calls it "the single best music sketch the show has ever produced", noting that it aired again "in 1995 on a prime-time 20th-anniversary broadcast of highlights," and saying it "feels oddly timeless, if only for the sheer bravado of its execution." Reimink added, "Crucially, each performer is recognizable as both themselves and the star they're imitating, so the reveal of each impression is often the joke. They each get about three seconds to accomplish this, and it works more often than it doesn't: Note the emergence of Kevin Nealon as Michael Bolton or the favorite by crowd reaction, David Spade as Kurt Cobain. [...] The rockers deliver word-salad explanations of Whitewater minutiae, and their subtitled but often unintelligible summaries of the infamously complicated scandal's plot points are just as funny as the physical impersonations themselves." The 'One SNL a Day' Project gave the sketch a rating of 4.5 out of 5 stars and called it "funny ... strong and very memorable."
- Radio personality Bob Rivers was a songwriter of parody songs, which he called "Twisted Tunes." On July 26, 1994, during his stint at radio station KISW-FM in Seattle, he released "Whitewater," a parody of "Black Water" by The Doobie Brothers, on the CD Twisted Tunes 1994 - The Year in Review. The song was performed by Dennis "Fly" Amero, Tom Hambridge, and Grant Goodeve, among others. The Doobie Brothers' chorus runs, "Old black water, keep on rolling / Mississippi moon, won't you keep on shining on me?" Rivers wrote it as, "Oh, Whitewater keeps on churnin' / Those Arkansas buffoons gonna rat on Hillary." The song was re-released on the Twisted Christmas Boxed Set.
- In a February 25, 1996 Doonesbury comic strip, President Clinton (drawn by Garry Trudeau as a floating waffle to depict his indecisiveness) muses, "Wish I knew what really happened with Whitewater..."
- The 2012 play Clinton: The Musical, with text and music by Paul Hodge, portrayed Whitewater as a scandal no one understood. Act I's song "The Day After That" has several reporters shouting at the Clintons; one sings, "No one has any idea what Whitewater is! / But it doesn't matter that we have no clue / 'Cause we can keep pretending that we do!" The Guardian called it "a vibrant stage production reimagining American political history as a rollicking musical."

== See also ==
- Clinton–Lewinsky scandal
- The Hunting of the President
