= Stephen Smith (Whitewater) =

American academic (born 1949)

Stephen A. Smith (born May 15, 1949) is a University of Arkansas communications professor who was a top gubernatorial aide to Bill Clinton in Arkansas, helping the governor run his office. He is an internationally known First Amendment scholar and author of numerous books.

== Whitewater controversy ==
Smith became part of Ken Starr's investigation during the Whitewater scandal; he remained loyal to Clinton. Smith confessed to getting a phony loan from David Hale's company, saying it was to go for a "disadvantaged" political consulting firm Smith operated in the 1980's. The $65,000 loan in fact was for an overdue bank loan Smith had with Jim Guy Tucker. He pleaded guilty on June 8, 1995, to one misdemeanor count of conspiracy.

Smith received a presidential pardon in 2001, one of 140 controversial pardons Clinton issued on his last day of his presidency.

== Written works ==
Smith wrote a fictional book, The Star Chamber, about his experiences under the pen name John Wilkes.
