= Vince Foster =

American lawyer (1945–1993)

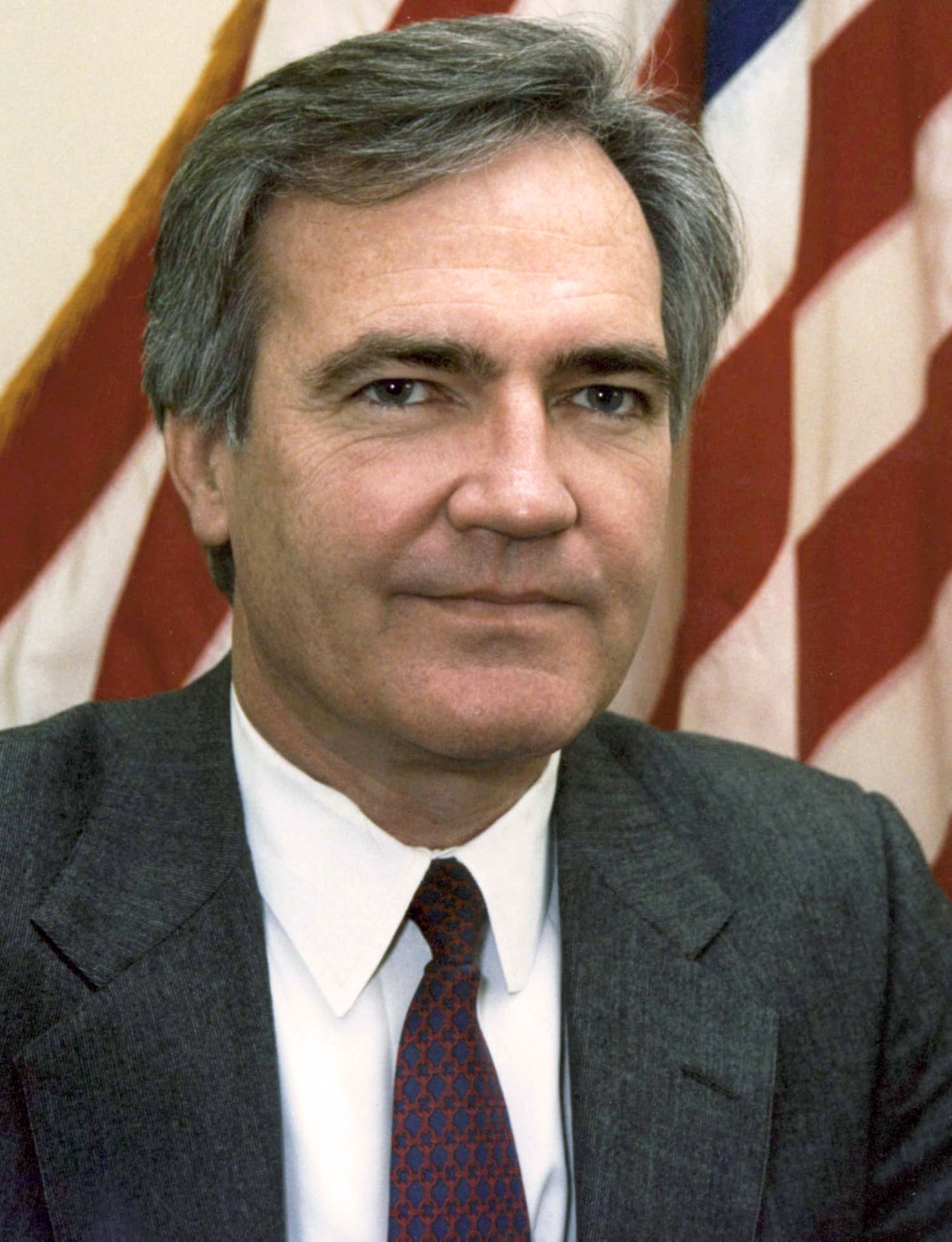
- Foster in February 1993

Deputy White House Counsel
- In office January 20, 1993 – July 20, 1993
- President: Bill Clinton
- Preceded by: John P. Schmitz
- Succeeded by: Joel Klein

Personal details
- Born: Vincent Walker Foster Jr. January 15, 1945 Hope, Arkansas, U.S.
- Died: July 20, 1993 (aged 48) Fairfax County, Virginia, U.S.
- Cause of death: Suicide
- Spouse: Elizabeth Braden (m. 1968)
- Children: 3
- Relatives: Sheila F. Anthony (sister)
- Education: Davidson College (BA); Vanderbilt University; University of Arkansas (JD)

Vincent Walker Foster Jr. (January 15, 1945 – July 20, 1993) was an American attorney who served as deputy White House counsel during the first six months of the Clinton administration.

Foster had been a partner at Rose Law Firm in Little Rock, Arkansas, where, as The Washington Post later wrote, he rose to "the pinnacle of the Arkansas legal establishment." In July 1993, he was found dead of a gunshot wound in Fort Marcy Park. Five official governmental investigations ruled his death a suicide, but several conspiracy theories emerged.

== Early life and education ==
Foster was born in Hope, Arkansas, to Vincent W. Foster Sr. and Alice Mae Foster (1914–2012). His father became a successful real estate developer. Vincent had two sisters, Sheila and Sharon.

Vincent was a childhood friend of Bill Clinton, then known as Billy Blythe. Clinton, a year and a half younger than Foster, resided in an adjoining property to Foster's with his grandparents while his mother was often away studying nursing. Clinton later recalled, "I lived with my grandparents in a modest little house across from Vince Foster's nice, big, white brick house." Another Clinton recollection was that Foster "was kind to me and never lorded it over me the way so many older boys did with younger ones." Another childhood friend was Mack McLarty, who would one day become White House Chief of Staff for Clinton. In 1950, Clinton's mother remarried and they relocated to a different part of Hope. By several accounts, Foster and Clinton attended Miss Marie Purkins' School for Little Folks together, a private kindergarten, although Foster was a year ahead in school. Then, around late 1952, the Clintons moved away to Hot Springs. However, Clinton would often return to visit his grandparents in Hope during summers, weekends, and holidays and he maintained connections with the people there.

Foster excelled as a student and athlete. At Hope High School, he became president of the student council, with McLarty serving as vice president. He graduated from Hope High School in 1963.

Foster attended Davidson College, graduating with a bachelor's degree in psychology in 1967. His father wanted him to join the family real estate business, but instead, he opted to attend law school.

After starting at Vanderbilt University Law School, he joined the Arkansas National Guard during the height of the Vietnam War to avoid the military draft. To be closer to his guard responsibilities, he transferred to the University of Arkansas School of Law in Fayetteville, Arkansas, where he was managing editor of the law review. He received his Juris Doctor in 1971, graduating first in his class. He scored the highest in his class on the Arkansas bar exam.

== Marriage and family ==
Foster met Elizabeth Braden, known as Lisa, during his sophomore year at Davidson; she was the daughter of an insurance broker from Nashville and was attending Sweet Briar College. They married on April 20, 1968, at St. Henry Catholic Church in Nashville. They had three children: Vincent III, Laura, and John.

== Career ==
=== Lawyer in Arkansas ===
In 1971, Foster joined Rose Law Firm in Little Rock, Arkansas, and in 1974 was made partner, one of only nine in the firm at the time. He was the head of the Arkansas Bar Association committee that oversaw legal aid, and as such worked with legal aid clinic worker Hillary Rodham in successfully overcoming an unreasonable measuring requirement for indigent clients. Foster then initiated the hiring of Rodham at Rose Law Firm, where she became its first ever female associate (and later first female partner); Foster and fellow partner Webster Hubbell were instrumental in overcoming the reluctance of other partners to hire a woman. The hiring occurred soon after Bill Clinton was elected attorney general of Arkansas, which led Clinton and Rodham to move from Fayetteville to Little Rock. Foster and Rodham worked together on a number of cases. And as Bill Clinton's political career gained force, Foster supported him. They were also personal friends and Foster was the one who taught their daughter Chelsea Clinton how to swim.

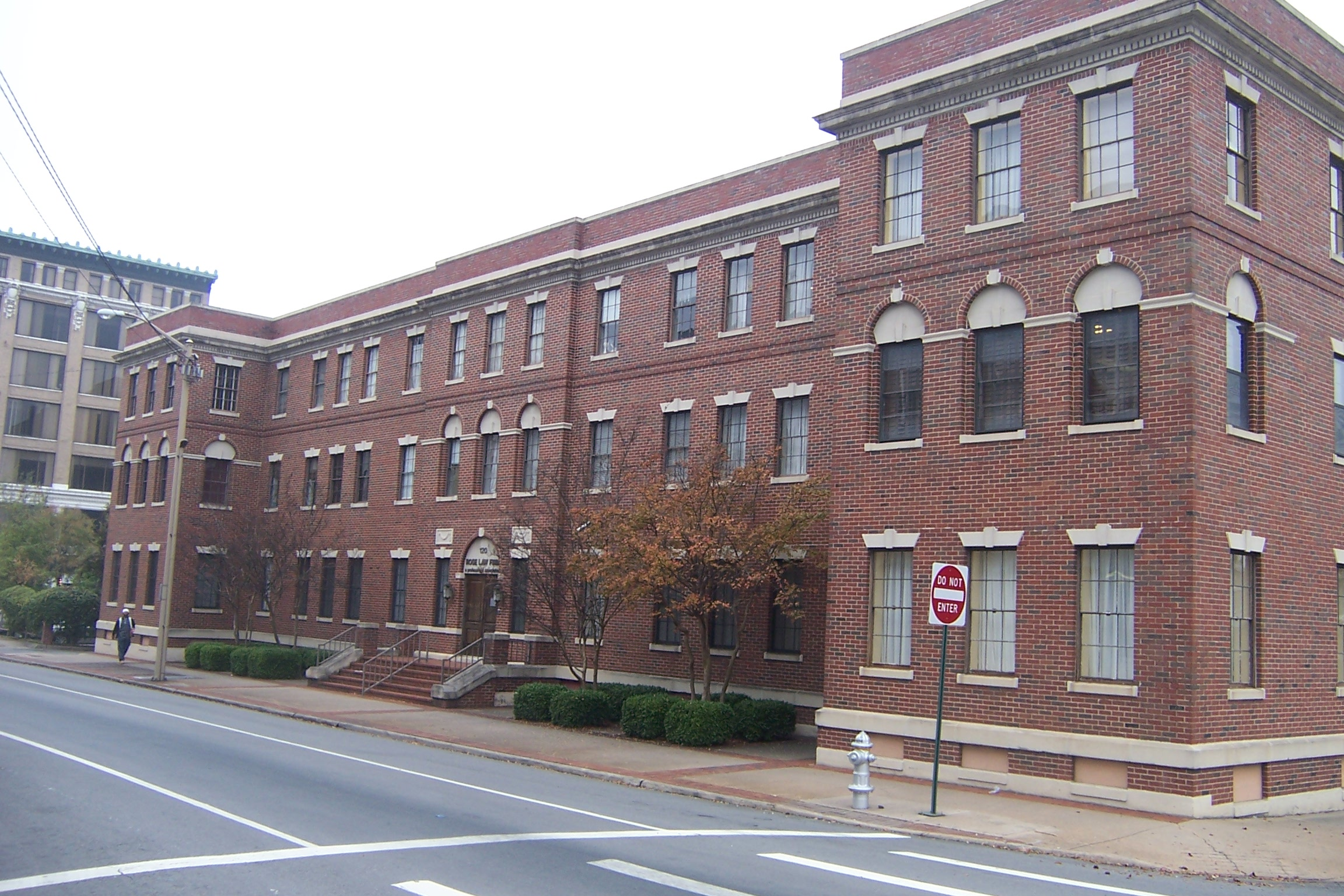
Rose Law Firm in Little Rock, where Foster worked for two decades

Foster practiced mostly corporate law, eventually earning nearly $300,000 a year. Known for his extensive preparation of cases ahead of time, including the creation of decision trees, Foster developed a reputation as one of the best trial litigators in Arkansas. Hillary Rodham Clinton's memoir calls Foster "one of the best lawyers I've ever known," and compared him in style and substance to Gregory Peck's portrayal of Atticus Finch in the classic 1962 film To Kill a Mockingbird. In Bill Clinton's memoir, he characterizes Foster as "a tall, handsome, wise, good man." Writer Carl Bernstein has described Foster as "tall, with impeccable manners and a formal mien ... elegant in perfectly tailored suits, and soft-spoken to the point of taciturnity." Writer Dan Moldea characterized him as "a 'can-do' lawyer who worked best when under pressure." Phillip Carroll, the leading litigator at Rose Law Firm, once said of Foster, "He was my ideal of a young lawyer." The ABA Journal reported that Foster was "acknowledged by many as the soul of the firm".

He appeared to experience only success at Rose Law; a partner later said, "I never saw a professional setback. Never. Not even a tiny one." The firm grew five times its size during his time there. The Arkansas Bar Association gave him a number of awards and in June 1993 would name him as its Outstanding Lawyer of the Year. He was also listed in the Best Lawyers in America book. His wife Lisa described him as driven to prevail, staying up around the clock to prepare for big cases, believing he would lose the case even though he rarely did; she later viewed this as an early sign of depressed behavior.

By 1992, Vince Foster was, as The Washington Post later wrote, at "the pinnacle of the Arkansas legal establishment." He was also an established figure in Little Rock society, serving as the chair of the board of the Arkansas Repertory Theatre and belonging to the exclusive Country Club of Little Rock.

=== White House counsel ===
After Clinton's 1992 election, Foster joined Clinton's presidential transition team. Once Clinton was inaugurated, Foster joined his White House staff as Deputy White House Counsel in early 1993. This was despite Foster's initial reluctance to leave his Little Rock life behind and come to Washington. There he worked under the White House Counsel, Bernard W. Nussbaum, although Nussbaum would consider the pair to be "co-senior partners". He was also joined with two other Rose Law Firm partners, William H. Kennedy, III, who served as his associate counsel, and Webster Hubbell, who became Associate Attorney General. The Foster residence was a small rented house in Georgetown in Washington, D.C.

Foster had difficulty making the transition to life and politics in Washington. Unlike some other Clinton-associated figures, he had no experience with campaigns or electoral politics. His wife and youngest son were not with him, having stayed behind in Arkansas so the son could complete his senior year of high school at Catholic High in Little Rock. His initial role was in vetting potential administration appointees. As one subject of the vetting process later said, "I wondered why I was being interviewed by the guy who would be deputy counsel. Seemed his job was to find out how honest I was, and what level of ego I was bringing. It's a measure of how much the Clintons trusted him." But Foster found this involvement in vetting appointments to be causing him depression and anxiety. In particular, he blamed himself for the failed Zoë Baird nomination; he had thought that Baird had been justified in following her lawyer's advice regarding the payment of taxes on household employees, but he had failed to anticipate the political backlash that led to it becoming known as "Nannygate" and that blemished the early days of the administration. The equally unsuccessful Kimba Wood and Lani Guinier appointments were also under Foster's purview. He had to resign from the Country Club of Little Rock once its all-white membership became a political issue for others in the administration.

As Deputy Counsel, Foster was also involved in a range of other matters, including preparation of executive orders, analyzing the legal effect of various policies, examining international treaties, discussing the ramifications of authorizations for use of military force, and authorizing expenditures within the White House. Foster worked on placing the Clintons' financial holdings into a blind trust.

He handled the Clintons' Madison Guaranty and Industrial Development Corporation paperwork and also several Whitewater-related tax returns. He worked twelve-hour days, six or seven days a week, and although thin to begin with, began losing weight.

On May 8, 1993, Foster gave the commencement address at the University of Arkansas Law School, his alma mater, and said:

The reputation you develop for intellectual and ethical integrity will be your greatest asset or your worst enemy. You will be judged by your judgment. ... Treat every pleading, every brief, every contract, every letter, every daily task as if your career will be judged on it ... There is no victory, no advantage, no fee, no favor, which is worth even a blemish on your reputation for intellect and integrity. ... Dents to the reputation in the legal profession are irreparable.

One faculty member listening to it recalled telling another that it was "the most depressing graduation speech I had ever heard, in both content and manner." A friend of Foster's has said, "Look, it's just crazy, right? You get one dent and it can never be fixed? In Washington, you get them all the time. You get twenty dents and you go to the body shop. Vince couldn't see that, apparently."

== Depression and death ==
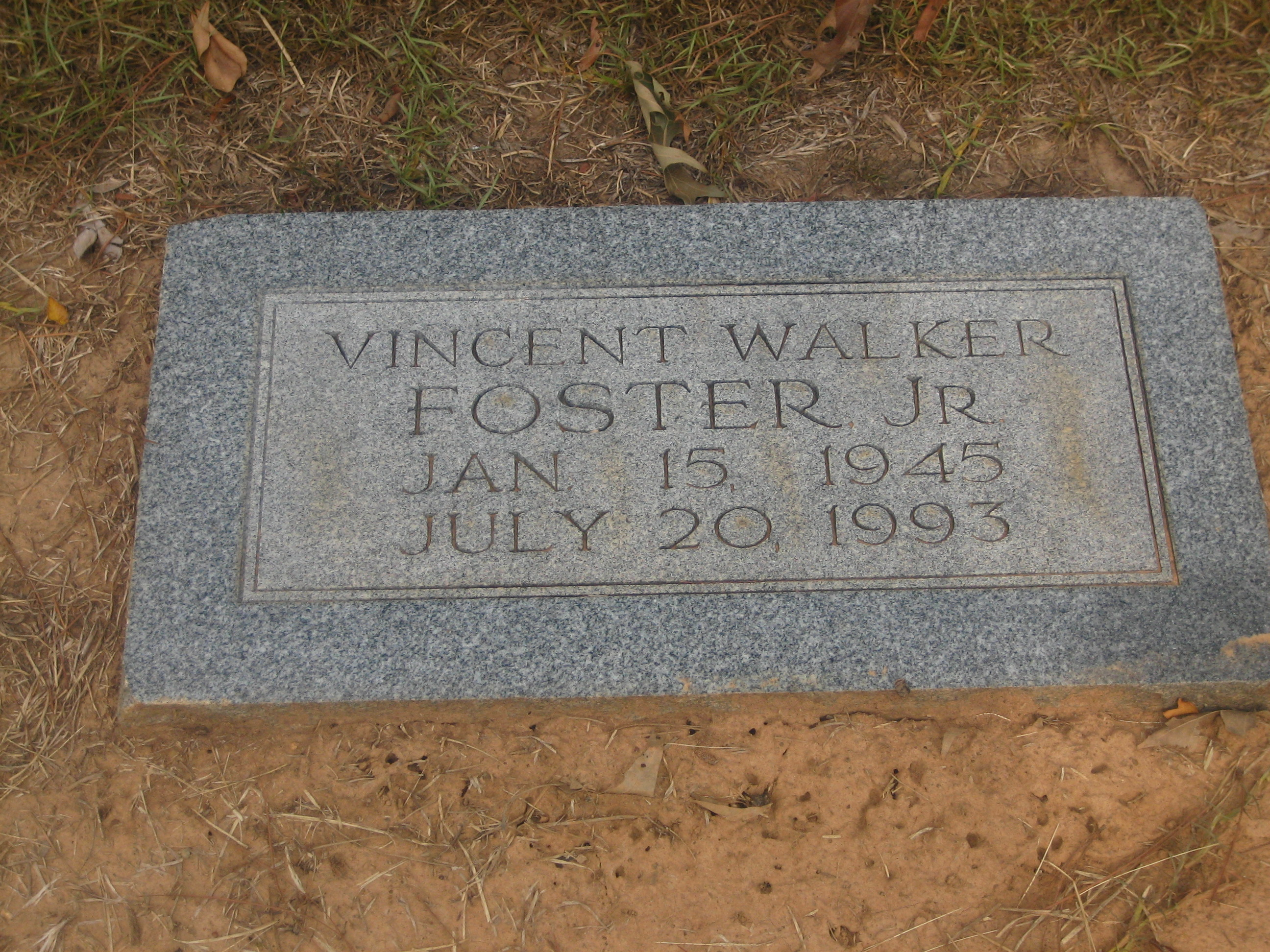
Grave of Vince Foster at Memory Gardens Cemetery in his boyhood home of Hope

Four days after the commencement speech, the White House travel office controversy erupted. Foster was the target of several critical Wall Street Journal editorials in June and July 1993, with titles such as "Who is Vincent Foster?" He became quite upset over the travel office matter and the possibility of a congressional hearing at which he might have been called to testify. Disliking the public spotlight and having continued weight loss and insomnia, he considered resigning his position but feared a personal humiliation upon returning to Arkansas.

Struggling with depression, which after his death was assessed as clinical depression, Foster was prescribed the anti-depressant medication trazodone over the phone by his Arkansas doctor, starting with a low initial dosage. The next day, Foster was found dead in Fort Marcy Park, a federal park in Virginia. He was 48 years old. An autopsy determined that he was shot in the mouth and no other wounds were found on his body.

A draft resignation letter was found torn into 27 pieces in his briefcase. The letter contained a list of grievances, including, "The WSJ editors lie without consequence" and saying, "I was not meant for the job or the spotlight of public life in Washington. Here ruining people is considered sport."

His funeral mass was held at the St. Andrew's Cathedral in Little Rock. Bill Clinton gave a eulogy in which he recalled their boyhood times together and quoted a line from Leon Russell's "A Song for You": "I love you in a place that has no space and time."

Foster is buried in Memory Gardens Cemetery in his hometown of Hope. Foster was survived by his wife and three children.

=== Subsequent investigations ===
Five official or governmental investigations into Foster's death all concluded that he died of suicide.

- The first investigation was conducted by the United States Park Police, in whose jurisdiction the death occurred, in 1993. Because of Foster's position in the White House, the Federal Bureau of Investigation assisted in the investigation, as did several other state and federal agencies. The result of this investigation was released as a joint report from the Department of Justice, FBI, and the Park Police on August 10, 1993, and it stated: "The condition of the scene, the medical examiner's findings and the information gathered clearly indicate that Mr. Foster committed suicide."
- Investigations by a coroner and Independent Counsel Robert B. Fiske, in a 58-page report released on June 30, 1994, also concluded that Foster's death was a suicide. This report made use of FBI resources and incorporated the views of several experienced pathologists; it concluded: "The overwhelming weight of the evidence compels the conclusion ... that Vincent Foster committed suicide in Fort Marcy Park on July 20, 1993."
- A pair of investigations by the U.S. Congress found that Foster died of suicide: One was by Representative William F. Clinger Jr. of Pennsylvania, the ranking Republican on the House Government Reform and Oversight Committee, who reached this conclusion in findings published on August 12, 1994. The other was by the Senate Committee on Banking, Housing, and Urban Affairs, wherein both the majority Democrats and minority Republicans on the committee developed findings that reached the same conclusion in reports issued on January 3, 1995. Theories of a cover-up persisted, however, some of which were promulgated by the Arkansas Project.
- After a three-year investigation, Whitewater independent counsel Ken Starr released a report on October 10, 1997, also concluding that the death was a suicide. In response, Sheila Foster Anthony, Vince Foster's sister, said she agreed with Starr's findings but criticized his investigation for having taken so long, thus contributing to the existence of "ridiculous conspiracy theories proffered by those with a profit or political motive". The inclusion of Foster's death in the Starr investigation, and the length of time it took, was in part due to the role of Starr associate counsel Brett Kavanaugh. Kavanaugh's role in this became controversial two decades later during his Supreme Court nomination process.

In 2004, the Supreme Court ruled unanimously in National Archives and Records Administration v. Favish that the pictures of the scene and autopsy should not be released.

== Legacy ==
Foster's death, occurring just six months into the new administration, is thought by some to have ended the optimism and remaining innocence of the White House staff. White House chief of staff and childhood friend Mack McLarty said that "It was a deep cut. It clearly had a tremendous impact." Nussbaum speculated that if Foster had lived, he would have helped resist the calls to appoint independent counsels and the many investigations lumped under the Whitewater umbrella that occupied the administration and Clinton for the rest of his presidency might not have happened. As it did happen, how Hillary Clinton's chief of staff, Maggie Williams, in particular handled Foster's files and documents immediately after his death became an issue of much investigation itself.

Years later, Bill Clinton expressed his continued anger about the Foster rumors and theories, clenching a fist as he spoke: "I heard a lot of the right-wing talk show people ... and all the sleazy stuff they said. They didn't give a rip that he had killed himself or that his family was miserable or that they could break the hearts [of Foster's friends and family]. It was just another weapon to slug us with, to dehumanize us with."

Foster's death also had an effect on Rose Law Firm, as many within the firm had expected Foster to become its leader once he returned from service in Washington. As one partner later said, "In meetings of the partners, he didn't often take a vocal stand. ... But when he did, it almost always swayed the firm. When he left for Washington, people here spoke openly about the emotional vacuum." Colleagues speculated that Foster might have someday become president of the state bar association or a choice for a federal judgeship.

Beginning in 1993, the Vince Foster Jr. Outstanding Lawyer Award was given out annually by the Pulaski County Bar Association to recognize members who contributed to the bar and advanced the legal profession. An endowed chair at the University of Arkansas School of Law, the Vincent Foster University Professor of Legal Ethics and Professional Responsibility, was created in his name. In 2015 a holder of the chair, Howard W. Brill, was appointed Chief Justice of the Arkansas Supreme Court.
