= John Haley (attorney) =

John Harvey Haley (1930 or 1931 – December 4, 2003) was an American attorney who pled guilty to an offense in connection with the Whitewater controversy.

== Early life and education ==
Born in Hot Springs, Arkansas, Haley graduated from high school in Siloam Springs and earned his undergraduate degree from Emory University and his law degree from the University of Arkansas.

== Career ==
Haley clerked for Judge George Rose Smith of the Arkansas Supreme Court, then joined the Rose Law Firm as a partner and subsequently opened his own law firm in Little Rock. He later was a member of various Arkansas law firms and headed a commercial real estate company.

In 1964, Haley started the Election Research Council, which was funded by Winthrop Rockefeller to expose and combat voter fraud in Arkansas. Following Rockefeller's election as governor, he was appointed Chairman of the Arkansas Board of Corrections, the oversight agency of the state's Department of Corrections, where he worked for prison reform. He was also chairman of the Arkansas Board of Law Examiners and the Arkansas Pardon and Parole Board.

Haley was a friend and personal attorney of Jim Guy Tucker, who succeeded Bill Clinton as governor of Arkansas. During the Whitewater investigation, he was accused of assisting Tucker and a cable TV developer, William Marks, in concealing assets to avoid taxes through a false claim of bankruptcy. He pled not guilty on one felony charge on June 22, 1995. In February 1998 he pled guilty on a misdemeanor charge in exchange for dismissal of the felony charge of conspiracy to impede the Internal Revenue Service, and was sentenced to pay a $30,000 fine and $40,000 in restitution.

== Personal life and death ==
Haley and his wife Cynthia had two sons and two daughters. He was formerly married to Maria Luisa Mabilangan Haley; in 2007 she was appointed head of the state Department of Economic Development.

He died at the age of 72 on December 4, 2003, when the small plane he was piloting crashed during an attempted landing at the Boone County Airport in northwest Arkansas. A passenger was also killed.
