= Eugene Fitzhugh =

Former American lawyer

Eugene C. Fitzhugh (May 11, 1926 – August 21, 2007) was an American lawyer and businessman from Little Rock, Arkansas.

On June 23, 1994, he pleaded guilty to trying to bribe David Hale. In exchange for his bribery plea, he was sentenced to 28 months, and prosecutors dropped charges accusing him of conspiring to defraud the Small Business Administration. He also received one year of probation, a $3,000 fine and lost his law license. The guilty plea was part of Kenneth Starr's probe into what is known as the Whitewater investigation and report. He came into front page national news as a result of the Whitewater investigations. He was sentenced with his colleague Charles Matthews.

David Hale is a former Arkansas municipal judge, a former Arkansas banker and a witness in the Whitewater scandal trials.
