= Richard Ben-Veniste =

American lawyer (born 1943)

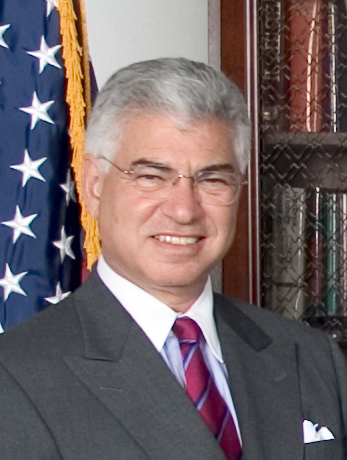
- Born: January 3, 1943 (age 83)
- Education: Muhlenberg College, Columbia Law School, Northwestern University School of Law
- Occupation: Attorney
- Employer: Mayer Brown LLP
- Known for: Watergate prosecutor; Senate Whitewater Committee Chief Counsel (Minority); member, 9/11 Commission
- Title: Partner
- Political party: Democratic
- Awards: The Best Lawyers in America, 1983-2010. Washingtonian Magazine's Top Lawyers in Washington, DC, 1992-2010. LL.D. (honorary), Muhlenberg College, 1975.

Richard Ben-Veniste (born January 3, 1943) is an American lawyer. He was a special prosecutor during the Watergate scandal and later became a member of the 9/11 Commission. He is known for his pointed questions and criticisms of the Bush administration. In 2017, he became a CNN legal analyst.

== Early life and education ==
Ben-Veniste was born to a Jewish family, his father of Levantine origin and his mother of Russian and German origin. He graduated from Stuyvesant High School in New York City in 1960, earned an A.B. from Muhlenberg College in Allentown, Pennsylvania in 1964, an LL.B. from Columbia Law School in New York City (1967), and an LL.M. from Northwestern University School of Law in Chicago in 1968.

== Career ==
Ben-Veniste was an assistant U.S. attorney (1968–1973) in the Southern District of New York, and chief of the Special Prosecutions section, (1971–1973). He became a leading Watergate prosecutor, as chief of the Watergate Task Force of the Watergate Special Prosecutor's Office, (1973–1975).

He was the Democrats' chief counsel (1995–1996) on the Senate Whitewater Committee which investigated a variety of allegations involving Bill and Hillary Clinton. He argued that the Clintons did no wrong in connection with their investment in a failed land development project named Whitewater, or in their other Arkansas business affairs, nor did they commit violations of law after Mr. Clinton became president.

Ben-Veniste was a presidential appointee (2000) to the Nazi War Crimes and Japanese Imperial Government Records Interagency Working Group, which ultimately declassified some 8 million documents relating to war crimes in the World War II and post-war era.

== 9/11 Commission ==
Ben-Veniste was a member (2002) of the 9/11 Commission, where he developed a reputation for asking tough questions and demanding access to sensitive documents, although in some circles he was accused of grandstanding. His interrogation of U.S. Secretary of State Condoleezza Rice was contentious, and led to the declassification of the previously secret August 6, 2001, President's Daily Brief: "Bin Laden Determined to Attack Inside the United States." The 9/11 Commission Report was published in 2004 and has been read by millions of readers worldwide.

Ben-Veniste was a partner of the Washington, D.C., law firm of Melrod, Redman & Gartlan (1975–1981). In 1981 he formed Ben-Veniste and Shennoff, where he practiced for 10 years. He joined Weil, Gotshal and Manges in 1991, where he was a partner until 2002. Ben-Veniste was a partner at Mayer Brown LLP from 2002 until January 2023.

== Works ==
- Richard Ben-Veniste and George Frampton, Stonewall: The Real Story of the Watergate Prosecution Simon & Schuster, 1977, ISBN 0-671-22463-8
- Richard Ben-Veniste, The Emperor's New Clothes: Exposing the Truth from Watergate to 9/11 Thomas Dunne Books, 2009, ISBN 978-0-312-35796-2
