= Robert B. Fiske =

American attorney (1930–2025)

Bob Fiske

United States Attorney for the Southern District of New York
- In office March 1, 1976 – March 2, 1980
- President: Gerald Ford; Jimmy Carter
- Preceded by: Thomas Cahill
- Succeeded by: William Tendy

Personal details
- Born: Robert Bishop Fiske Jr. December 28, 1930 New York City, U.S.
- Died: December 4, 2025 (aged 94) Darien, Connecticut, U.S.
- Party: Republican
- Spouse: Janet Tinsley (m. 1954)
- Children: 3
- Education: Yale University (BA); University of Michigan, Ann Arbor (JD)

Robert Bishop Fiske Jr. (December 28, 1930 – December 4, 2025) was an American trial attorney and a partner with the law firm of Davis Polk & Wardwell in New York City. He was the United States Attorney for the Southern District of New York from 1976 to 1980, where he was known for prosecuting high-profile organized crime cases. In 1994, he was appointed special prosecutor to investigate the Whitewater controversy, before being replaced by Kenneth Starr.

== Background ==
Fiske was born in Brooklyn, New York, on December 28, 1930. He was educated at Yale University as an undergraduate before going on to attend the University of Michigan Law School, following his father's profession as a lawyer.

== Career ==
Fiske began his career at Davis Polk in New York in 1955. From 1957 to 1961, he was an assistant United States Attorney in the Southern District of New York, where he prosecuted organized crime, before returning to private practice. In 1976, President Gerald Ford appointed him United States Attorney for the Southern District of New York, during which he continued to personally appear in court as a prosecutor. Notable cases he led included that of Nicky Barnes, which resulted in a life sentence for Barnes after four previous prosecutions had failed to secure convictions, and that of crime boss and trade unionist Anthony Scotto, who was convicted of racketeering and bribery. He left the post in 1980.

=== Special prosecutor ===
In 1994, U.S. Attorney General Janet Reno appointed Fiske as the special prosecutor to investigate the Whitewater controversy and the death of White House Counsel Vince Foster. At the time of his appointment, Fiske was almost universally praised by members of the Republican Party.

Fiske conducted investigations, and released an interim report on June 30 that in summary concluded that President Bill Clinton and White House officials had not interfered with the Resolution Trust Corporation, which was investigating the failed Madison Guaranty Savings & Loan, a partner of the Whitewater Development Corporation. Fiske's report also concluded that Vince Foster died by suicide. On the same day that Fiske released this report, President Clinton signed the Independent Counsel Reauthorization Act of 1994, effectively abolishing the position of Special Prosecutor and replacing it with the position of Independent Counsel. Under the new law, the Special Division had sole authority to select Independent Counsels.

Janet Reno formally requested that Robert Fiske be chosen, and allowed to continue his investigation. On August 5, the Special Division, headed by Judge David Sentelle of the United States Court of Appeals for the District of Columbia Circuit, decided to replace Fiske with former Washington D.C. Circuit judge Kenneth Starr.

=== Private practice ===
Fiske was a senior law partner at Davis Polk in New York City, where he represented many high-profile clients. He defended the National Football League in an antitrust suit brought by the United States Football League. He represented Clark Clifford and Robert A. Altman, who were top executives of First American bank until they stepped down facing investigations by regulators and prosecutors regarding their roles in the BCCI scandal.

He headed the legal team defending Exxon in New York and New Jersey investigations of the oil spill that dumped 567,000 gallons of oil into Arthur Kill, New Jersey. The deal reached with the state of New Jersey allowed Exxon to plead guilty to a one-count federal misdemeanor and pay a fine over $10 million. Additionally, New York and New Jersey state prosecutors were prevented from seeking indictments and no action was to be taken against the four Exxon officers under investigation. He defended A. Alfred Taubman of Sotheby's, who was charged with conspiring to violate antitrust laws by engaging in price-fixing with rival Christie's. He also defended Sanjay Kumar of Computer Associates International, Inc. who was charged with securities fraud and obstruction of justice.

In 2014, Fiske published a book, Prosecutor, Defender, Counselor: The Memoirs of Robert B. Fiske Jr., chronicling his career.

== Fiske Fellowship at University of Michigan ==
In 2001, Fiske established the Fiske Fellowship at the University of Michigan Law School to support Michigan Law graduates pursuing careers in government service. The fellowship provides stipends and loan assistance for up to four outstanding students meeting eligibility requirements for three-year terms. Fiske believed that having government service experience early in a professional career is a fulfilling path to pursue and wanted to support Michigan Law graduates desiring that direction.

== Education and honors ==
Fiske was a president of the American College of Trial Lawyers and the Federal Bar Council. He was a recipient of the Association Medal from the New York City Bar Association.

An alumnus of the Pomfret School, he had a BA from Yale University (1952), and a JD from the University of Michigan (1955), where he was associate editor of the law review.

== Personal life and death ==
Fiske and his wife, Janet Tinsley Fiske, were childhood sweethearts. They were married for 71 years. They had three children. His brother, John Fiske, is a mediation lawyer in Boston, and he was predeceased by another brother, McNeil Fiske, who had been an executive at First National Bank of Denver.

An avid outdoorsman, sports fan and athlete, Fiske was especially passionate about Michigan and Yale athletics, attending many games in person. He completed the New York Marathon, and participated in the Pan Mass Challenge and RAGBRAI multi-day bike across Iowa. He continued to play tennis weekly into his 94th year. Throughout his life, he enjoyed sailing, boating, fishing, hiking, cross country skiing and many other outdoor activities with his family and friends.

Fiske died from pancreatic cancer at his home in Darien, Connecticut, on December 4, 2025, at the age of 94.
