= Bruce Lindsey =

American lawyer

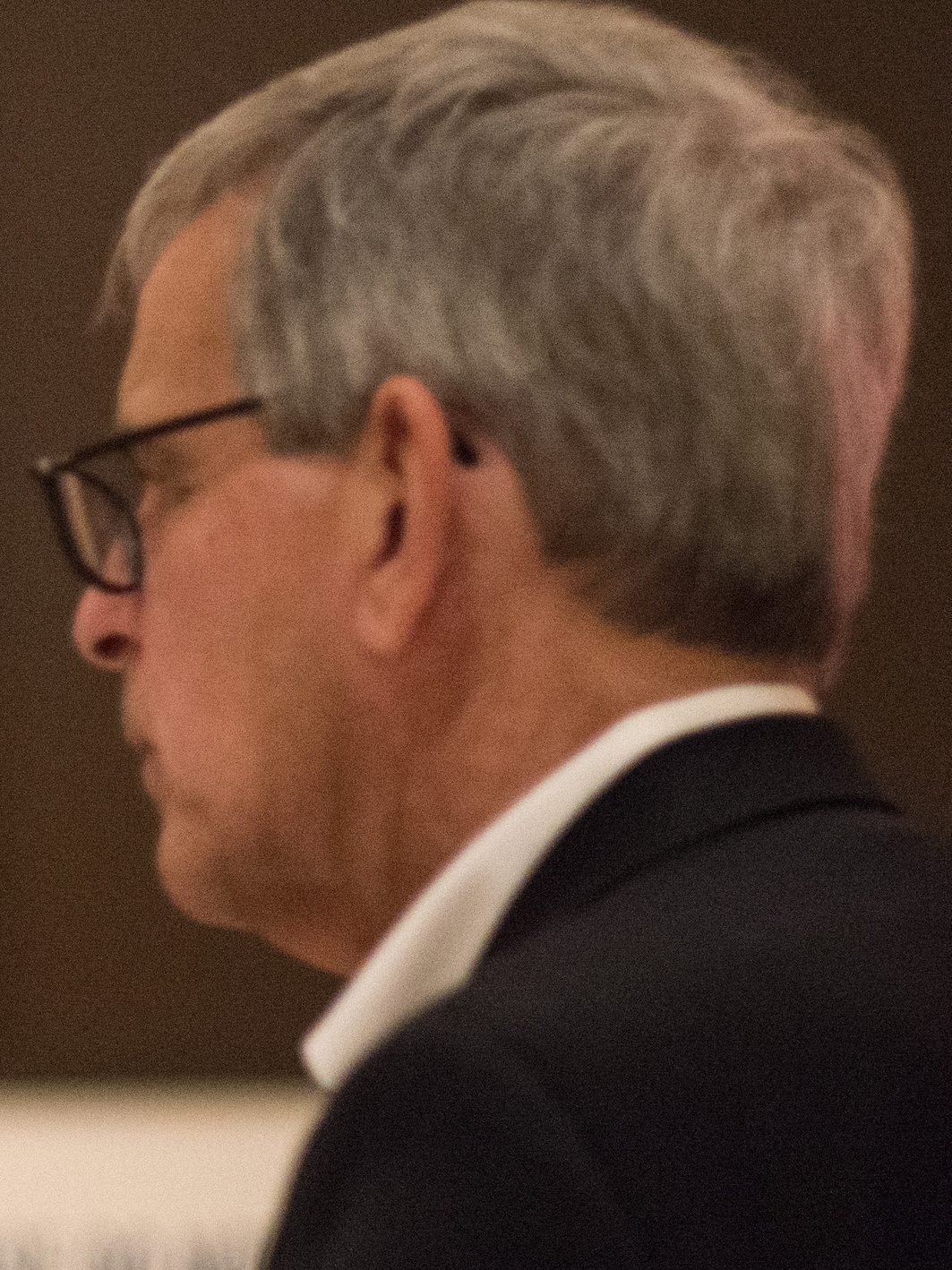
- Lindsey in 2016

Director of the White House Presidential Personnel Office
- In office January 20, 1993 – April 1995
- President: Bill Clinton
- Preceded by: Constance Horner
- Succeeded by: Bob Nash

Personal details
- Born: 1950 or 1951 (age 74–75)
- Party: Democratic
- Spouses: Beverly Lindsey; Hallie Lindsey
- Children: 2 daughters
- Education: Rhodes College (BA); Georgetown University (JD)

Bruce R. Lindsey (born 1948) is an American lawyer and non-profit executive. He served in the White House during the Presidency of Bill Clinton. He was named in a lawsuit during the Whitewater controversy, and he testified before a grand jury regarding the sexual misconduct allegations surrounding Bill Clinton in the run-up to his impeachment. He was a partner of Wright, Lindsey & Jennings, a Little Rock, Arkansas-based law firm, and served as chairman of the Clinton Foundation.

== Early life ==
Lindsey received a bachelor's degree from Rhodes College (formerly Southwestern at Memphis) and a JD from Georgetown University Law Center. He was admitted to the Arkansas Bar in 1975 and the D.C. Bar in 1999.

== Career ==
Lindsey worked for Senator J. William Fulbright in 1968. It was then that he first met Bill Clinton. From 1979 to 1981, he served as Legislative Director to former United States Senator David Pryor. Lindsey subsequently became a partner at Wright, Lindsey & Jennings, a law firm in Little Rock, Arkansas, where he is currently of counsel.

During Bill Clinton's 1992 Presidential campaign, Lindsey served as the National Campaign Director. During the eight years of the Clinton Administration, he served as an Assistant to the President, Senior Advisor, and Deputy White House Counsel. In 1993, Lindsey was also Director of the Office of Presidential Personnel where he supervised the selection and approval of political appointees in the Cabinet departments and to presidential boards and commissions.

In 1996, in the midst of the Whitewater controversy, Lindsey was named as an "unindicted co-conspirator" in a lawsuit involving Herby Branscum Jr. and Robert M. Hill, the co-owners of the Arkansas-based Perry County Bank, which financed Clinton's fifth gubernatorial campaign in 1990. When the bankers were cleared, his case fell into abeyance. By 1998, in the midst of the Bill Clinton sexual misconduct allegations, which led to his impeachment, Lindsey was subpoenaed by Ken Starr and testified before the grand jury on the suspicion that he silenced Clinton's alleged victims.

Lindsey joined the Foundation in 2001 as general counsel and served as CEO from 2003 to 2013 splitting his time between the Foundation's New York and Little Rock offices. He currently serves as a member of its Board of Directors.

== Personal life ==
Lindsey was formerly married to Beverly H. Lindsey. They have two daughters, Katherine Gates Lindsey and Sarah Elizabeth Lindsey. Since 2006, he has been married to Hallie W. Lindsey.
