= David Hale (Whitewater) =

American judge

David Hale is a former Arkansas municipal judge and banker. His allegations of criminal behavior resulted in the Whitewater scandal trials.

== Biography ==
He worked with Jim McDougal on $3 million in loans from a lending company he ran. He pleaded guilty and went to jail for conspiring to defraud the Small Business Administration in looting the funds from a dummy business that he had established. He was sentenced to two years and four months in prison for fraud unrelated to the Whitewater deal. As part of his guilty plea for looting money from an insurance company, he provided the allegations for the Whitewater scandal and testimony for its investigators.

He testified in the trial of Jim and Susan McDougal in 1989 when the Madison Guaranty Savings and Loan originally failed, and at the time, he never mentioned Clinton in a detailed account of the $300,000 loan. It was only when Hale came under indictment on other charges that he alleged any crime by Clinton.

Hale testified in U.S. District Court that (then) Governor Bill Clinton pressured him to make a fraudulent $300,000 loan for him not be named in the loan. On June 23, 1994, Eugene Fitzhugh pleaded guilty to trying to bribe Hale.

== See also ==
- Floyd Brown
- David Bossie
- James D. Johnson
