= Webster Hubbell =

American judge

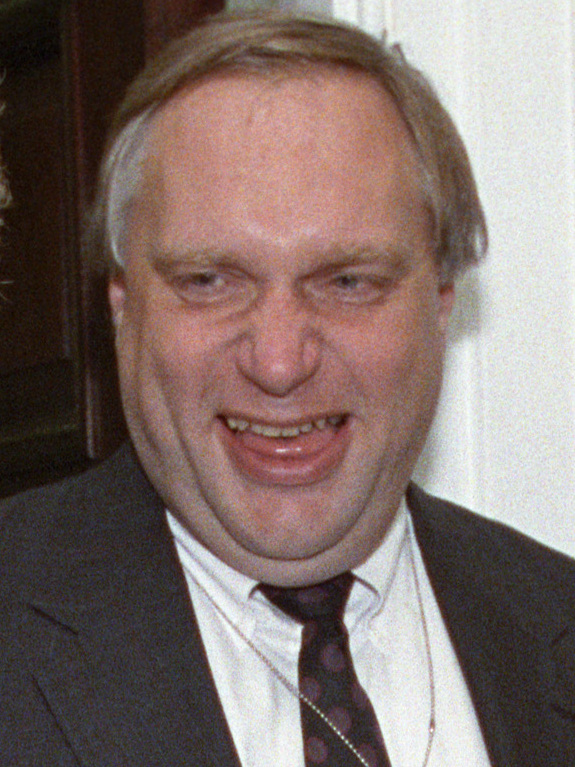
- Hubbell in 1993

9th United States Associate Attorney General
- In office 1993–1994
- President: Bill Clinton
- Preceded by: Wayne Budd
- Succeeded by: John Schmidt

64th Mayor of Little Rock
- In office June 1979 – July 1981
- Preceded by: A. M. "Sandy" Keith
- Succeeded by: Charles E. Bussey

Personal details
- Born: Webster Lee Hubbell; January 18, 1948 (age 78) Little Rock, Arkansas, U.S.
- Party: Democratic
- Spouse: Suzanna Ward
- Children: 4
- Education: University of Arkansas (BA, JD)

Webster Lee "Webb" Hubbell (born January 18, 1948) is a former United States Associate Attorney General from 1993 to 1994 who as part of the Whitewater controversy pled guilty to one count of wire fraud and one count of failing to disclose a conflict of interest, and was sentenced to 21 months in prison.

== Early life and education ==
Born and raised in Little Rock, Arkansas, Webster Hubbell was a three-sport letterman at Hall High School. He attended the University of Arkansas on a football scholarship where he played offensive tackle for the Arkansas Razorbacks. In his senior year (1968/69), the Razorbacks were SWC co-champions and beat undefeated Georgia in the Sugar Bowl. Hubbell was selected in the eighth round (197th overall) in the 1969 NFL draft by the Chicago Bears, but an injury ended his football career. He graduated from the University of Arkansas with a degree in Electrical Engineering in 1970, then graduated with a Juris Doctor degree from the University of Arkansas School of Law with honors.

== Career ==
Hubbell began the practice of law with the Rose Law Firm in 1973, where in February 1977 Hillary Clinton joined him as a law partner. In September 1978 he was appointed to Little Rock's City Board of Directors, and in 1979 he was elected Mayor of Little Rock. He served in that position until 1981. Hubbell was re-elected to the City Board of Directors in 1980 where he served until he resigned in 1984 to become the chief justice of the Arkansas Supreme Court.

After his service on the Court, he returned to the Rose Law Firm where he remained until he left for Washington, D.C. in January 1993. Hubbell was active in community affairs including, serving as president of the Visiting Nurses Association, on the Board and Treasurer of the Arkansas Arts Center, on the board of the UAMS Foundation, and as chairman of the board of the Arkansas State Board of Bar Examiners.

=== Federal government career ===
After the 1992 election, Hubbell was one of the Clinton Administration transition's senior officials, Counsel to the Transition Board and responsible for vetting appointments to the Cabinet and other top positions, among others George Stephanopoulos, Henry Cisneros, and Jim Woolsey, former head of the Central Intelligence Agency and Bernard W. Nussbaum, White House Counsel.

After Clinton's inauguration, Hubbell became White House liaison to the United States Department of Justice, arriving at Justice on January 20, 1993. During the period before an Attorney General was approved, Hubbell worked as the assistant to the Attorney General, but reported to Republican appointee, Acting Attorney General Stuart M. Gerson. Clinton considered Hubbell for the Attorney General position on January 30, 1993, after Zoë Baird's name was withdrawn, but Clinton nominated Janet Reno instead.

Hubbell was formally nominated as Associate Attorney General on April 2, 1993, and was immediately attacked for his ties to the Clintons. Hubbell's nomination was nonetheless quickly confirmed by the U.S. Senate and he served as Associate Attorney General until April 1994. He oversaw all the civil divisions of the U.S. Department of Justice, the Immigration and Naturalization Service, and was appointed by Janet Reno as the Chief Operating Officer of department and its 100,000 employees and $10 billion budget.

==== Resignation and conviction ====
During the Whitewater controversy, Hubbell was indicted for allegedly overbilling clients while in private practice. Hubbell had previously resigned as associate attorney general on April 14, 1994, to avoid controversy regarding his work at Justice and in hopes of reaching a resolution with the Rose Law Firm. In December 1994 Hubbell pleaded guilty to one count of wire fraud and one count of tax fraud and on June 28, 1995, Judge George Howard sentenced Hubbell to 21 months' imprisonment. As a convicted felon, Hubbell entered Federal Correctional Institution, Cumberland in August 1995, and was released from a halfway house in February 1997.

In 1997, William Morrow & Co published Friends in High Places, Hubbell's autobiographical account of his rise in Arkansas politics and his time in the Clinton administration.

== Additional criminal charges ==
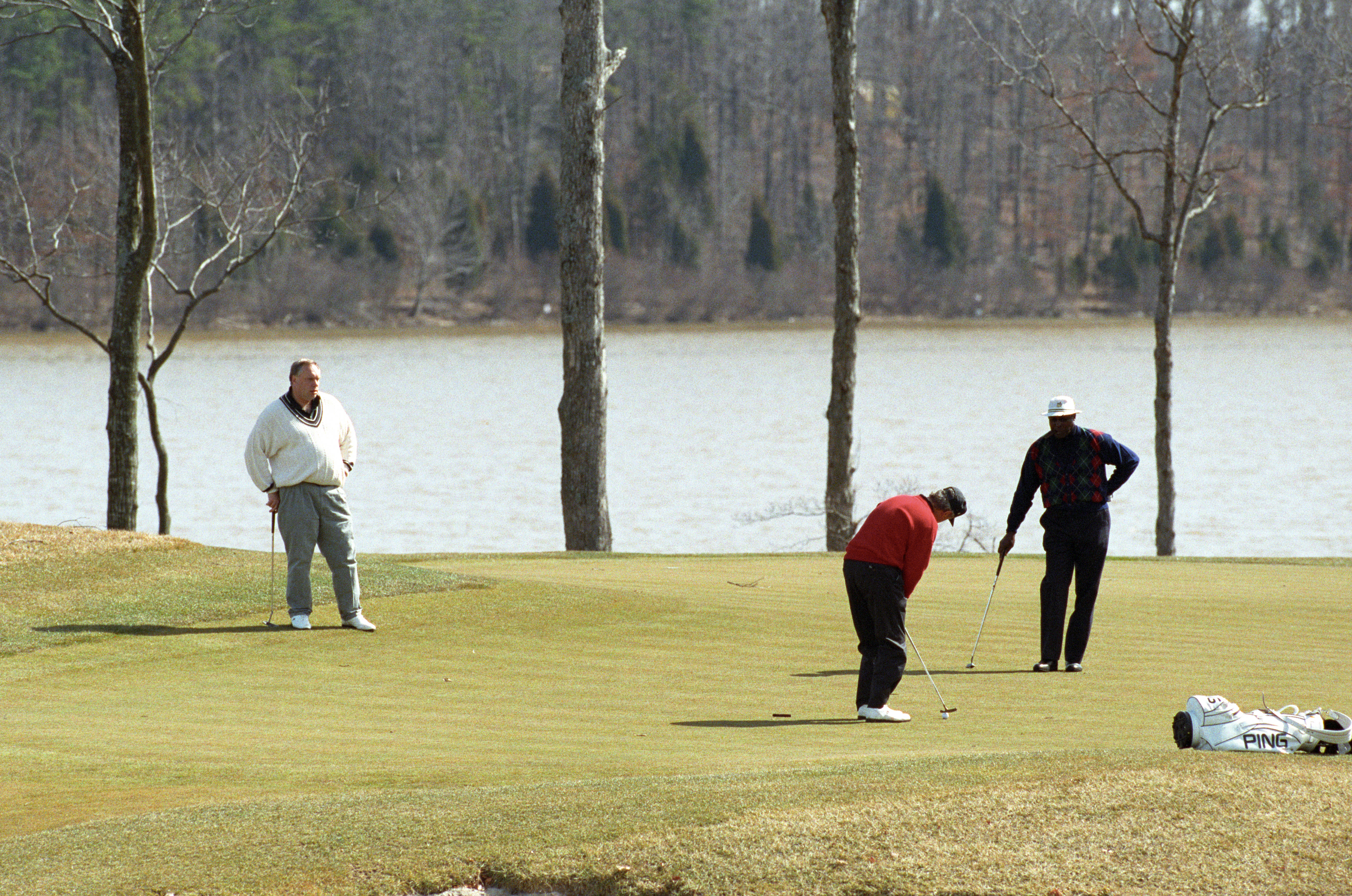
President Bill Clinton playing golf with Hubbell and Vernon Jordan at Robert Trent Jones Golf Club in Virginia in 1993.

During the months after Hubbell's resignation, he entered into legal consulting contracts with several clients including the Indonesian Riady family and Revlon. This activity became the focus of another Starr investigation while Hubbell served out his sentence. Despite years of investigation, and although Independent Counsel Starr alleged that Hubbell "did little or no work for the money paid by his consulting clients", Starr ultimately concluded there was insufficient evidence to prove that any legal consulting contract or payments were intended to influence Hubbell's cooperation with investigators in the Whitewater investigation.

Starr and his prosecutors were convinced that Hubbell knew all the Clintons' secrets that were under investigation and that, if pressured enough, Hubbell would tell all. On April 30, 1998, Hubbell and his wife were indicted for conspiracy, tax evasion and mail fraud. Hubbell had, in the course of Starr's investigation, provided documents as part of an immunity agreement with the Independent Counsel about his consulting agreements. Despite this agreement, Starr used this information to obtain an indictment of Hubbell, his wife, his accountant and his tax lawyer.

District Judge James Robertson dismissed the charges against Hubbell and his wife on July 1, 1998, ruling that Independent Counsel Kenneth Starr had overstepped his authority in bringing the Hubbell indictment. Judge Robertson ruled that Starr had violated Hubbell's Fifth Amendment rights against self-incrimination by building a case that relied on materials collected under an immunity agreement with Hubbell. Starr appealed to the Court of Appeals and Judge Robertson was affirmed. Starr then appealed to the United States Supreme Court. In an 8–1 decision (with Chief Justice William H. Rehnquist the lone dissenter), the Supreme Court also ruled in favor of Hubbell.

On November 14, 1998, Starr obtained a third indictment, this time alleging that Hubbell had committed fraud and given false testimony to the House Banking Committee and federal banking regulators. On June 30, 1999, the day Starr was required to step down as Independent Counsel, Hubbell entered into a plea agreement resolving the indictments. Hubbell pleaded guilty to one charge of failing to disclose a potential conflict of interest from ten years earlier. He was sentenced to one year of probation; in exchange, the prosecutor dropped charges against Hubbell's wife, lawyer, and accountant, and Starr agreed not to bring further charges against him.

== Life after prison ==
During the six years of Starr's investigation, Hubbell worked for criminal justice think tank NCIA. Afterwards, Hubbell worked as an independent legal consultant, general counsel for an Internet start-up, and general counsel and senior vice-president for a large commercial insurance company until July 2010. After a liver transplant instigated by a rare form of hepatitis, he moved to Charlotte, North Carolina, where he now writes novels. His first novel, When Men Betray, was released in May 2014 by Beaufort Books. He has since written Ginger Snaps and A Game Of Inches, also published by Beaufort.

== Personal life ==
Hubbell and his wife, Suzy, have four children and seven grandchildren. They moved in 2010 from Washington, D.C. to Charlotte, where Suzy is a realtor/broker.

Legal offices
Preceded by Wayne Budd	United States Associate Attorney General; 1993–1994	Succeeded by John R. Schmidt
