= Bernard Nussbaum =

American attorney (1937–2022)

White House Counsel
- In office January 20, 1993 – March 8, 1994
- President: Bill Clinton
- Preceded by: Boyden Gray
- Succeeded by: Lloyd Cutler

Personal details
- Born: Bernard William Nussbaum; March 23, 1937 New York City, U.S.
- Died: March 13, 2022 (aged 84) New York City, U.S.
- Party: Democratic
- Spouses: Toby Sheinfeld (m. 1963; died 2006) Nancy Kuhn (m. 2008; died 2021)
- Children: 3, including Emily
- Education: Columbia University (BA); Harvard University (JD)

Bernard William Nussbaum (March 23, 1937 – March 13, 2022) was an American attorney, best known for having served as White House Counsel under President Bill Clinton.

== Background ==
Nussbaum, the first child of Jewish immigrants from Poland, was born in New York City on March 23, 1937. His father and mother originally worked in garment factories. His father was later employed by the labor union that represented garment workers, the International Ladies' Garment Workers' Union (ILGWU). Nussbaum grew up on the Lower East Side of Manhattan, home at the time to many immigrant families from Eastern Europe.

He attended neighborhood public schools. In 1951, he was admitted to Stuyvesant High School, a specialized public high school in New York City which requires the passing of an entrance exam for admission. He graduated in 1954, having been a member of the school's academic honor society, and an editor on the school's newspaper, the Stuyvesant Spectator.

Nussbaum then was accepted at Columbia College in New York. He was awarded scholarships by New York State and by Columbia which made it possible for him to attend Columbia. He joined the staff of the college daily newspaper, the Columbia Daily Spectator and, in his senior year, became its editor-in-chief. He was also elected to Phi Beta Kappa. During the summer months he worked as a waiter at hotels in the Pocono Mountains in Pennsylvania and the Catskill Mountains in New York to help pay for his education.

In 1958, Nussbaum graduated from Columbia and was admitted to Harvard Law School. After his first year, on the basis of his academic record, he was selected to join the Harvard Law Review and was given a full tuition scholarship by the law school. In his senior year he became a note editor of the Law Review, succeeding future Supreme Court justice Antonin Scalia.

Upon completing law school in 1961, Nussbaum was awarded a Harvard University Sheldon Traveling Fellowship. This fellowship enabled him to travel around the world for a year visiting over 30 countries. On his return he served for six months on active duty in the United States Army and was a member of the Army Reserves for six years.

== Early career ==
In 1962, he was sworn in as an Assistant United States Attorney in the Southern District of New York, in the office led by Robert Morgenthau. He was a federal prosecutor for more than three years and tried a number of major criminal cases. These included convicting, after a four-month trial, five officials of a federal savings and loan association of perjury. The perjury was committed by the bank officers to cover up the diversion of over $250,000 from the savings and loan association to finance a political campaign for Congress being conducted by the president of the association. He also won a jury verdict convicting a prominent accountant and investor of bribing and conspiring (with other major investors) to bribe an internal revenue agent.

In 1966, Nussbaum joined the New York law firm, Wachtell, Lipton, Rosen & Katz, one year after the firm was founded in January 1965 by Martin Lipton, Herbert Wachtell, Leonard Rosen, and George Katz, four lawyers in their early 30s who in time became preeminent in the legal profession. In 1966, the firm had less than 10 lawyers. As of 2022, it has over 250 lawyers and is one of the most successful corporate law firms in the United States.

In 1968, Nussbaum ran for a seat in the New York State Assembly. In a close contest, in a Democratic primary election in Brooklyn, New York, he lost to the incumbent assemblyman.

In 1970, Nussbaum managed Robert Morgenthau's campaign for Governor of New York. He led a group of former assistant United States attorneys in conducting a statewide petition drive to place Morgenthau's name on the Democratic Party primary ballot for the party's nomination for governor, opposing Arthur Goldberg, the former Supreme Court Justice, who was the choice of the Democratic Party leaders.

In a short period of time, well over 15,000 signatures of registered Democrats were collected in over 50 New York counties, with the requirement that there be at least 100 such valid signatures in each county. Many of the upstate counties in New York had few residents and even fewer registered Democrats. This made the petition drive difficult. However, it succeeded and Morgenthau began his primary race against Goldberg. A third political party, the Liberal Party, then decided to give its nomination to Goldberg. This decision, which would have had the effect of splitting the vote against the incumbent governor, Nelson Rockefeller, if Morgenthau won the Democratic primary, made it virtually impossible for Morgenthau to defeat Rockefeller in the general election. Morgenthau therefore withdrew from the primary race. Goldberg ran as the Democratic/Liberal candidate against Rockefeller in the general election and was defeated.

In 1972, Nussbaum represented Elizabeth Holtzman who, in a surprise victory, had defeated senior U.S. Representative Emanuel Celler, who at the time was chairman of the House Judiciary Committee, by a little over 600 votes in the Democratic primary election. Celler brought suit in a Brooklyn state court to set aside that victory. Nussbaum won that case, which was ultimately decided by the New York State Court of Appeals, and Holtzman's election was upheld. As a result of that victory, Peter Rodino, a senior congressman from New Jersey replaced Celler and became chairman of the Judiciary Committee which later successfully conducted the impeachment inquiry involving U.S. President Richard Nixon.

In the mid-1970s, during New York City's fiscal crises, Nussbaum represented the Comptroller of the City of New York. At the time the comptroller, along with the mayor and the city, were the subject of an investigation by the United States Securities and Exchange Commission into whether there was fraud in the sale of city securities. After a lengthy inquiry, during which numerous documents were produced and top city officials testified, there was no finding of any wrongdoing.

While in private practice he also served as a member of the adjunct faculty of Columbia Law School, conducting a seminar in trial practice for third year law students.

== Nixon impeachment inquiry ==
In December 1973, Nussbaum left his law firm to serve as a senior member on the House Judiciary Committee's impeachment inquiry staff, led by John Doar, which conducted the impeachment investigation involving President Richard Nixon. Nussbaum participated in overseeing the fact gathering process. This included analyzing the White House tape recordings made by President Nixon, and interviewing significant witnesses such as John Dean, the President's former White House Counsel, John Mitchell, the former U.S. Attorney General in the Nixon administration, and Charles Colson, a former special assistant to the President. He played a role in presenting the results of the staff's inquiry to the House Judiciary Committee. In July 1974, the committee, in a bi-partisan vote, voted to recommend to the House of Representatives that the President be impeached. Shortly thereafter, on August 9, 1974, President Nixon resigned. At the conclusion of the impeachment inquiry Nussbaum rejoined his law firm.

While serving on the Judiciary Committee staff, Nussbaum met and worked with Hillary Rodham, a recent law school graduate who was also a member of the staff. She introduced him to the man she would marry in 1975, Bill Clinton.

== White House Counsel under President Clinton ==
In 1993, Nussbaum again left his law firm, when he was appointed Counsel to the President of the United States. During his tenure as President Bill Clinton's first White House Counsel he was involved in major personnel and policy issues facing the administration. These included the appointment of Janet Reno as Attorney General, the recruitment of a new FBI director, and the selection of approximately 100 federal judges, including Judge Ruth Bader Ginsburg to the Supreme Court of the United States.

He was also involved in handling the early stages of the Whitewater controversy, an investigation into an unsuccessful Arkansas real estate investment made by the Clintons years earlier, and the investigation of the suicide of his deputy, Vincent Foster. Contrary to the advice of others on the White House staff, in the administration, and in Congress, Nussbaum strongly urged the President not to seek the appointment of an independent counsel with respect to those matters. He maintained there was no legal basis for such an appointment, as there was no evidence of wrongdoing by the President, either before or after he entered office. He warned the president that the institution of an independent counsel, who is responsible to no one, tends to become an uncontrolled, never ending effort to find wrongdoing even where none exists. He predicted that conservative judges would replace anyone who was appointed by the Attorney General with a choice more to their liking. He predicted the investigation would likely last as long as the President was in office and beyond. Consequently, he argued, despite media and congressional pressure, in addition to their being no legal basis, it also made no political sense to request such an appointment.

The President, nonetheless, in response to media and congressional pressure, decided to ask the Attorney General to appoint an independent counsel and she did. A few months later, as predicted by Nussbaum, three appellate judges replaced the counsel appointed by the Attorney General with Ken Starr. An investigation then took place which never resulted in criminal charges against the President, but lasted for over seven years, until after the end of the Clinton presidency. It did, however, result, based on subsequent personal conduct (involving a White House intern) separate from the Whitewater matter, in Clinton being impeached by the House of Representatives in December 1998. He was ultimately acquitted by the Senate, but the impeachment proceeding subsequently affected future presidential elections, first involving Vice President Al Gore and later Hillary Clinton.

In his memoir My Life, published after he left office, President Clinton said the single biggest error he made as president was not listening to Nussbaum and, instead, requesting the appointment of an Independent Counsel. He wrote: "It was the worst presidential decision I ever made, wrong on the facts, wrong on the law, wrong on the politics, wrong for the presidency, and the Constitution."

Referring to media criticism of Nussbaum's advice, the President wrote "there would have been no investigation, subpoenas, or grand jury if I had listened to him and refused to give into the demands for an independent counsel to 'clear the air.' Bernie's real offense was that he thought I should abide by the rule of law and accepted standards of propriety, rather than the constantly shifting standards of the Whitewater media, which were designed to produce the very results they professed to deplore."

Nussbaum resigned on March 5, 1994, as a result of the Whitewater controversy and the position he took regarding the appointment of an Independent Counsel. President Clinton later wrote: "Bernie Nussbaum resigned in early March; he never got over my foolish decision to ask for an independent counsel, and he didn't want to be a source of further problems ... [he was an] able, honest public servant."

Nussbaum returned to his law firm in late 1994 and resumed the private practice of law.

== Allegations of obstruction of justice ==
After the suicide of Vince Foster the justice department and the United States Park Police sought papers found in Foster's briefcase that Nussbaum refused to hand over to both the department and the police.

During the investigation into the travel office firings Nussbaum refused to hand over Foster's travel office notebook to Congress and the FBI.

== Later career ==
Over the years, as a senior litigation partner at Wachtell Lipton, Nussbaum represented clients such as major corporate entities, law firms, law firm partners, government officials, political figures, and the judiciary.

Working together with his firm's partners and associates, Nussbaum was the lead trial lawyer in many cases tried in various state and federal courts around the country, including significant corporate cases won by his firm. Among the cases he took on were representing United Technologies Corporation in defeating an antitrust suit brought by the U.S. Department of Justice and Carrier Corporation in a New York federal court which sought to prevent United from acquiring Carrier. He represented the Hilton Corporation in a Nevada federal court and obtained an injunction preventing ITT Corporation from blocking a takeover effort. He won a judgment in Delaware Chancery Court on behalf of IBP Corporation ordering Tyson Foods to consummate a multi-billion merger between IBP and Tyson, which Tyson had agreed to but was seeking to avoid. In a South Carolina state court he defeated an effort by Jack Kent Cooke to take over Multimedia, Inc. a local owned broadcast and newspaper enterprise.

In 2004, Nussbaum won a jury verdict in a New York federal court on behalf of the developer of the rebuilt World Trade Center, Larry Silverstein, against major insurance companies. After a trial lasting more than a month, the jury found that the September 11 attacks in 2001, when two towers were struck by two planes, was not a single event, as claimed by the insurance companies, but was, under the terms of the insurance agreements then in force, two separate events. This significantly increased the insurance payments due and resulted in a multi-billion payment to the developer for the rebuilding of the center.

In the course of his career, Nussbaum was asked to represent major law firms (including Sullivan and Cromwell and Shearman and Sterling) in lawsuits brought against them or certain of their partners. Their suits were resolved in favor of his law firm clients.

He represented a senior partner of the Simpson Thacher law firm who was charged with diverting fees owed to the firm. His client ultimately pleaded guilty and cooperated with law enforcement authorities. After lower court hearings and an appeal, a prison term which had been imposed was set aside and his client was not required to serve any time in prison.

In 1992, in a case which generated one of the most prominent legal ethics controversies of the decade, Nussbaum represented the law firm of Kaye Scholer. A government agency sued Kaye Scholer charging it with improperly withholding damaging information about its client, a large federal savings and loan association whose failure epitomized the savings and loan disaster in the early 1990s. The law firm vehemently denied it did anything wrong in representing its client; it maintained it had an obligation to represent its client zealously and not to disclose information harmful to its client.

At the outset of the lawsuit, the government froze all the assets of Kaye Scholer. This freeze rapidly put the firm close to collapse. It made it virtually impossible to contest the government's action as the firm would likely not survive in the interim as clients and employees would depart. At this point Nussbaum was retained to represent Kaye Scholer. In less than a week, a settlement was reached which did not require an admission of wrongdoing by the firm and provided for a monetary payment over time which was covered by insurance. This enabled the firm to continue as a law firm.

As a result of judicial salaries in New York being frozen for more than a decade (the legislature refused to raise judicial salaries unless its own salaries were raised and the Governor of New York refused to agree to legislative salaries being raised), Nussbaum represented the Chief Judge of the State of New York and the Judiciary of the State, without fee, in successful constitutional litigation ultimately decided by the state's highest court, the New York State Court of Appeals.

The Court of Appeals ruled that holding judicial salaries hostage to legislative salaries was unconstitutional. As a consequence, the Legislature and the Governor agreed to change the system for the compensation of judges. Since then, decisions regarding judicial salaries are made every four years by an independent commission rather than by the executive and legislative branches. Salaries of state court judges have been significantly increased to approximate the salaries of federal judges, which, before the lawsuit was brought, were considerably higher than state court judges. They are now roughly equal.

On January 28, 2011, Nussbaum sent a letter to President Barack Obama stating that while serving as White House Counsel he extensively reviewed the Jonathan Pollard file. After pleading guilty in June 1986, Pollard was sentenced to an unprecedented life sentence for providing classified information to Israel without the intention to harm the United States. In his letter to President Obama, Nussbaum wrote: "Pollard has been appropriately punished for his conduct, and a failure at this time to commute his sentence would not serve the course of justice; indeed, I respectfully believe it would be a miscarriage of justice." After serving 30 years in prison, Pollard was granted parole and was released from prison on November 20, 2015.

== Other public roles and honors ==
Nussbaum was the recipient of awards from charitable and educational institutions as well as legal organizations. In 1993, he was awarded an honorary LL.D. from the George Washington University National Law Center. He served as Vice President of the New York City Bar Association and as President of the Federal Bar Council, a bar association whose membership consists of lawyers and judges who practice primarily in federal courts within the Second Circuit. He was a Fellow of the American College of Trial lawyers, a select professional association of trial lawyers from the United States and Canada.

Nussbaum was a member of philanthropic boards of trustees, including Brandeis University and the Jewish Theological Seminary. He served as a trustee of the Boys Brotherhood Republic (now part of the Henry Street Settlement), a self-governing youth club on the Lower East Side of Manhattan. Created in the 1930s, Nussbaum was a member of that club as a child.

Nussbaum also served on the Board of Trustees of The Mount Sinai Medical Center in New York City which encompasses seven major hospitals in New York City and a highly regarded medical school. He was a member of the board's audit committee and legal committee. He was also a member of a three-person independent review board appointed in 2014 by the Brooklyn District Attorney. The board reviews decisions made by the district attorney's office as to whether certain individuals have been wrongly convicted of crimes. That process resulted in a number of convictions being set aside and persons being released from prison.

== Personal life ==
In January 2006, his wife Toby, to whom he was married for 42 years, died of pancreatic cancer. They met in 1958 when she was an undergraduate at Brandeis University and he was a first year law student at Harvard. Throughout her adult life she was active in political, community, and philanthropic affairs, particularly with non-profit organizations in the Jewish community.

In December 2008, Nussbaum married Nancy Kuhn, who had been a fundraiser for political and charitable organizations. Among other political races, she played an important role in raising funds, in New York State and elsewhere, for the Democratic presidential candidate Walter Mondale during the 1984 campaign. Nussbaum and Kuhn resided in Manhattan, Stamford, Connecticut, and Naples, Florida. Kuhn died of brain cancer in April 2021.

He had three children: a daughter, Emily Nussbaum (who is married to Clive Thompson and is on the staff of The New Yorker magazine; she was the magazine's television critic and won both the 2016 Pulitzer Prize for Criticism and the National Magazine Award for Columns and Commentary); two sons, Peter Nussbaum (married to Alexis Tannenbaum), Frank Nussbaum (married to Carlye Adler) and a stepson, William Kuhn. He also had six grandchildren.

Nussbaum died from heart disease at his home in Manhattan on March 13, 2022, at the age of 84.

== See also ==
- List of Jewish American jurists

Legal offices
| Preceded by Boyden Gray | White House Counsel; 1993–1994 | Succeeded by Lloyd Cutler |
