= Rose Law Firm =

American law firm

- Headquarters: Little Rock, Arkansas
- No. of offices: 2
- No. of attorneys: 55 as of 2023
- No. of employees: About 80 as of 2008
- Major practice areas: General practice, corporate
- Revenue: about $10 million
- Date founded: November 1, 1820
- Founder: Robert Crittenden; Chester Ashley
- Company type: Professional association
- Website: www.roselawfirm.com

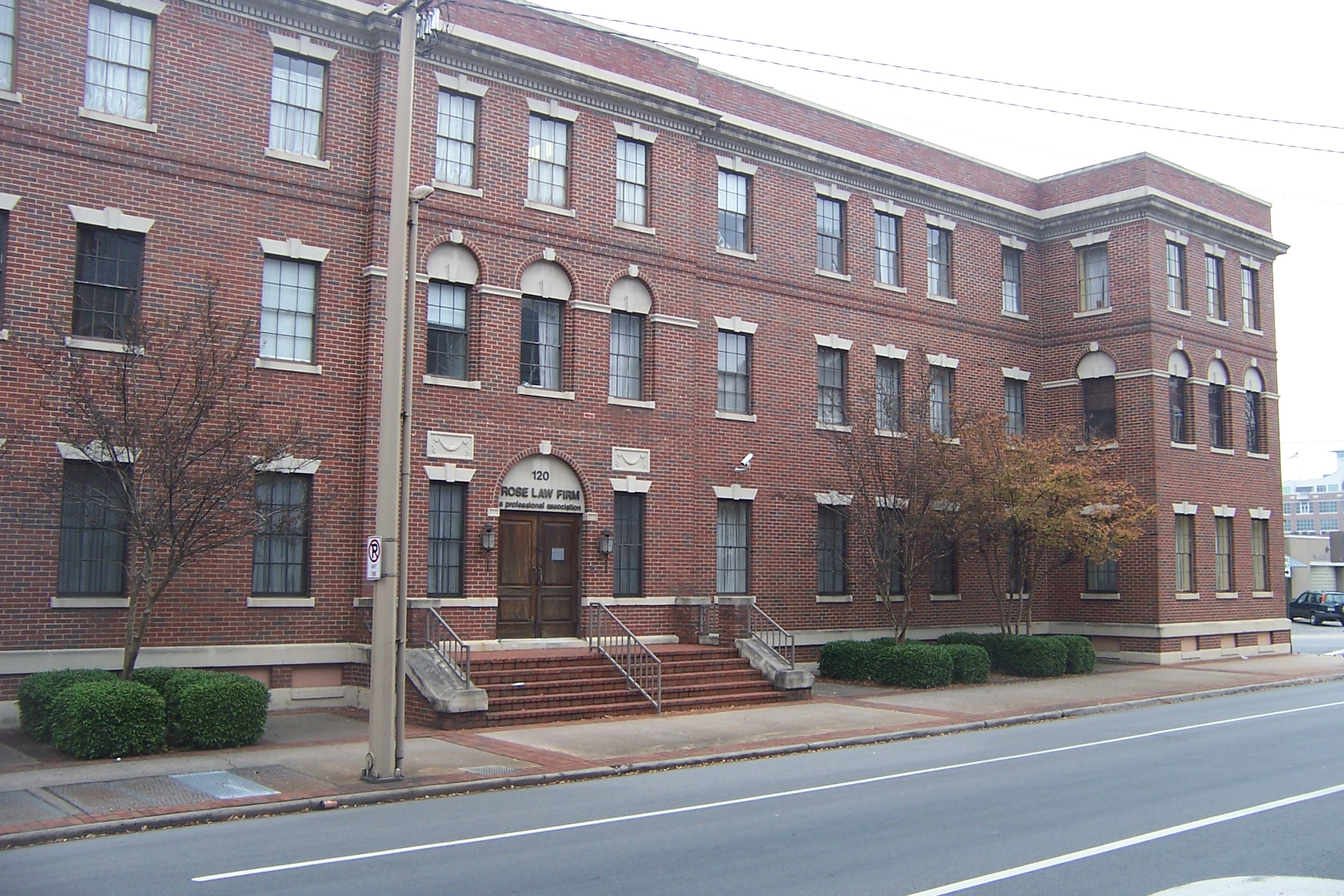
The old entrance of Rose Law Firm (older building)

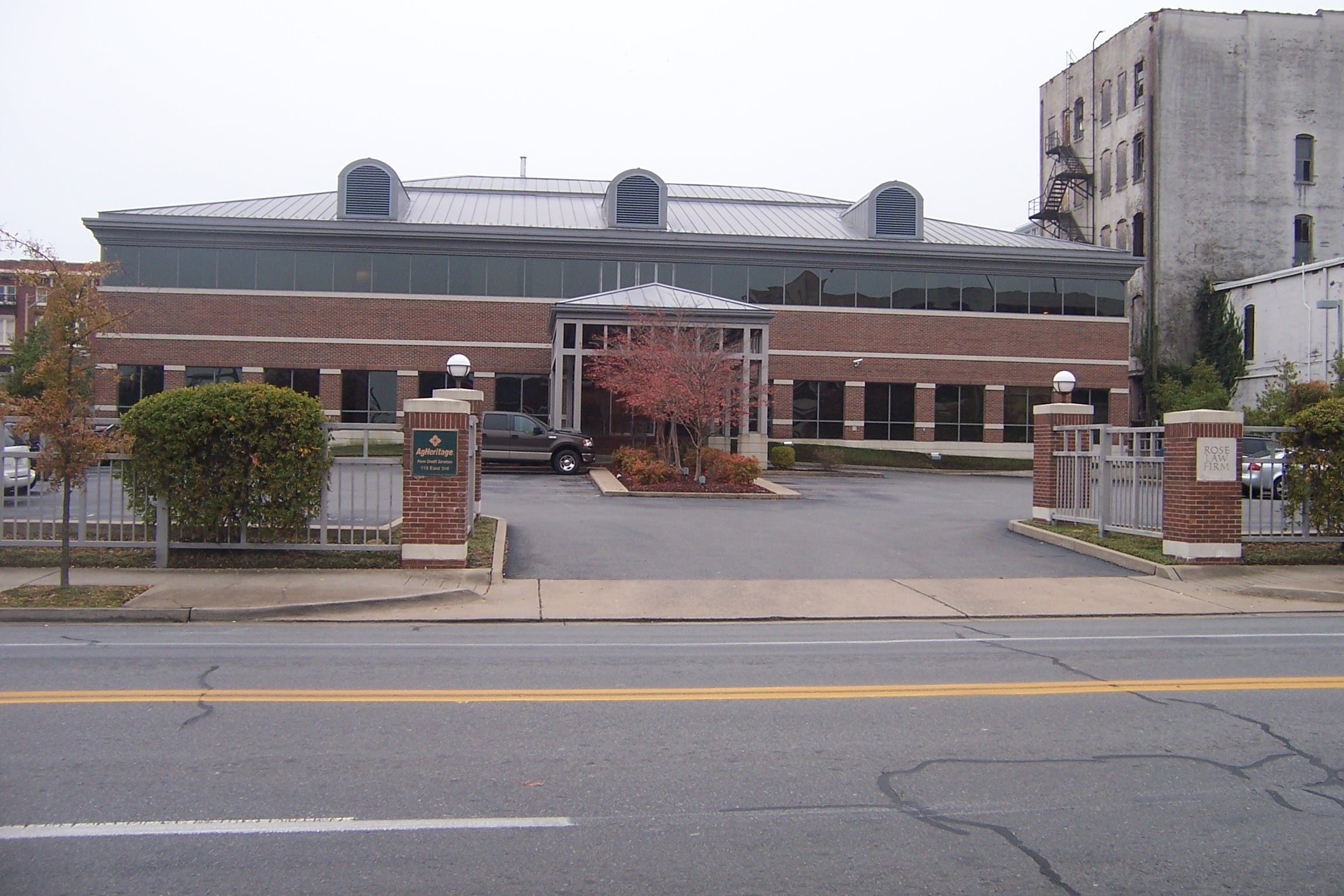
The current entrance of the firm; it shares the newer building with AgHeritage, a farm credit services cooperative.

Rose Law Firm is an American law firm headquartered in Little Rock, Arkansas.

It dates its origins to November 1, 1820, sixteen years before Arkansas statehood, when Robert Crittenden, born 1797, and Chester Ashley, born 1791, entered into an agreement for a "Partnership in the Practice of Law". As such, it is the third oldest law firm in the United States and the oldest west of the Mississippi River. It is also the oldest company of any kind in Arkansas.

In 2018, the firm elected its first female managing member. In 2020, the firm celebrated its 200th birthday.

== History ==
=== Early history – 1820–1865 ===
The Rose Law Firm dates its formation to the 1820 partnership of Crittenden and Ashley, whose handwritten law partnership agreement hangs in the Rose boardroom. Robert Crittenden served as Arkansas' territorial governor and negotiated Arkansas' admission to the United States as the 25th state in 1836. Chester Ashley served as a United States Senator from Arkansas. Between 1837 and 1844, when Ashley was elected to the U.S. Senate, Ashley was Watkins' law partner. Ashley's "original partnership with the well-connected Robert Crittenden had dissolved over political differences." Watkins' previous partnership, with James Curran, begun in 1844, had ended with Curran's death in 1854 (Watkins, a widower, married Curran's widow). Watkins was Arkansas Attorney General from 1848 to 1851; "however, his primary focus continued to be his private practice." From 1853 to 1854 Watkins was Chief Justice of the Arkansas Supreme Court and did not practice law. Curran's death led him to resign from his position, to take care of his law practice.

=== Rose years – 1865–1905 ===
Although the firm has changed its name a number of times, the first Rose family member to be associated with the firm occurred in 1865, when newly-arrived U. M. Rose formed a law partnership with George Claiborne Watkins. In 1881 the firm name became U.M. Rose and Geo. B. Rose, George being Uriah's son. In 1893 W.E. Hemingway joined the firm, which became Rose, Hemingway & Rose. In 1905 the firm merged with Cantrell and Loughborough.

Rose Law Firm members have historically been active in politics and civic affairs. U.M. Rose co-founded the American Bar Association and served as its president in 1901–1902. Rose was later appointed the American representative to the Second Hague Peace Conference and was instrumental in drafting the Hague Convention. Six of the firm's members have served on the Arkansas Supreme Court (three as Chief Justice), and six members have also served as President of the Arkansas Bar Association. Rose Law Firm members have served as Commissioner of the Uniform Commission on State Laws, President of the National Association of Bond Lawyers and President of the Arkansas Bar Association.

=== Modern history – 1905–present ===
By the late 1970s, the firm had nine partners and a long name – Rose, Nash, Williamson, Carroll, Clay, & Giroir. The firm simplified its name to Rose Law Firm in 1980.

In the economic realm, Rose has been termed "the ultimate establishment law firm" in the state and "the legal arm of the powerful". During the 1970s, for example, its clients included Tyson Foods, Wal-Mart, large brokerage Stephens Inc., and Worthen Bank, as well as the Arkansas Democrat and other Hussman family media holdings. Hillary Rodham became the firm's first female associate, and soon its first female partner, during her husband Bill Clinton's tenure as Arkansas Attorney General and Governor of Arkansas. Webster Hubbell, Vince Foster, and William H. Kennedy, III were also partners, before becoming Assistant Attorney General, Deputy White House Counsel, and Associate White House Counsel in the Clinton administration, respectively. In all, the firm grew five times in size between the early 1970s and early 1990s. According to a 1994 article, "Among Arkansas firms, Rose is viewed as the whitest of the white shoes. It is dominated by white men, most of whom came from privileged families in the state and graduated from one of the two accredited law schools in the state. Only a handful of women, and no blacks, have been made partners."

Rose Law Firm entered the national news during the 1990s as part of the Whitewater controversy, as investigators sought to determine how much work Clinton had done for the firm while representing Jim McDougal in cases involving the latter's Madison Guaranty and Castle Grande enterprises.

The firm's Little Rock building consists of both an old red brick structure, which was converted from a YMCA facility and has hardwood floors and an indoor swimming pool, and a connected newer structure. A second office in Fayetteville, Arkansas was opened in 2017 when the members of the Henry Law Firm, which specialized in intellectual property law, were absorbed into the firm.

== Affiliations ==
Rose Law Firm is the Arkansas member of two law firm affiliate groups: State Capital Law Group and Lex Mundi.
