= United States Senate Whitewater Committee =

The Senate Whitewater Committee, officially the Special Committee to Investigate Whitewater Development Corporation and Related Matters, was a special committee convened by the United States Senate during the Clinton administration to investigate the Whitewater controversy.

Whitewater congressional hearings began on August 2, 1994. The committee was created by S.Res. 120 on May 17, 1995, and approved by the Senate, 96-3. Hearings ran for 300 hours over 60 sessions across 13 months, taking over 10,000 pages of testimony and 35,000 pages of depositions from almost 250 people, and culminating in an 800-page final majority report on June 18, 1996.

The hearings did not receive much public interest: they were televised on C-SPAN, not the major networks; they were reported on in daily newspapers, but rarely made evening newscasts; media critics rated the hearings a "snooze" - and there were few dramatic moments of testimony, as D'Amato and Chertoff were unable to find any "smoking guns" for their case.

Some key figures of the Senate Whitewater Committee were:

- Al D'Amato (Republican - New York), chair
- Paul Sarbanes (Democratic - Maryland), ranking member
- Michael Chertoff - majority (Republican) counsel
- Richard Ben-Veniste - minority (Democratic) counsel
