= Susan McDougal =

American real estate investor (born 1955)

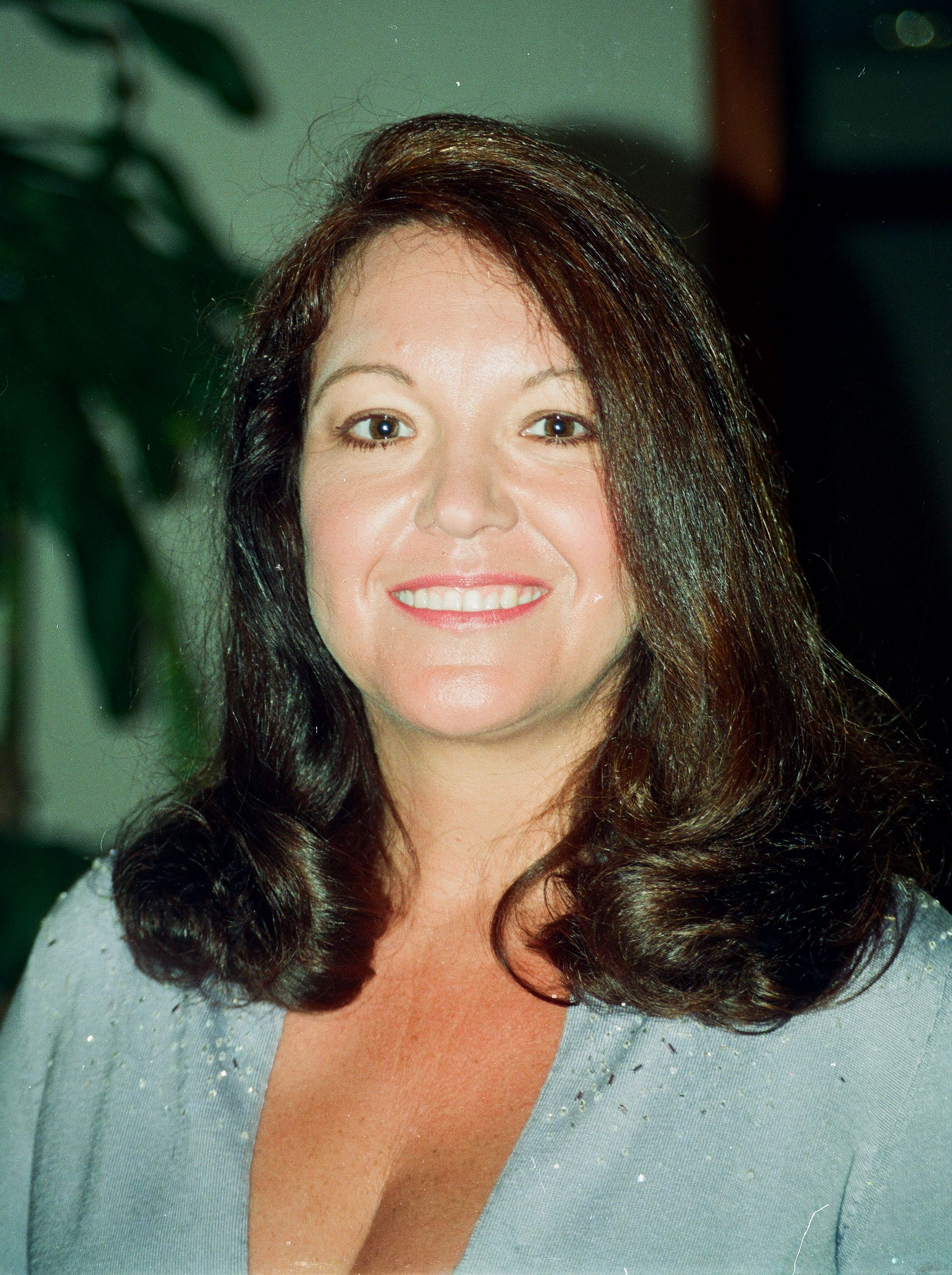
- McDougal in 1999
- Born: Susan Carol Henley; June 27, 1955 (age 71); Heidelberg, West Germany
- Occupation: Businesswoman
- Spouse: Jim McDougal (m. 1976; div. 1990)

Susan Carol McDougal (née Henley; born June 27, 1955) is an American real estate investor who served prison time as a result of being convicted of fraud in the Whitewater controversy.

Her refusal to answer three specific questions for a grand jury, regarding on whether President Bill Clinton lied in his testimony during her Whitewater trial, led McDougal to receive a jail sentence of 18 months for contempt of court. That sentence made up most of the total 22 months she spent incarcerated.

She received a full pardon from Clinton in the final hours of his presidency in January 2001.

== Early life ==
McDougal was born as Susan Carol Henley in Heidelberg, West Germany, the daughter of James B. Henley and Laurette (Mathieu) Henley. In 1976, Susan married Jim McDougal. In the 1980s, the McDougals were partners with Bill Clinton and Hillary Clinton in the failed Whitewater controversy real estate venture.

McDougal separated from her husband in the late 1980s and moved to Los Angeles. There, from 1989 to 1992, she worked as a personal assistant to former actress Nancy Kovack, the wife of conductor Zubin Mehta. In late 1993, McDougal was charged with embezzling money from the Mehtas and began preparing her defense against the charges. After being released from prison in the Whitewater matter, her embezzlement trial in California began. In 1998, McDougal was acquitted on all 12 counts. A suit in 1999 against Kovack for malicious prosecution was settled out of court.

== Whitewater ==
On August 5, 1994, Kenneth Starr became Independent Counsel and would prosecute McDougal and other Whitewater participants. Her federal trial began in 1996, in which the government's star witness, Arkansas banker and former municipal judge David Hale, claimed that President Bill Clinton had discussed an illegal $300,000 loan with him and McDougal years earlier, while Clinton was Governor of Arkansas. Hale was himself under investigation for having defrauded the SBA out of $3.2 million. He also unsuccessfully sought to have his brother Milas Hale corroborate his testimony against Clinton.

McDougal was convicted on all 4 counts of fraud in her role in the Whitewater case and for receiving the fraudulent loan on May 28, 1996, and was sentenced to spend two years in prison for four counts of fraud and conspiracy, but her prison term did not begin until March 7, 1998, as there were other court proceedings. Following her ex-husband James (Jim) B. McDougal's conviction but prior to his sentencing, he began to co-operate with the Office of Independent Counsel and tried to persuade her to do likewise to avoid a prison sentence.

== Grand jury ==
During the grand jury, McDougal stated her full name "for the record" and then refused to answer any questions. In her book, she explained, "I feared being accused of perjury if I told the grand jury the truth. The OIC had accepted David Hale's lies as the truth. They were also now relying on Jim McDougal's lies, which they'd carefully helped him construct. If I came in and directly contradicted those two – whose testimony had been used to convict me of four felonies – I feared the OIC would next accuse me of perjury." She also writes that she feared the same fate as Julie Hiatt Steele, who had contradicted the testimony of White House aide Kathleen Willey: "Simply telling the truth cost Steele everything she had, almost landed her in jail [for perjury], and jeopardized her custody of her adopted son."

McDougal's grand jury testimony included her response: "Get another independent counsel and I'll answer every question." She was publicly rebuked for refusing to answer "three questions" about whether President Clinton had lied in his testimony during her Whitewater trial, particularly when he denied any knowledge of an illegal $300,000 loan. U.S. District Court Judge Susan Webber Wright sentenced her for civil contempt of court.

== Prison ==
From September 9, 1996, to March 6, 1998, McDougal spent the maximum possible 18 months imprisonment for civil contempt, including eight months in solitary confinement, and she was subjected to "diesel therapy," described by McDougal as "the practice of hauling defendants around the country and placing them in different jails along the way."

McDougal was shuffled from Arkansas to Los Angeles to the Federal Transfer Center, Oklahoma City, and then on to the Pulaski County Jail in Little Rock, Arkansas.

Following her release on March 7, 1998, for civil contempt of court, McDougal began serving the two-year sentence for her 1996 conviction.

Soon afterward, the Independent Counsel indicted McDougal on criminal charges of contempt of court and obstruction of justice. After serving four months on the Whitewater fraud conviction, she was released for medical reasons.

After McDougal's release, her embezzlement trial in California began. In 1998, McDougal was acquitted on all 12 counts.

In the early 1990s McDougal worked as a personal assistant to retired actress Nancy Kovack, who later accused McDougal of embezzlement. McDougal was acquitted on all charges and responded with a suit for malicious prosecution which was settled out of court.

McDougal's trial for criminal charges of contempt of court and obstruction of justice began in March 1999. The jury deadlocked 7–5 on the charge of contempt of court and found her not guilty on the charge of obstruction of justice. In January 2001, in the final hours of his presidency, President Clinton granted McDougal a full pardon.

== Recent life ==
Following prison, she became an advocate for prison reform. She served as a chaplain of the University of Arkansas for Medical Sciences in Little Rock.

== See also ==
- List of people pardoned by Bill Clinton
- The Hunting of the President
