= Criminal referral =

Notice recommending criminal investigation

A criminal referral or criminal recommendation is a notice to a prosecutorial body, recommending criminal investigation or prosecution of one or more entities for crimes which fall into that body's jurisdiction.

In the U.S. federal government, regulatory and law enforcement agencies that investigate crimes must typically refer cases to the Department of Justice for prosecution at its discretion. These referrals may not require formal documentation, but may include a case report. In a direct referral, agencies refer cases to the U.S. Attorney in the district where the crime occurred. The United States Congress and its members, in their investigative role, issue criminal referrals to the Justice Department as well.

State attorneys general often refer federal crimes to the Justice Department. Investigative bodies under the Justice Department itself may also issue referrals to U.S. Attorneys, such as the case against Michael Cohen in the Southern District of New York, which was referred by the Mueller investigation.

Private counsel may also make criminal referrals on behalf of clients who have been victims of both civil and criminal wrongdoing.

In some states, state attorneys general must receive a criminal referral from the state executive before pursuing criminal charges.
