= Madison Guaranty =

American savings and loan association

Madison Guaranty Savings and Loan Association
- Company type: Joint-stock company
- Industry: Banking
- Founded: 1979; 47 years ago
- Defunct: March 2, 1989; 37 years ago
- Fate: Bank failure
- Headquarters: Little Rock, Arkansas
- Owner: Jim McDougal

Madison Guaranty Savings and Loan Association was a savings and loan association based in Little Rock, Arkansas. The company operated from 1979 until 1989 when it was shut down by federal regulators as a result of bank failure, leading to a loss of $60 million for the Federal Deposit Insurance Corporation. Beginning in 1982, the bank was owned and managed by Jim McDougal, a friend of Bill Clinton and Hillary Clinton. On March 8, 1992, during the 1992 United States presidential election the bank was the subject of an article in The New York Times by Jeff Gerth, which linked the bank to Whitewater Development Corporation, owned by McDougal and the Clintons. After Clinton's election as president, the bank was the subject of investigations by the United States Congress and special prosecutor Ken Starr as part of the Whitewater controversy. McDougal was investigated to determine if he improperly diverted money from the bank to Whitewater or the Clinton campaign during the Arkansas gubernatorial election, 1984.

== History ==
In 1979, the bank received a state savings and loan charter from Arkansas as Woodruff County Savings and Loan in Augusta, Arkansas. From June 1979 to December 1981, assets grew from $2.6 million to $3.8 million.

In April 1982, an audit by the Federal Home Loan Bank Board, the bank's regulator, found substantial losses and questioned the solvency of the bank. Later in 1982, Madison was acquired by Jim McDougal and Steve Smith. John Latham was named chief executive officer. The bank continued its rapid growth, increasing in assets from $6.7 million at the end of 1982 to $48.6 million in 1986. In 1983, McDougal and his wife, Susan McDougal, took control of the institution.

In a 1984 audit, federal regulators found the bank was making unsound loans and noted that if paper losses were realized, Madison would be insolvent.

In August 1986, the Federal Home Loan Bank Board ordered McDougal's removal from management of Madison, although he remained its owner. Robert W. Palmer, an appraiser, admitted to falsifying appraisals.

In 1986, the assets of the bank peaked at $125.5 million.

On March 2, 1989, Madison was seized by Federal regulators and put into receivership with the Federal Savings and Loan Insurance Corporation as receiver.

On April 14, 1997, Jim McDougal was convicted of 18 felony counts of fraud conspiracy charges as a result of bad loans made by Madison. He was sentenced to 3 years in prison and payment of $4.27 million in restitution to the Small Business Administration and the Federal Deposit Insurance Corporation.

Madison Guaranty and McDougal hired the Rose Law Firm, where Mrs. Clinton worked, as a defense attorney. Mrs. Clinton's billing records on Madison Guaranty and McDougal's Castle Grande real estate development project could not be found. How much work she actually did on Madison and Castle Grande was the subject of the missing billing records. McDougal also held a fundraiser at Madison Guaranty that paid off Clinton's campaign debt of $50,000. Madison cashier's checks accounted for $12,000 of the funds raised. On January 4, 1996, Clinton's billing records were found on a table in the White House, which showed that she performed a mere 60 hours of legal work for Madison in 1985 and 1986.
