= United States Department of Justice Office of Special Counsel =

Former US government office

The Office of Special Counsel was an office of the United States Department of Justice established by provisions in the Ethics in Government Act that expired in 1999. The provisions were replaced by Department of Justice regulation 28 CFR Part 600, which created the successor office of special counsel. The current regulations were drafted by former acting solicitor general Neal Katyal.

The independent counsel was an independent prosecutor—distinct from the attorney general of the United States Department of Justice—who provided reports to the United States Congress under 28 U.S.C. § 595.

== History ==
In 1978, a Democratic Party-majority Congress was determined to curb the powers of the president and other senior executive branch officials due in part to the Watergate scandal and related events such as the Saturday Night Massacre. They drafted and passed the Ethics in Government Act of 1978, creating a special prosecutor (later changed to independent counsel) position, which could be used by Congress or the attorney general to investigate individuals holding or formerly holding certain high positions in the federal government and in national presidential election campaign organizations.

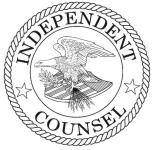

The prosecutor, who was appointed by a special panel of the United States Court of Appeals for the District of Columbia Circuit, could investigate allegations of any misconduct, with an unlimited budget and no deadline, and could be dismissed only by the attorney general for "good cause" or by the special panel of the court when the independent counsel's task was completed. The president could not dismiss those investigating the executive branch. It was felt that the independence of the office would ensure impartiality of any reports presented to Congress. However, there have been critics of this law including Supreme Court Justice Antonin Scalia. Many argued the new independent counsel's office was a sort of "fourth branch" of government that had virtually unlimited powers and was answerable to no one. However, the constitutionality of the new office was ultimately upheld in the 1988 Supreme Court case Morrison v. Olson.

Previously under the Independent Counsel Reauthorization Act of 1994, United States Attorney General Janet Reno had Donald Smaltz appointed Independent Counsel by the United States Court of Appeals for the District of Columbia (Division for the Purpose of Appointing Independent Counsels Ethics in Government Act of 1978, As Amended, Division 94-2) on September 9, 1994, to "investigate to the maximum extent authorized by law" whether the US Department of Agriculture Secretary Mike Espy "committed a violation of any federal criminal law . . . relating in any way to the acceptance of gifts by him from organizations or individuals with business pending before the Department of Agriculture." Smaltz was also given jurisdiction to investigate "other allegations or evidence of violations of any federal criminal law by organizations or individuals developed during the course of the investigation of Secretary Espy and connected with or arising out of that investigation."

The most famous independent counsel was Kenneth Starr, whose report led to the impeachment of President Bill Clinton by the United States House of Representatives, though he was later acquitted by the United States Senate.

Three independent counsel investigations had jurisdictions that were specified in regulations: the Iran–Contra investigation in 1987 (28 Code of Federal Regulations sec. 601.1); Edwin Meese III, the Wedtech case in 1987 (sec. 602.1), and President Bill and First Lady Hillary Clinton in the Madison Guaranty/Whitewater case in 1994 (sec. 603.1).

After the expiration of the Ethics in Government Act in 1999, the Office of Independent Counsel was replaced with the Office of Special Counsel, defined by regulation 28 CFR 600, which in turn is based on congressional statute 28 USC 510.

Patrick Fitzgerald was appointed Special Counsel in 2003 regarding the investigation into the public naming of CIA spy Valerie Plame. His appointment was based on 28 USC 510.

Under 28 CFR 600, Robert Mueller was appointed Special Counsel in 2017 to investigate possible interference by the Russian government in the 2016 presidential election, including a possible criminal conspiracy between Russia and the presidential campaign of Donald Trump. The investigation was officially concluded on March 22, 2019. The report concluded that the Russian Internet Research Agency's social media campaign supported Trump's presidential candidacy while attacking Clinton's, and Russian intelligence hacked and released damaging material from the Clinton campaign and various Democratic Party organizations. The investigation "identified numerous links between the Russian government and the Trump campaign", and determined that the Trump campaign "expected it would benefit electorally" from Russian hacking efforts. However, ultimately "the investigation did not establish that members of the Trump campaign conspired or coordinated with the Russian government in its election interference activities". Mueller later said that the investigation's conclusion on Russian interference "deserves the attention of every American".

In 2019 Attorney General William Barr appointed a federal prosecutor, John Durham, to counter-investigate the origins of the FBI's Crossfire Hurricane probe. On December 1, 2020, the Associated Press reported that Barr had appointed Durham as a special counsel under the federal statute governing such appointments to conduct an investigation into "…the investigation of Special Counsel Robert S. Mueller III," by which was meant the FBI personnel who worked on Crossfire Hurricane before joining the Mueller team.

== Timeline ==
- Originally created by the Ethics in Government Act of 1978 and the Ethics in Government Act Amendments of 1982 (96 Stat. 2039), January 3, 1983
- Reauthorized for five years by the Independent Counsel Reauthorization Act of 1987 (101 Stat. 1293), December 15, 1987
- Lapsed, December 15, 1992, by failure of reauthorization
- Reinstituted by the Independent Counsel Reauthorization Act of 1994 (PL 103-270), June 30, 1994
- Converted into the Office of the Special Counsel end of 1999.

== Investigations carried out by independent counsel ==
Name	Start	End	Topic	Appointer
John Henderson	June 1, 1875	December 10, 1875	Whiskey Ring	Ulysses Grant (President)
James Broadhead	January 1876	March 1876	Whiskey Ring	Ulysses Grant (President)
William Cook	June 1881	September 1882	Star Route scandal	James Garfield (President)
Holmes Conrad	June 1903	June 1904	Bribery at the United States Post Office Department	Teddy Roosevelt (President)
Charles Bonaparte	June 1903	June 1904	Bribery at the United States Post Office Department	Teddy Roosevelt (President)
Francis Heney	October 1903	January 1, 1905	Oregon land fraud scandal	Philander Knox (Attorney General)
Atlee Pomerene	February 16, 1924	June 1931	Teapot Dome scandal	Calvin Coolidge (President)
Owen Roberts	February 18, 1924	June 2, 1930	Teapot Dome scandal	Calvin Coolidge (President)
Newbold Morris	February 1, 1952	April 3, 1952	DOJ corruption allegations	Howard McGrath (Attorney General)
Archibald Cox	May 18, 1973	October 20, 1973	Watergate scandal	Elliot Richardson (Attorney General)
Leon Jaworski	November 1, 1973	October 25, 1974	Watergate scandal	Bob Bork (Acting Attorney General)
Hank Ruth	October 25, 1974	October 17, 1975	Watergate scandal	William Saxbe (Attorney General)
Chuck Ruff	October 17, 1975	June 20, 1977	Watergate scandal	Edward Levi (Attorney General)
Arthur Christy	November 29, 1979	May 28, 1980	Allegations of illegal drug use of Jimmy Carter's aide Hamilton Jordan	DC Circuit Court
Paul Curran	March 23, 1979	October 16, 1979	Carter business loans	Griffin Bell (Attorney General)
Gerald Gallinghouse	September 9, 1980	March 1981	Allegations of illegal drug use of Jimmy Carter's aide Timothy Kraft	DC Circuit Court
Leon Silverman	December 29, 1981	September 13, 1982	Raymond Donovan's connections to organized crime	DC Circuit Court
Jacob Stein	April 2, 1984	September 21, 1984	Ed Meese financial improprieties	DC Circuit Court
Jim McKay	April 23, 1986	May 29, 1986	Ted Olson obstruction of Congress's Superfund investigation	DC Circuit Court
Alexia Morrison	May 29, 1986	March 14, 1989	Ted Olson obstruction of Congress's Superfund investigation	DC Circuit Court
Mike Seymour	May 29, 1986	August 6, 1989	Michael Deaver conflict of interest and lobbying	DC Circuit Court
Lawrence Walsh	December 19, 1986	August 4, 1993	Iran-Contra affair	DC Circuit Court
Carl Rauh	December 19, 1986	March 30, 1987	Lawrence Wallace's personal tax matters	DC Circuit Court
James Harper	August 17, 1987	December 18, 1987	Lawrence Wallace's personal tax matters	DC Circuit Court
Jim McKay	February 3, 1987	September 1988	Wedtech scandal	DC Circuit Court
Unknown	May 31, 1989	August 23, 1989	Under seal	DC Circuit Court
Arlin Adams	March 1, 1990	May 1995	Samuel Pierce's mismanagement and fraud of programs at the U.S. Department of Housing and Urban Development	DC Circuit Court
Larry Thompson	July 3, 1995	October 27, 1998	Samuel Pierce's mismanagement and fraud of programs at the U.S. Department of Housing and Urban Development	DC Circuit Court
Unknown	April 19, 1991	July 15, 1992	Under seal	DC Circuit Court
Nicholas Bua	November 14, 1991	March 1993	Inslaw scandal	Bill Barr (Attorney General)
Malcolm Wilkey	March 20, 1992	December 17, 1992	House banking scandal	Bill Barr (Attorney General)
Frederick Lacey	October 16, 1992	December 8, 1992	Iraqgate	Bill Barr (Attorney General)
Joe diGenova	December 14, 1992	January 11, 1996	Improper search of Bill Clinton's passport records by George H. W. Bush administration staff on behalf of his 1992 presidential reelection campaign	DC Circuit Court
Michael Zeldin	January 11, 1996	August 12, 1998	Improper search of Bill Clinton's passport records by George H. W. Bush administration staff on behalf of his 1992 presidential reelection campaign	DC Circuit Court
Bob Fiske	January 24, 1994	August 5, 1994	Suicide of Vince Foster, the Whitewater scandal, Travelgate, Filegate, and later the Clinton-Lewinsky scandal	Janet Reno (Attorney General)
Ken Starr	August 5, 1994	September 11, 1998	Suicide of Vince Foster, the Whitewater scandal, Travelgate, Filegate, and later the Clinton-Lewinsky scandal	DC Circuit Court
Robert Ray	September 11, 1998	March 13, 2002	Suicide of Vince Foster, the Whitewater scandal, Travelgate, Filegate, and later the Clinton-Lewinsky scandal	DC Circuit Court
Julie Thomas	March 13, 2002	September 30, 2004	Suicide of Vince Foster, the Whitewater scandal, Travelgate, Filegate, and later the Clinton-Lewinsky scandal	DC Circuit Court
Don Smaltz	September 9, 1994	October 25, 2001	Allegations of corrupt gratuity by Mike Espy	DC Circuit Court
David Barrett	May 24, 1995	January 19, 2006	Henry Cisneros payments controversy	DC Circuit Court
Daniel Pearson	July 6, 1995	November 14, 1996	Commerce Department trade mission controversy	DC Circuit Court
Curtis von Kann	November 27, 1996	December 19, 1997	Eli Segal's conflicts of interest	DC Circuit Court
Carol Elder Bruce	March 19, 1998	August 22, 2000	Bruce Babbitt and allegations of public corruption surrounding the Department of Interior's denial of a casino contract to an Indian Nation and the truth or falsity of testimony to a Senate Committee concerning the official conduct	DC Circuit Court
Ralph Lancaster	May 26, 1998	April 5, 2000	Charges of influence-peddling and the solicitation of illegal campaign contributions against Alexis Herman	DC Circuit Court
John Danforth	September 9, 1999	November 8, 2000	Waco siege	Janet Reno (Attorney General)
Patrick Fitzgerald	December 30, 2003	March 6, 2008	Plame affair	Jim Comey (Deputy Attorney General)
Bob Mueller	May 17, 2017	May 29, 2019	Investigation into possible interference by the Russian government in the 2016 presidential election, which include a possible criminal conspiracy between the Russian government and the presidential campaign of Donald Trump	Rod Rosenstein (Deputy Attorney General)
John Durham	October 19, 2020	May 15, 2023	Counter-investigation of the origins of the FBI's Crossfire Hurricane probe	Bill Barr (Attorney General)
Jack Smith	November 18, 2022	January 10, 2025	Donald Trump's attempts to delay the certification of the 2020 United States presidential election and his mishandling of files recovered during the FBI search of Mar-a-Lago	Merrick Garland (Attorney General)
Robert K. Hur	January 12, 2023	February 5, 2024	Investigation of the Joe Biden classified documents incident	Merrick Garland (Attorney General)
David Weiss	August 11, 2023	January 17, 2025	Hunter Biden scandal	Merrick Garland (Attorney General)

== See also ==
- Mueller special counsel investigation
