= Jacob Corman =

Jacob Corman could refer to:

- Doyle Corman (Jacob Doyle Corman Jr.) (1932–2019), American politician
- Jake Corman (Jacob Doyle Corman III) (born 1964), American politician, son of Doyle Corman
