= Swidler =

The state of a regenerating limb while partially completed.

Swidler can refer to:

- Leonard Swidler (born 1929) is an American theologian.
- Swidler Berlin Shereff Friedman LLP was a Washington, D.C.–based law firm.
- Swidler & Berlin v. United States was a case in which the Supreme Court of the United States held that the death of an attorney's client does not terminate the attorney-client privilege.
