= Robert Ray (prosecutor) =

American lawyer

Independent Counsel for the Whitewater Scandal
- In office October 18, 1999 – March 13, 2002
- Preceded by: Ken Starr
- Succeeded by: Julie Thomas

Personal details
- Born: Robert William Ray; April 4, 1960 (age 66) Frankfurt, West Germany
- Party: Republican
- Spouse: Jade Cantor
- Education: Princeton University (BA); Washington and Lee University (JD)

Robert William Ray (born April 4, 1960) is an American lawyer. As the successor to Ken Starr as the head of the Office of the Independent Counsel (1999 to 2002) he investigated and issued the final reports on the Whitewater controversy, the White House travel office controversy, and the White House FBI files controversy. Before that he was Deputy Independent Counsel investigating former Secretary of Agriculture Mike Espy and before that Assistant United States Attorney for the Southern District of New York.

== Education ==
Ray received his A.B. from Princeton University in 1982, and his Juris Doctor cum laude from the Washington and Lee University School of Law in 1985.

== Career ==
After graduating from law school, Ray was a clerk for Frank Altimari, a Judge on the United States Court of Appeals for the Second Circuit.

Under independent counsel Donald Smaltz, he prosecuted Mike Espy, and then worked under Ken Starr.

He was an unsuccessful candidate for a non-partisan school board in Brooklyn, New York 1993 and 1996, on the "children's slate." He was briefly a candidate in the 2002 United States Senate elections in New Jersey.

In 2020, he served on President Donald Trump's legal defense team before his first impeachment trial.
