= Swidler & Berlin v. United States =

- Supreme Court of the United States

Argued June 8, 1998 Decided June 25, 1998
- Full case name: Swidler & Berlin and James Hamilton, Petitioners v. United States
- Citations: 524 U.S. 399 (more) 118 S. Ct. 2081; 141 L. Ed. 2d 379; 1998 U.S. LEXIS 4214; 66 U.S.L.W. 4538; 49 Fed. R. Evid. Serv. (Callaghan) 1; 40 Fed. R. Serv. 3d (Callaghan) 745; 159 A.L.R. Fed. 729; 98 Cal. Daily Op. Service 4932; 98 Daily Journal DAR 6932; 1998 Colo. J. C.A.R. 3175; 11 Fla. L. Weekly Fed. S 687

Case history
- Prior: In re: Sealed Case, 124 F.3d 230 (D.C. Cir. 1997); rehearing en banc denied, 129 F.3d 637 (D.C. Cir. 1997); cert. granted, 523 U.S. 1045 (1998).
- Subsequent: On remand, 172 F.3d 921 (D.C. Cir. 1998).

Holding
- Communications between a client and a lawyer are protected by attorney–client privilege even after the client's death.

Court membership
- Chief Justice William Rehnquist Associate Justices John P. Stevens · Sandra Day O'Connor; Antonin Scalia · Anthony Kennedy; David Souter · Clarence Thomas; Ruth Bader Ginsburg · Stephen Breyer

Case opinions
- Majority: Rehnquist, joined by Stevens, Kennedy, Souter, Ginsburg, Breyer
- Dissent: O'Connor, joined by Scalia, Thomas

Laws applied
- Attorney–client privilege

Swidler & Berlin v. United States, 524 U.S. 399 (1998), was a case in which the Supreme Court of the United States held that the death of an attorney's client does not terminate attorney–client privilege with respect to records of confidential communications between the attorney and the client.

The case concerned the efforts of Independent Counsel Kenneth Starr to gain access to notes taken by Deputy White House Counsel Vince Foster's attorney, James Hamilton, during a conversation with Foster regarding the White House travel office controversy shortly before Foster's suicide.

== Background ==
On July 11, 1993, Deputy White House Counsel Vince Foster visited James Hamilton at his home to discuss the possibility of retaining Hamilton as counsel to deal with a potential congressional probe regarding the White House travel office controversy. Hamilton later testified that Foster asked if what he told him would be confidential and Hamilton assured him that it would be. Foster died by suicide nine days later.

Starr subpoenaed the notes from this conversation in December 1995. Hamilton refused to turn them over, and a District Court judge, after reviewing the notes in camera, upheld his decision. A Federal Appeals Court then ruled 2-1 against Hamilton, saying that posthumous client-attorney privilege needed to be weighed against the importance of having information for a criminal investigation.

The Supreme Court agreed to hear the resulting appeal with unusual quickness.

== Before the Supreme Court ==
During oral argument, the United States as respondent was represented by Brett Kavanaugh. Hamilton argued pro se for the petitioners.

== The decision ==
Chief Justice Rehnquist wrote the majority opinion, noting the long tradition of attorney-client privilege and stating that, "The great body of this case law supports...the position that the privilege does survive in a case such as the present one." In response to Starr's argument that posthumous exceptions had been granted before, and that interest in whether a crime had been committed was sufficient reason to do so, the opinion noted that exceptions had been granted based on an implied waiver in order to fulfill the client’s testamentary intent (and necessarily implied the posthumous survival of attorney-client privilege), such as in estate disputes among heirs, and that there was no reason to suppose that "grand jury testimony about confidential communications furthers the client’s intent." Rehnquist wrote that attorney-client privilege cannot be reduced to the Fifth Amendment right against self-incrimination, but is broader, encompassing concerns about reputation and civil liability. Rehnquist noted the potential chilling effect on attorney-client communications if an additional exemption were granted, writing that "[u]ncertain privileges are disfavored."

== The dissent ==
Justice Sandra Day O'Connor wrote the dissent, agreeing with the Court of Appeals decision that posthumous exceptions to attorney–client privilege were permissible when there was a "compelling law enforcement need for information." O'Connor proposed a balancing test, which would weigh the client’s posthumous interest in confidentiality against a defendant’s right to exculpatory evidence and the needs of law enforcement.

== Subsequent developments ==
Starr's decision to subpoena the notes provoked spirited opposition from lawyer's groups and representatives of the terminally ill, who warned that people would be deterred from speaking candidly with their attorneys if their confidence could be breached after their death. American Bar Association president Jerome Shestack applauded the Supreme Court decision, saying: "I think it's good for clients. It's important for the legal profession; and I think it's good for the country that people will have confidence in that what they tell their attorney will remain in confidence."

== See also ==
- List of United States Supreme Court cases, volume 524
- List of United States Supreme Court cases
- Lists of United States Supreme Court cases by volume
- Attorney–client privilege
