= Donald Smaltz =

American lawyer

Don Smaltz

Personal details
- Born: 1936 or 1937 (age 88–89) Lebanon, Pennsylvania, U.S.
- Party: Republican
- Education: Pennsylvania State University (BA); Dickinson School of Law (JD)

Donald C. Smaltz (born 1936/1937) is an American lawyer who was appointed as Independent Counsel to investigate charges that United States Secretary of Agriculture Mike Espy had received improper gifts from companies with business before his department. Espy was acquitted, but the investigation ended in convictions of some associates and fines for the companies.

== Career ==
Smaltz was born in Lebanon, Pennsylvania, to a steelworker and an Italian immigrant mother. He attended Pennsylvania State University and Penn State Dickinson Law where he received his J.D. degree in 1961.

Smaltz served as a trial attorney for the Army's Judge Advocate General Corps. He then spent several years as Assistant United States Attorney in Los Angeles, where he specialized in white-collar crime.

In 1975, after moving into private practice, Smaltz grabbed headlines when he and another lawyer accused Watergate prosecutors of misconduct and persuaded a judge to dismiss two indictments against Richard Nixon's personal tax lawyer. Other high-profile clients have included the International Brotherhood of Teamsters and a bank with extensive ties to the late Philippines dictator Ferdinand Marcos and his wife, Imelda Marcos.

During the Bush Administration, Smaltz was asked by Judge George MacKinnon about leading an independent counsel probe into fraud and mismanagement at the United States Department of Housing and Urban Development and to join the Justice Department. Smaltz ultimately turned down the job.

=== Espy investigation ===
In 1994, Smaltz accepted an offer to serve as independent counsel in the Mike Espy case, a job he said he originally expected to last six months but ended up lasting four years. Espy was indicted and the case was brought to trial, but Espy was acquitted on all counts. Smaltz's investigation of Espy resulted in 14 indictments, including two convictions, three guilty pleas, four acquittals, and fines for three companies. The investigation cost $17 million.

== Personal life ==
In 1994, the same year Smaltz began the Espy investigation, he and his wife, Lois Smaltz, adopted two boys from an orphanage in Saint Petersburg, Russia. The Espy case lasted four years, most of which Smaltz spent away from his family, who remained in Rancho Palos Verdes, California. In 2007, Smaltz and his wife retired to Sequim, Washington.

== See also ==
- Bill Clinton
- Mike Espy
- Kenneth Starr
- Independent Counsel
- Lois Smaltz
