= Contempt: A Memoir of the Clinton Investigation =

2018 book by Ken Starr

- First edition
- Author: Ken Starr
- Publisher: Sentinel
- Publication date: September 11, 2018

Contempt: A Memoir of the Clinton Investigation is a memoir by Ken Starr about the impeachment of Bill Clinton, published in 2018.
