= David E. Garland =

- Born: September 24, 1947 (age 79); Crisfield, Maryland, U.S.
- Occupation: Former interim president of Baylor University
- Known for: Academic, university president

Academic background
- Education: University of Tübingen; Macquarie University; Southern Baptist Theological Seminary
- Thesis: The Intention of Matthew 23 (1976)

Academic work
- Discipline: Biblical studies
- Sub-discipline: New Testament studies
- Institutions: Baylor University

David E. Garland (born September 24, 1947) served as the interim president of Baylor University in Waco, Texas. His term began in June 2016 amid the Baylor sexual assault scandal and resignation of former president Ken Starr. Garland's term concluded on May 31, 2017.

== Career ==
Garland is a professor of Christian scriptures at Baylor's George W. Truett Theological Seminary, where he served as the seminary's fourth dean from June 2007 to June 2015. During this time, he was Baylor's interim president from August 2008 through May 2010 and interim provost from July 2014 to June 2015. He also served on the Southern Baptist Theological Seminary faculty for 21 years, was chairman of the biblical division from 1992 to 1997, and was the Ernest and Mildred Hogan Professor of New Testament Interpretation from 1993 to 1997. A magna cum laude graduate of Oklahoma Baptist University and a U.S. Navy veteran, he received his master of divinity and doctoral degrees from Southern Baptist Theological Seminary and also completed postgraduate work at Eberhardt-Karls Universitat in Tübingen, Germany and Macquarie University in Sydney, Australia.

In addition to his administrative duties, Garland is a New Testament scholar, having authored, coauthored and edited 24 books, including commentaries on the gospels of Matthew, Mark and Luke, Acts, 1 and 2 Corinthians, Colossians and Philemon. His publishers include Mercer University Press, Baker Books and Zondervan Publishing. He has also published more than 50 articles and contributed to the DVD series Deeper Connections, produced by Zondervan. His Mark: NIV Application Commentary received a Silver Medallion from the CBA in 1996. "The Gospel of Mark" in Zondervan Illustrated Bible Backgrounds Commentary received the Gold Medallion Award from the ECPA in 2003. 1 Corinthians (Baker exegetical commentary on the New Testament) received a Silver Medallion from the ECPA and an Award of Merit from Christianity Today in 2004. His book The Theology of Mark (2015) was nominated as a finalist in the Bible Reference category for the ECPA Christian Book Award. He is an elected member of Studiorum Novi Testamenti Societas.

Garland has preached in churches throughout the U.S., Australia and Africa and has served as interim pastor of 16 churches in Kentucky, Indiana and Texas.

Garland's late wife Dr. Diana S. Richmond Garland served as the founding dean of Baylor's School of Social Work, which was renamed in her honor. They coauthored several books including Flawed Families of the Bible: How God's Grace Works Through Imperfect Relationships (Brazos Press).

== Controversy ==
In 2017, the Houston Chronicle reported that a court filing revealed what Garland, as Baylor University interim president, stated in online communication with a school administrator. Garland cited an NPR show in which the author chronicled alcoholism in college, saying that the piece "added another perspective for me of what is going on in the heads of some women who may seem willingly to make themselves victims."

== Works ==
=== Books ===
- Garland, David E. (1979). The Intention of Matthew 23. Supplements to Novum Testamentum. Vol. 52. Leiden: Brill. ISBN 9789004059122. OCLC 5716409.
- ——— (1989). One hundred years of study on the Passion narratives. NABPR Bibliographic Series. Vol. 3. Macon, GA: Mercer University Press. ISBN 9780865543713. OCLC 20722613.
- ——— (1993). Reading Matthew: a literary and theological commentary on the first gospel. New York: Crossroad. ISBN 9780824512750. OCLC 26852818.
- ——— (1996). Mark : from biblical text-- to contemporary life. NIV Application Commentary. Grand Rapids, MI: Zondervan. ISBN 9780310493501. OCLC 34967176.
- ——— (1997). Colossians and Philemon: from biblical text-- to contemporary life. NIV Application Commentary. Grand Rapids, Mich: Zondervan. ISBN 9780310484806. OCLC 37606271.
- ——— (1999). 2 Corinthians. New American Commentary. Vol. 29. Nashville, TN: Broadman & Holman. ISBN 9780805401295. OCLC 42296165.
- ——— (2002). Mark. Zondervan illustrated Bible backgrounds commentary. Grand Rapids, Mich: Zondervan. ISBN 9780310278306. OCLC 212789146.
- ——— (2003). 1 Corinthians. Baker exegetical commentary on the New Testament. Grand Rapids, MI: Baker Academic. ISBN 9780801026300. OCLC 51726836.
- ———; Garland, Diana S Richmond (2007). Flawed families of the Bible: how God's grace works through imperfect relationships. Grand Rapids, MI: Brazos Press. ISBN 9781587431555. OCLC 71243858.
- ——— (2011). Luke. Zondervan Exegetical Commentary on the New Testament. Vol. 3. Grand Rapids, Mich: Zondervan. ISBN 9780310243595. OCLC 721085680.
- ——— (2015). A Theology of Mark's Gospel: good news about Jesus the Messiah, the Son of God. Biblical Theology of the New Testament. Grand Rapids, Mich: Zondervan. ISBN 9780310270881. OCLC 902985952.

=== As editor ===
- ———; Longman III, Tremper, eds. (2006–2012). The Expositor's Bible Commentary (13 volumes) (Revised ed.). Grand Rapids, Mich: Zondervan.

=== Articles and Chapters ===
- ——— (1979). "The Living Bible: The Unintended Abetting of Anti-Semitism". Review and Expositor. 76: 387–408. doi:10.1177/003463737907600309. S2CID 147369306.
- ——— (1979). "A Life Worthy of the Calling: Unity and Holiness; Ephesians 4:1–24". Review and Expositor. 76 (4): 517–527. doi:10.1177/003463737907600407. S2CID 147445956.
- ——— (1980). "Evangelism in the New Testament". Review and Expositor. 77 (4): 461–471. doi:10.1177/003463738007700402. S2CID 147104821.
- ——— (1989). "The Sufficiency of Paul, Minister of the New Covenant". Criswell Theological Review. 4: 21–3.
- ——— (1994). "Getting into the Boat: Matthew 14:22 – 33". In Gloer, W. Hulitt (ed.). Following Jesus: Sermons on Discipleship. Macon: Smyth & Helwys. pp. 51–57.
- ——— (2003). "The Dispute Over Food Sacrificed to Idols (1 Cor. 8:1 – 11:1)". Perspectives in Religious Studies. 30: 173–197.
- ——— (2005). "'Becoming All Things to All People': Mission in a Context of Idolatry: Accommodation or Fidelity?". Missionalia. 33: 287–302.
- ——— (2012). "Conforming to Christ's Spirit, Not to the Crowd: A Sermon on the Baptist Distinctive of Soul Competency". In Brewer, Brian (ed.). Distinctly Baptist: Proclaiming Identity in a New Generation. Valley Forge: Judson Press. pp. 32–41.

== Sources ==
- https://web.archive.org/web/20160618044528/http://www.baylor.edu/president/index.php?id=57010
- http://www.baylor.edu/alumni/magazine/1304/index.php?id=924922
- http://www.baylor.edu/truett/index.php?id=927919
- http://www.baylor.edu/social_work/index.php?id=926090
- http://www.baylor.edu/mediacommunications/news.php?action=story&story=181484
