= Joseph S. Ammerman =

American politician (1924–1993)

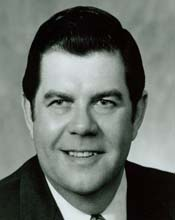

Member of the U.S. House of Representatives from Pennsylvania's 23rd district
- In office January 3, 1977 – January 3, 1979
- Preceded by: Albert Johnson
- Succeeded by: Bill Clinger

Member of the Pennsylvania Senate from the 34th district
- In office January 5, 1971 – January 4, 1977
- Preceded by: Daniel Bailey
- Succeeded by: Doyle Corman

United States Attorney for the Western District of Pennsylvania
- In office 1961–1963
- Appointed by: John F. Kennedy
- Preceded by: Hubert Irving Teitelbaum
- Succeeded by: Gustave Diamond

Personal details
- Born: Joseph Scofield Ammerman; July 14, 1924 Curwensville, Pennsylvania, U.S.
- Died: October 14, 1993 (aged 69) Curwensville, Pennsylvania, U.S.
- Party: Democratic
- Education: Dickinson College; Penn State Dickinson Law (JD)

Joseph Scofield Ammerman (July 14, 1924 – October 14, 1993) was an American lawyer and politician who served as a Democratic member of the U.S. House of Representatives from Pennsylvania for one term from 1977 to 1979.

== Early life ==
Joseph Ammerman was born in Curwensville, Pennsylvania. He served in the United States Army from 1943 to 1946. He graduated from Dickinson College in Carlisle, Pennsylvania in 1948 and received his J.D. from the Dickinson School of Law in 1950.

== Career ==
He was a delegate to Democratic National Convention in 1952. In 1953, he was elected to the position of district attorney of Clearfield County. He was the United States attorney for the Western District of Pennsylvania from 1961 to 1963, and a member of the Pennsylvania State Senate from 1970 to 1977.

In 1976, he was elected as a Democrat to the 95th Congress, but was an unsuccessful candidate for reelection in 1978.

After his term in the House, he served as judge, court of common pleas in Clearfield County, Pennsylvania from 1986 to 1993.

== Death and legacy ==
Ammerman died on October 14, 1993. In 2009, a portrait of Ammerman was hung in the portrait gallery of the Clearfield County Courthouse.

Pennsylvania State Senate
Preceded by Daniel A. Bailey	Member of the Pennsylvania Senate for the 34th district 1971–1977	Succeeded by Doyle Corman
U.S. House of Representatives
Preceded by Albert Johnson	Member of the U.S. House of Representatives from Pennsylvania's 23rd congressional district January 3, 1977 – January 3, 1979	Succeeded by Bill Clinger
