= James C. McKay =

American lawyer

Jim McKay
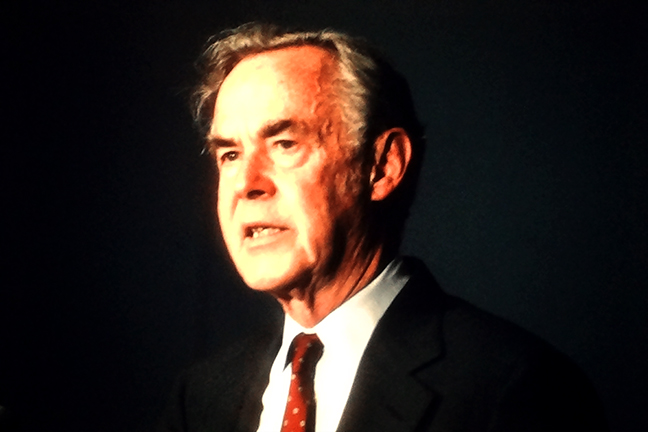

Personal details
- Born: February 24, 1917; South Pasadena, California, U.S.
- Died: November 23, 2015 (aged 98); Chevy Chase, Maryland, U.S.
- Education: Cornell University (BA); Georgetown University (LLB)

James C. "Jim" McKay (February 24, 1917 – November 23, 2015) was an American trial lawyer. As Independent Counsel from 1987 to 1990, he investigated allegations of illicit lobbying and conflicts of interest during the administration of Ronald Reagan, including investigation of then-sitting U.S. Attorney Edwin Meese.

== Early life ==
McKay was born in South Pasadena, California, and grew up in Washington, D.C. He received a bachelor's degree from the Cornell University Agricultural College in 1938. He served in the U.S. Navy during World War II, rising to the rank of Lieutenant Commander and commanding patrol craft in the Mediterranean Sea. After the war, he received a law degree from Georgetown University in 1947.

== Early legal career ==
After serving for one year as an assistant U.S. attorney in Washington, McKay began practicing law at Covington & Burling in Washington, D.C., where he became a partner in 1957. As a specialist in antitrust law, McKay represented clients such as the National Football League and Continental Baking.

== Independent Counsel for the Wedtech Investigation ==
In 1987, the U.S. Court of Appeals for the D.C. Circuit appointed McKay as Independent Counsel to investigate the so-called Wedtech scandal. The appointment began after the Justice Department requested a special prosecutor to investigate allegations that Lyn Nofziger had violated a prohibition on lobbying for clients such as Wedtech shortly after Nofziger's service on the White House staff of president Ronald Reagan. Under McKay's leadership, the investigation expanded to assess evidence that Edwin Meese—by then the sitting U.S. Attorney General—had intervened on behalf of Wedtech and otherwise violated conflicts of interest standards during Meese's service as White House Counsel to President Reagan. In an 814-page report issued in 1988, McKay concluded that Meese had fallen short of ethical standards and likely violated federal conflict-of-interest and tax laws, but McKay declined to request a criminal indictment of Meese because there was no evidence that Meese had acted "for personal gain." The independent counsel prosecuted Nofziger for illegal lobbying; the jury convicted Nofziger but the conviction was overturned on appeal.

== Later years ==
McKay served briefly at the age of 83 in the Professional Responsibility Advisory Office of the U.S. Department of Justice. The Washington Post reported that McKay was "one of the oldest Justice Department lawyers ever hired."

As a senior counsel associated with Covington & Burling, McKay continued to represent clients on a pro bono basis well beyond his 90th birthday. In his later years, McKay focused particularly on representing veterans seeking benefits. In 2008, the United States Court of Appeals for Veterans Claims presented McKay with the Hart T. Mankin Distinguished Service Award. In 2011, the National Veterans Legal Services Program awarded McKay its Senator Daniel Inouye Award for his "unyielding support for veterans, service members and military families."

In 2013, Eio Books published a novel by McKay based on his World War II experience, entitled Billy's War. McKay died at his home in Chevy Chase, Maryland, in 2015, at the age of 98. His survivors included his wife of 72 years, the former Mary Anne Hunter.
