= White House FBI files controversy =

Political scandal of the Clinton administration

- Date: Originating events 1993–1994; investigations 1996–2000
- Location: Washington, D.C., United States
- Also known as: Filegate
- Outcome: Clinton, Nussbaum, and other White House officials exonerated by Independent Counsel; Head of White House Office of Personnel Security resigned
- Accused: First Lady Hillary Rodham Clinton; White House counsel Bernard Nussbaum several other White House officials
- Charges: Improper use of confidential information; Testifying falsely about White House hiring

The White House FBI files controversy of the Clinton Administration, often referred to as Filegate, arose in June 1996 around improper access in 1993 and 1994 to FBI security-clearance documents. Craig Livingstone, director of the White House's Office of Personnel Security, improperly requested, and received from the FBI, background reports concerning several hundred individuals without asking permission. The revelations provoked a strong political and press reaction because many of the files covered White House employees from previous Republican administrations, including top presidential advisors. Under criticism, Livingstone resigned from his position. Allegations were made that senior White House figures, including First Lady Hillary Rodham Clinton, may have requested and read the files for political purposes, and that the First Lady had authorized the hiring of the underqualified Livingstone.

The matter was investigated by the House Government Reform and Oversight Committee, the Senate Judiciary Committee, and the Whitewater Independent Counsel. In 1998, Independent Counsel Kenneth Starr exonerated President Bill Clinton as well as the First Lady of any involvement in the matter. In 2000, Independent Counsel Robert Ray issued his final report on Filegate, stating that there was no credible evidence of any criminal activity by any individual in the matter and no credible evidence that senior White House figures or the First Lady had requested the files or had acted improperly or testified improperly regarding Livingstone's hiring. A separate lawsuit on the matter brought by Judicial Watch, a conservative watchdog group, lingered on for years and was dismissed by a federal judge in 2010.

== Improper use of files issue ==
Improper use of Federal Bureau of Investigation background reports was at the heart of the "Filegate" affair.

"Filegate" began on June 5, 1996, when Republican Pennsylvania Congressman William F. Clinger, Jr., chair of the House Committee on Government Reform and Oversight, announced that the committee had found, during their ongoing "Travelgate" investigations, that FBI background reports on Travelgate figure Billy Dale had been delivered to the White House. The following day, the White House delivered to the committee hundreds of other such files related to White House employees of the Reagan Administration and George H. W. Bush Administration, for which Craig Livingstone, director of the White House's Office of Personnel Security, had improperly requested and received background reports from the FBI in 1993 and 1994, without asking permission of the subject individuals. Estimates ranged from 400 to 700 to 900 unauthorized file disclosures. The incident caused an intense burst of criticism because many of the files covered White House employees from previous Republican administrations, including top figures such as James Baker, Brent Scowcroft, and Marlin Fitzwater.

Initial White House explanations for what had happened varied, but generally characterized it as a series of mistakes made without bad intent and offered apologies to those affected. President Clinton said that, "It appears to have been a completely honest bureaucratic snafu." However, his Republican opponent in the ongoing 1996 presidential election, Senator Bob Dole, compared it to the enemies list kept by the Nixon administration. Republicans made other charges, including that the White House was trying to dig up damaging information about Republicans in general and that the file transfer was motivated by a desire to slander Dale and other White House Travel Office officials in order to justify their dismissal.

On June 18, 1996, Attorney General Janet Reno asked the FBI to look into it; FBI Director Louis Freeh acknowledged that both the FBI and especially the White House had committed "egregious violations of privacy" (in some cases the background reports contained information about extramarital affairs, transgressions with the law, and medical issues). On June 21 Reno decided it was a conflict of interest for the U.S. Department of Justice to further investigate the matter, and thus recommended that it be folded into the overall umbrella of the Whitewater investigations, under charge of Independent Counsel Kenneth Starr. In any case, Starr had already begun looking into it.

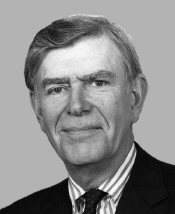
Republican Congressman Bill Clinger's House Government Reform and Oversight Committee discovered Filegate in 1996 and held hearings on it.

On June 26, 1996, Clinger's Government Reform and Oversight Committee held hearings on the matter. Livingstone, who announced his resignation at the start of his testimony that day, and his assistant, Anthony Marceca, insisted during the committee's hearings that the mishandled files were a result of a bureaucratic mixup and that no improper motivations were behind it. They said that when the George H. W. Bush administrative staff left the White House in January 1993, they had taken all the files of the Office of Personnel Security with them for use in the Bush Library, as they were permitted to do under law. The OPS staff were trying to rebuild these records to include those of permanent White House employees who remained to work in the Clinton administration; Marceca, a civilian investigator for the Army, had been hired for this task. In doing so, they received an outdated list from the Secret Service of White House employees, which included many names who were no longer employees. This list was then given to the FBI and the personnel background files returned as a result. Lisa Wetzl, another assistant, testified that she discovered the mistake in mid-1994 and destroyed the request list.

Also called to testify were former White House counsel Bernard Nussbaum and former associate counsel William H. Kennedy III. Livingstone, Nussbaum, and Kennedy all offered apologies to those whose files had been obtained. On September 24, 1996, the Government Reform and Oversight Committee approved, on party lines, an interim report on the affair, blasting the Clinton Administration for a "cavalier approach" towards sensitive security procedures and saying that further investigation was necessary to determine if the events surrounding the files handling were "a blunder, the result of colossal incompetence, or whether they are established to be more serious or even criminal." The Committee does not seem to have ever issued a final report.

The Senate Judiciary Committee was also involved in investigating the matter, holding hearings beginning June 29, 1996, and focusing on allegations that White House was engaged in a "dirty tricks" operation reminiscent of the Nixon administration. Looking into accusations that senior White House officials or the First Lady may have inappropriately perused the files, in October 1996, Republican committee chair Orrin Hatch requested that the FBI do a fingerprint analysis of them. On November 3, 1996, the FBI informed the committee that no fingerprints of either the First Lady or any other named senior official were on the files.

== Who hired Livingstone issue ==
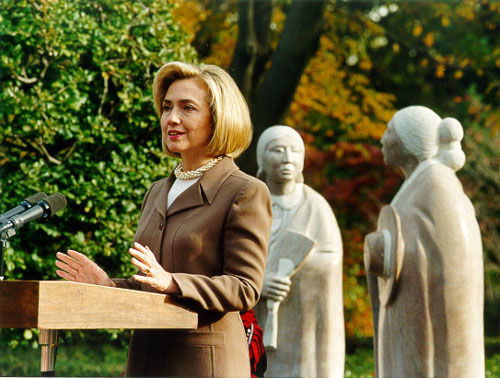
First Lady Hillary Rodham Clinton came under examination regarding whether she had had any role in hiring for the White House's Office of Personnel Security (photo taken at the Jacqueline Kennedy Garden).

A secondary question of the Filegate controversy revolved around what the Office of Personnel Security was, who had authorized the hiring of Livingstone, and whether he was qualified for the job. The Office was not responsible for actual White House security, as that was the charge of the United States Secret Service, nor did it perform background checks on potential White House employees, a task done by the FBI, nor did it keep the regular personnel files of employees, which were held in a different office within the White House. Rather, its role was to keep track of who was employed by the White House, make sure their security clearances were up to date, and give security briefings to new hires.

Nevertheless, Livingstone seemed to lack qualifications for even this position; he had worked on a number of Democratic Party campaigns and transitions, including being an advance man for the Clinton-Gore 1992 campaign, and his only prior job in the "security" field was that of a local bar bouncer at a Washington, D.C., night club. (At the congressional hearings, Livingstone objected to "false and unfair caricatures of who I am. [...] I have worked hard for little or no pay in political campaigns for candidates who I felt would make this country a better place to live.") Initially, White House officials could not explain why Livingstone was hired, nor who had hired him. After a week of uncertainty, Clinton aide George Stephanopoulos told ABC News that White House deputy counsel Vince Foster had initially hired Livingstone on a temporary basis, and that after Foster's death, associate counsel Kennedy had taken Livingstone on.

An FBI document suggested that Livingstone had been given his position because First Lady Hillary Clinton was a friend of Livingstone's mother and had recommended him. Hillary Clinton stated that while she was once photographed with the mother in a large group, she did not know her. Hillary Clinton was briefly deposed at the White House by the Independent Counsel regarding this matter on January 14, 1998. (That same day, the same Office of the Independent Counsel staff were listening to taped conversations of Linda Tripp and Monica Lewinsky; the Lewinsky scandal was soon to break.) In 1999, Clinton gave a sworn statement that she had nothing to do with Livingstone's hiring. Livingstone also stated under oath there was no truth to the supposed hiring relationship. Hillary Clinton would later refer to the whole files matter as a "pseudo-scandal".

== Official findings ==
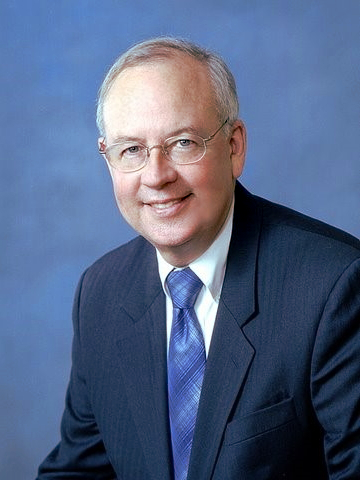
Independent Counsel Kenneth Starr exonerated both the President and the First Lady with respect to the FBI files matter in 1998.

On November 19, 1998, Independent Counsel Starr testified before the House Judiciary Committee in connection with the Impeachment of Bill Clinton over charges related to the Lewinsky scandal. Here, for the first time, Starr exonerated both President Clinton and the First Lady of complicity in the FBI files matter, saying "while there are outstanding issues that we are attempting to resolve with respect to one individual [we] found no evidence that anyone higher [than Livingstone or Marceca] was in any way involved in ordering the files from the FBI. Second, we have found no evidence that information contained in the files of former officials was used for an improper purpose." (Starr also chose this occasion to clear President Clinton in the Travelgate matter, and to say that he had not committed impeachable wrongdoing in the Whitewater matter; Democrats on the committee immediately criticized Starr for withholding all these findings until after the 1998 Congressional elections.)

In March 2000, Independent Counsel Robert Ray, Starr's successor, issued the office's final report on the matter, as part of a concerted effort to wrap up all Whitewater-related cases before the end of Bill Clinton's term. Ray determined that there was no credible evidence of any criminal activity by any individual in the matter. It attributed the improper collection of the files by Marceca due to his having an outdated Secret Service list of White House passes, as Marceca had originally claimed. It stated that even though Marceca's statements were sometimes "contradictory and misleading", they were "sufficiently transparent" and there was insufficient evidence to prove that Anthony Marceca had made false statements to Congress during his testimony. The report ascribed the FBI files matter to "a failure of process at many levels," saying that the Secret Service had provided critically erroneous data, and that this was compounded by the White House's informal process of requesting sensitive information by "inexperienced, untrained, and unsupervised personnel with backgrounds as political operatives."

Based on an investigation that included the prior fingerprint analysis, the report further stated that:

there was no substantial and credible evidence that any senior White House official, or First Lady Hillary Rodham Clinton, was involved in seeking confidential Federal Bureau of Investigation background reports of former White House staff from prior administrations of President Bush and President Reagan.

— Independent Counsel Robert Ray,

Ray's report also concluded that there was no credible evidence that Bernard Nussbaum testified falsely about not having discussed Livingstone's hiring with the First Lady, and found as well that there was no personal relationship between the First Lady and Livingstone that had formed the basis for his hiring.

== Judicial Watch lawsuit ==
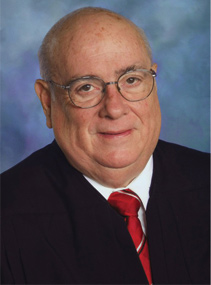
For over a decade, Federal Judge Royce C. Lamberth presided over a civil lawsuit emanating from the Filegate matter.

Separately from the Independent Counsel investigation, Judicial Watch, a conservative watchdog group, engaged in long-running litigation over the White House personnel file controversy. It was initially filed in September 1996 and sought $90 million in damages. Judicial Watch's Cara Leslie Alexander et al. vs. Federal Bureau of Investigation et al. class action lawsuit, filed on behalf of five low-level former members of the Reagan and George H. W. Bush Administrations, alleged that Livingstone, along with Anthony Marceca and William Kennedy, obtained the files and then rifled through them. Judicial Watch in particular alleged that Kennedy had abused the FBI background report process. Judicial Watch founder and Clintons antagonist suprême Larry Klayman attracted enough attention with the case to have the recurring Larry Claypool character modeled after him on the television series The West Wing. As late as January 2000, Judicial Watch was filing affidavits in the United States District Court for the District of Columbia under Judge Royce C. Lamberth related to the case. In December 2002 Judicial Watch obtained a ruling from Judge Lamberth that recently uncovered White House e-mails be searched for possible evidence in the lawsuit. Klayman said, "Hillary Clinton was the mastermind of Filegate. She will not escape justice." Klayman and Judicial Watch had a severe falling out in 2003, however, and several years went by with little or nothing happening in the lawsuit.

On March 9, 2010, Judge Lamberth dismissed the case. The judge asserted that the plaintiffs, despite years of opportunity, had failed to provide any evidence that the affair was a grand conspiracy rather than a bureaucratic mistake, and said that "this court is left to conclude that with the lawsuit, to quote Gertrude Stein, 'there's no there there.'" Nussbaum, one of the defendants, derisively said "No kidding" when informed of the dismissal. Media reports concluded that, fourteen years after the initial events were set in motion, Filegate was finally over. In May 2010, Judicial Watch filed an appeal of the dismissal with the United States Court of Appeals for the District of Columbia Circuit, but the Court of Appeals affirmed the dismissal on November 14, 2011, thereby bringing the case to an end.
