= White House travel office controversy =

Ethics controversy of the Clinton administration

- Date: Originating events 1993; investigations 1993–2000
- Location: Washington, D.C., United States
- Also known as: Travelgate
- Outcome: Fired White House travel office director acquitted at trial; President Clinton exonerated by Independent Counsel; First Lady Clinton and Watkins not indicted
- Accused: President Bill Clinton; First Lady Hillary Rodham Clinton; White House director of administration David Watkins
- Charges: Improper direction of government business; Testifying falsely about White House firings

The White House travel office controversy, sometimes referred to as Travelgate, was the first major ethics controversy of the Clinton administration. It began in May 1993, when seven employees of the White House Travel Office were fired. This action was unusual because executive-branch employees typically remain in their posts for many years (even though they can be terminated by, and serve at the pleasure of, the President).

The White House stated the firings were done because financial improprieties in the Travel Office operation during previous administrations had been revealed by an FBI investigation. Critics contended the firings were done to allow friends and campaign donors of President Bill Clinton and First Lady Hillary Rodham Clinton to take over the travel business and that the involvement of the FBI was unwarranted. Heavy media attention forced the White House to reinstate most of the employees in other jobs and remove the Clinton associates from the travel role.

Further investigations by the FBI and the Department of Justice, the White House itself, the General Accounting Office, the House Government Reform and Oversight Committee, and the Whitewater Independent Counsel all took place over the subsequent years. Travel Office Director Billy Dale was charged with embezzlement but found not guilty in 1995. In 1998, Independent Counsel Kenneth Starr exonerated Bill Clinton of any involvement in the matter.

Hillary Clinton gradually came under scrutiny for allegedly having played a central role in the firings and making false statements about her involvement therein. In 2000, Independent Counsel Robert Ray issued his final report on Travelgate. He sought no charges against her, saying that while some of Clinton's statements were factually false, there was insufficient evidence that these statements were either knowingly false or that she understood that her statements led to the firings.

== The White House Travel Office ==
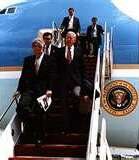
The White House Travel Office was responsible for getting the White House press corps into place, including landing before Air Force One in order to get photo opportunities such as this one.

The White House Travel Office, known officially as either the White House Travel and Telegraph Office or the White House Telegraph and Travel Office, dates back to the Andrew Jackson administration and serves to handle travel arrangements for the White House press corps, with costs billed to the participating news organizations. By the time of the start of the Clinton administration, it was quartered in the Old Executive Office Building, and had seven employees with a yearly budget of $7 million. Staffers serve at the pleasure of the president; however, in practice, the staffers were career employees who in some cases had worked in the Travel Office since the 1960s and 1970s, through both Democratic and Republican administrations.

Travel Office Director Billy Ray Dale had held that position since 1982, serving through most of the Reagan and George H. W. Bush administrations, and had started in the Travel Office in 1961. To handle the frequent last-minute arrangements of presidential travel and the specialized requirements of the press, Dale did not conduct competitive bidding for travel services, but relied upon a charter company called Airline of the Americas.

== Initial White House actions ==
According to the White House, the incoming Clinton administration had heard rumors of irregularities in the Travel Office and possible kickbacks to an office employee from a charter air company. They looked at a review by KPMG Peat Marwick which discovered that Dale kept an off-book ledger, had $18,000 of unaccounted-for checks, and kept chaotic office records. White House Chief of Staff Mack McLarty and the White House counsels thus decided to fire the Travel Office staff and reorganize it. The actual terminations were done on May 19, 1993, by White House director of administration David Watkins. There was also a feeling among the White House and its supporters that the Travel Office had never been investigated by the media due to its close relationship with press corps members and the plush accommodations it afforded them and favors it did for them. (Congress would later discover that in October 1988, a whistleblower within the Travel Office had alleged financial improprieties; the Reagan White House counsel looked into the claim but took no action.)

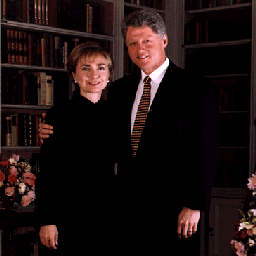
Starting in May 1993, Travelgate was the first major ethics controversy of the Clinton administration, with First Lady Hillary Rodham Clinton's actions coming under increasing scrutiny.

Republicans and other critics saw the events differently. They alleged that friends of President Bill Clinton, including his third cousin Catherine Cornelius, had sought the firings in order to get the business for themselves. Dale and his staff had been replaced with Little Rock, Arkansas-based World Wide Travel, a company with a substantial reputation in the industry but with several ties to the Clintons. In addition, Hollywood producer and Inauguration chairman Harry Thomason, a friend of both Clintons, and his business partner, Darnell Martens, were looking to get their air charter company, TRM, the White House business in place of Airline of the Americas. The Clinton campaign had been TRM's sole client during 1992, collecting commissions from booking charter flights for the campaign. Martens wanted the White House to award TRM a $500,000 contract for an aircraft audit, while also seeking Travel Office charter business as an intermediary which did not own any planes.

Attention initially focused on the role of the Federal Bureau of Investigation (FBI), since on May 12, 1993, a week before the firings, associate White House counsel William Kennedy had requested that the FBI look into possible improprieties in the Travel Office operation. FBI agents went there and, although initially reluctant, authorized a preliminary investigation. Deputy White House Counsel Vince Foster became worried about the firings about to take place and ordered the KPMG Peat Marwick review, asking the FBI to hold off in the meantime. The accounting review started on May 14 and the report was given to the White House on May 17. KPMG was unable to do an actual audit, because there were so few records in the Travel Office that could be audited and because the office did not use the double-entry bookkeeping system that audits are based upon. One KPMG representative later described the office as "an ungodly mess in terms of records" with ten years of material piled up in a closet. When the review came back with its reports of irregularities, Watkins went ahead with the terminations on May 19.

== Investigations ==
The travel office affair quickly became the first major ethics controversy of the Clinton presidency and an embarrassment for the new administration. Criticism from political opponents and especially the news media became intense; the White House was later described as having been "paralyzed for a week". The effect was intensified by cable television news and the advent of the 24-hour news cycle. Within three days of the firings, World Wide Travel voluntarily withdrew from the White House travel operation and were replaced on a temporary basis by American Express Travel Services. (Later, after a competitive bid, American Express received the permanent role to book press charters.)

Various investigations took place.

=== FBI ===
On May 28, 1993, the FBI issued a report saying it had done nothing wrong in its contacts with the White House. (This conclusion was reiterated by a March 1994 report by the Justice Department's Office of Professional Responsibility.)

Meanwhile, the FBI investigation of the Travel Office practices themselves continued, soon focusing on Travel Office Director Billy Dale. who was charged with embezzlement but found not guilty in 1995. During the summer of 1993, the other staffers of the office were informed that they were no longer a target of the investigation.

=== Clinton White House report ===
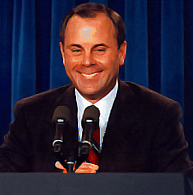
White House Chief of Staff Mack McLarty took some of the early heat for Travelgate in 1993.

On July 2, 1993, the White House issued its own 80-page report on the firings, one that the New York Times termed "strikingly self-critical". Co-written by Chief of Staff McLarty, it criticized five White House officials, included McLarty himself, Watkins, Kennedy, Cornelius, and another, for dismissing the Travel Office members improperly, for appearing to pressure the FBI into its involvement, and for allowing friends of the Clintons to become involved in a matter with which they had a financial stake. It said that the employees should instead have been placed on administrative leave. However, the White House said no illegal actions had occurred, and no officials would be terminated; this did not satisfy Senate Minority Leader Bob Dole, who called for an independent investigation. As Chief of Staff McLarty personally apologized to the fired Travel Office employees—some of whom had all their personal documents and travel photographs related to years of service thrown out during the firing process—and said they would be given other jobs (which five of them were; Dale and his assistant director retired.) The White House report also contained the initial indications of the First Lady's involvement in the firings, saying that she had taken an interest in the Travel Office's alleged mismanagement and had been informed two days in advance that the firings would take place. There was no indication of involvement from President Clinton himself, although he had earlier taken broad public responsibility for what had happened.

The travel office controversy was subsequently judged to have been a factor in Vince Foster's depression and July 20, 1993, suicide. In his torn-up resignation note from a few days before, he wrote "No one in The White House, to my knowledge, violated any law or standard of conduct, including any action in the Travel Office. There was no intent to benefit any individual or specific group. [...] The press is covering up the illegal benefits they received from the travel staff". (In the last part, Foster may have been referring to lax customs treatment by the Travel Office of goods brought back from foreign trips by reporters.)

=== GAO report ===
In July 1993, Congress requested the non-partisan General Accounting Office investigate the firings; on May 2, 1994, the GAO concluded that the White House did have legal authority to terminate the Travel Office employees without cause, because they served at the pleasure of the president. However, it also concluded that Cornelius, Thomason, and Martens, who all had potential business interests involved, had possibly influenced the decision. Moreover, the GAO report indicated that the First Lady played a larger role than previously thought before the firings, with Watkins saying she had urged "that action be taken to get 'our people' into the travel office." The First Lady, who had given a written statement to the inquiry, said she did "not recall this conversation with the same level of detail as Mr. Watkins."

=== Independent Counsel investigation begins ===
Special prosecutor Robert B. Fiske tangentially investigated travel office events during the first half of 1994, as part of investigating the circumstances surrounding Foster's death.

In August 1994, Independent Counsel Kenneth Starr took over from Fiske in investigating Whitewater, Foster, and indirectly the travel office matter. On July 22, 1995, Hillary Clinton gave a deposition under oath to the Independent Counsel that touched on travel office questions; she denied having had a role in the firings, but was unable to recall many specifics of conversations with Foster and Watkins.

=== Oversight Committee investigation begins ===
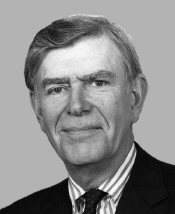
Republican Congressman Bill Clinger's House Government Reform and Oversight Committee investigated Travelgate during 1994 and 1995.

In late 1994, following the 1994 Congressional elections which switched Congress from Democratic to Republican control, the House Government Reform and Oversight Committee, chaired by Pennsylvania Republican William Clinger, launched an investigation into the White House Travel Office firings. In October 1995, the committee began hearings on the matter; Clinger soon accused the White House of withholding pertinent documents and sought subpoenas to compel witnesses to appear.

=== Private investigations ===
Not all investigations were by governmental bodies. The magazine The American Spectator, which had a well-established animus towards the First Couple, focused on the Travelgate story as one of many Clinton-related matters it thought scandalous, describing it as "a story about influence-peddling and sleazy deal-making... in the Clinton White House". Spectator publisher R. Emmett Tyrrell, Jr. would claim that the magazine's early Travelgate stories provided useful material to the congressional investigations. In general, Clinton administration controversies such as Travelgate allowed opinion magazines and political debate television shows to attract subscribers and viewers.

== Prosecution and acquittal of Billy Dale ==
Meanwhile, as a consequence of the FBI investigation, former Travel Office Director Billy Dale was indicted by a federal grand jury on December 7, 1994, on two counts of embezzlement and criminal conversion, charged with wrongfully depositing into his own bank account $68,000 in checks from media organizations traveling with the president during the period between 1988 and 1991. He faced up to 20 years in prison if convicted. Dale's attorneys conceded that funds had been co-mingled, but stated that Dale had not stolen anything but rather used the monies for the substantial tips and off-the-book payments that the job required, especially in foreign countries, and that anything left over was used as a discount against future trips.

At the 13-day trial in October and November 1995, prominent journalists such as ABC News' Sam Donaldson and The Los Angeles Times' Jack Nelson testified as character witnesses on Dale's behalf. Much of the trial focused on the details of the movement of Travel Office funds into Dale's personal account, and not on the political overtones of the case. The jury acquitted Dale of both charges on November 16, 1995, following less than two hours of deliberations.

== A memo surfaces regarding the First Lady ==
On January 5, 1996, a new development thrust the travel office matter again to the forefront. A two-year-old memo from White House director of administration David Watkins surfaced that identified First Lady Hillary Rodham Clinton as the motivating force behind the firings, with the additional involvement of Vince Foster and Harry Thomason. "Foster regularly informed me that the First Lady was concerned and desired action. The action desired was the firing of the Travel Office staff." Written in fall 1993, apparently intended for McLarty, the Watkins memo also said "we both know that there would be hell to pay" if "we failed to take swift and decisive action in conformity with the First Lady's wishes." This memo contradicted the First Lady's previous statements in the GAO investigation, that she had played no role in the firings and had not consulted with Thomason beforehand. The White House also found it difficult to explain why the memo was so late in surfacing when all the previous investigations had requested all relevant materials. House committee chair Clinger charged a cover-up was taking place and vowed to pursue new material.

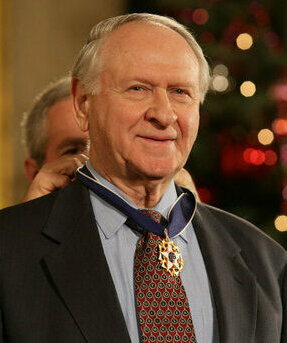
New York Times columnist William Safire had endorsed Bill Clinton in 1992, but by 1996 he was the First Lady's most infamous critic and his nose a metaphorical target for the President's ire.

These developments, following Hillary Clinton's prior disputed statements about her cattle futures dealings and Whitewater, led to a famous exchange in which high-profile New York Times columnist William Safire, who had endorsed Bill Clinton in the previous election, wrote that many Americans were coming to the "sad realization that our First Lady—a woman of undoubted talents who was a role model for many in her generation—is a congenital liar" who "has never been called to account for lying herself or in suborning lying in her aides and friends," followed by White House Press Secretary Mike McCurry saying that "the President, if he were not the President, would have delivered a more forceful response to that—on the bridge of Mr. Safire's nose."

As a result of the discovery of the Watkins memo, and based upon a suggestion from the Office of Independent Counsel, on March 20, 1996, Attorney General Janet Reno requested that Whitewater Independent Counsel Kenneth Starr expand his inquiry to specifically include the travel office affair, in particular allegations that White House employees had lied about Hillary Clinton's role in the firings, and that David Watkins or Hillary Clinton had made false statements in previous testimony to the GAO, Congress, or the Independent Counsel.

The Congressional investigation continued; on March 21, 1996, Hillary Clinton submitted a deposition under oath to the House Government Reform and Oversight Committee, again acknowledging concern about irregularities in the Travel Office but denying a direct role in the firings and expressing a lack of recollection to a number of questions. A battle of wills took place between the legislative and executive branches. On May 9, 1996, President Clinton refused to turn over additional documents related to the matter, claiming executive privilege. House committee chair Clinger threatened a contempt of Congress resolution against the president, and the White House partially backed down on May 30, surrendering 1,000 of the 3,000 documents the committee asked for.

Meanwhile, the seven dismissed employees were back in the picture. In March 1996 the House voted 350–43 to reimburse them for all of their legal expenses; in September 1996, Democratic Senator Harry Reid led an unsuccessful attempt to block this measure. In May 1996, the seven filed a $35 million lawsuit against Harry Thomason and Darnell Martens, alleging unlawful interference with their employment and emotional distress.

On June 5, 1996, Clinger announced that the committee's investigations had discovered that the White House had requested access to Billy Dale's FBI background check report seven months after the terminations, in what Clinger said was an improper effort to justify the firings. It was rapidly discovered that the White House had additionally gotten improper access to hundreds of other FBI background reports, many on former White House employees in Republican administrations; thus was born the Filegate controversy.

The Senator Al D'Amato-chaired Senate Special Whitewater Committee, which had begun the previous year, issued its findings in a majority report on June 18, 1996; it did not investigate Travelgate directly, but did say that "[Hillary] Clinton, upon learning of [Vince] Foster's death, at least realized its connection to [the] Travelgate scandal, and perhaps to the Whitewater matter, and dispatched her trusted lieutenants to contain any potential embarrassment or political damage." Minority Democratic members of the Committee derided these findings as "a legislative travesty," "a witch hunt," and "a political game."

The House Government Reform and Oversight Committee issued its majority report on September 18, 1996, in which it accused the Clinton administration of having obstructed the committee's efforts to investigate the Travelgate scandal. It portrayed Bill Clinton as being heavily involved in the travel office affair, more than any other investigation. The report's chapter titles were lurid: "The White House Stonewalled All Investigations into the White House Travel Office Firings and Related Matters", "The White House Initiated a Full-Scale Campaign of Misinformation in the Aftermath of the Travel Office Firings and President Clinton Led the Misinformation Campaign from the First Days of the Travelgate Debacle", "Foster's Death Shattered a White House Just Recovering from an Abysmal First 6 Months of Administration", and so forth. Democratic members of the Committee walked out in protest over the report, with ranking member Henry Waxman calling it "an embarrassment to you [Chairman Clinger], this committee and this Congress" and "a crassly partisan smear campaign against President Clinton, Mrs. Clinton and this administration." The following month Clinger forwarded the report, along with one on Filegate, to the Independent Counsel, suggesting that the testimony of several witnesses be looked at for possible perjury or obstruction of justice. Democrats said this was politically motivated in an attempt to influence the 1996 presidential election.

== Independent Counsel findings ==
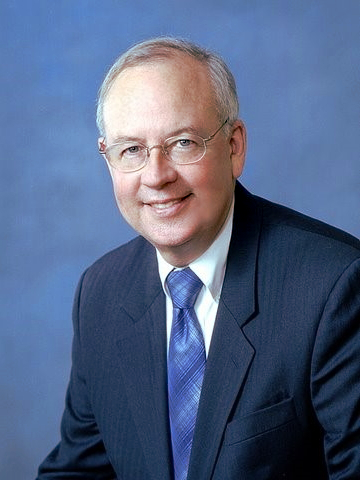
Independent Counsel Kenneth Starr exonerated President Clinton with respect to Travelgate, but not the First Lady, in late 1998.

Almost two years passed. Independent Counsel Starr continued his investigation. Starr wanted access to notes that Vince Foster's attorney took in a conversation with Foster about the travel office affair shortly before Foster's suicide, but on June 25, 1998, the U.S. Supreme Court ruled 6–3 against Starr in Swidler & Berlin v. United States, stating that attorney–client privilege extends beyond the grave. In September 1998 Independent Counsel Starr released the famous Starr Report, concerning offenses that may have been committed by President Clinton as part of the Lewinsky scandal. It did not mention the travel office matter.

On November 19, 1998, Starr testified before the House Judiciary Committee in connection with the impeachment of Bill Clinton over charges related to the Lewinsky scandal. Here, for the first time, Starr exonerated President Clinton of complicity in the travel office affair, saying that while investigations were not complete, "the president was not involved in our... investigation." (Starr also chose this occasion to clear President Clinton in the Filegate matter, and to say he had not committed impeachable wrongdoing in the Whitewater matter; Democrats on the committee immediately criticized Starr for withholding all these findings until after the 1998 Congressional elections.)

Starr explicitly did not exonerate Hillary Clinton, however; her case remained unsettled. More time passed. By 2000, she was a candidate for United States Senator from New York, and Starr had been replaced as Independent Counsel by prosecutor Robert Ray, who once worked for Rudy Giuliani, Clinton's then-opponent in the Senate race. Regardless, Ray vowed his investigation would have "no untoward effect on the political process." Ray was determined to wrap up the case before the end of Bill Clinton's term.

On June 23, 2000, the suspense ended when Ray submitted the final Independent Counsel report on the travel office affair under seal to the judicial panel in charge of the investigation and publicly announced that he would seek no criminal charges against Hillary Clinton. Ray said that she had, contrary to her statements, "ultimately influenced" the decision to fire the employees. However, "the evidence was insufficient to prove to a jury beyond a reasonable doubt that any of Mrs. Clinton's statements and testimony regarding her involvement in the travel office firings were knowingly false," and thus prosecution was declined. White House press secretary Joe Lockhart was critical of Ray's statement: "By inappropriately characterizing the results of a legally sealed report through innuendo, the Office of Independent Counsel has further politicized an investigation that has dragged on far too long."

Ray's full 243-page report was unsealed and made public on October 18, 2000, three weeks before the Senatorial election. It confirmed that neither Hillary Clinton nor David Watkins would be indicted. It included some new detail, including a somewhat unsubstantiated claim from a friend of Watkins saying that the First Lady had told Watkins to "fire the sons of bitches." Ray cited eight separate conversations between the First Lady and senior staff and concluded: "Mrs. Clinton’s input into the process was significant, if not the significant factor influencing the pace of events in the Travel Office firings and the ultimate decision to fire the employees." Moreover, Ray determined Hillary Clinton had given "factually false" testimony when questioned by the GAO, the Independent Counsel, and Congress about the travel office firings, but reiterated that "the evidence was insufficient to prove beyond a reasonable doubt" that she knew her statements were false or understood that they may have prompted the firings.

Immediate reactions to the report differed. David E. Kendall, Hillary Clinton's lawyer, said that Ray's words were "highly unfair and misleading" and that Ray's conclusions were inconsistent, that evidence regarding her innocence had been buried in the document, and that the report confirmed that her fears about financial improprieties in the Travel Office were warranted. On the other hand, Bill Powers, chair of the New York Republican State Committee, said the report "once again makes us question" the believability of Clinton, and Congressman Rick Lazio, her Republican opponent in the Senate election, said "We believe that character counts in public service." New York Times columnist Safire updated his description of Hillary Clinton to "habitual prevaricator", saying "the evidence that she has been lying all along is damning" and comparing her dark side to that of Richard Nixon, in whose White House he had once worked.

== Legacy ==
In the legal aftermath, Swidler & Berlin v. United States became an important Supreme Court decision. The length, expense, and results of the Travelgate and the other investigations grouped under the Whitewater umbrella turned much of the public against the Independent Counsel mechanism. As such, the Independent Counsel law expired in 1999, with critics saying it cost too much with too few results; even Kenneth Starr favored the law's demise.

Opinions would differ over the legacy of the affair. Some agreed with Safire, who had said that Hillary Clinton was "a vindictive power player who used the FBI to ruin the lives of people standing in the way of juicy patronage." Conservative commentator Barbara Olson would entitle her highly unflattering 1999 book Hell to Pay: The Unfolding Story of Hillary Rodham Clinton, in reference to Clinton's Travelgate phrase. Bill Clinton later described the allegations and investigation as "a fraud", while in her 2003 autobiography Hillary Clinton gave short shrift to the matter, never mentioning Billy Dale by name and saying that "'Travelgate'... was perhaps worthy of a two- or three-week life span; instead, in a partisan political climate, it became the first manifestation of an obsession for investigation that persisted into the next millennium." Many in the Clinton inner circle would always believe that political motivations had been behind the investigation, including an attempt to derail Hillary Clinton's role in the 1993 health care reform plan. But associate White House counsel William Kennedy would also later reflect that some of it was just "pure palpable hatred of the Clintons. It started and it never quit."
