= Becky Corman =

Rebecca Corman is an American prominent political consultant from Centre County, Pennsylvania. She is a Republican grassroots organizer for Central Pennsylvania, wife of former senator Doyle Corman and mother of senator Jake Corman.

She worked as a grassroots organizer for "just about every successful statewide Republican candidate."

PoliticsPA listed her as one of Pennsylvania's Smartest Staffers and Operatives, describing her as "[one of the best] GOP grassroots campaign organizers" as well as to the list of Pennsylvania's Most Politically Powerful Women.
