= Daniel A. Bailey =

American politician

Member of the Pennsylvania Senate from the 34th district
- In office January 1, 1963 – June 4, 1970
- Preceded by: Jo Hays
- Succeeded by: Joseph S. Ammerman

Personal details
- Born: June 5, 1894
- Died: June 4, 1970 (aged 75)

Daniel A. Bailey (June 5, 1894 – June 4, 1970) served in the Pennsylvania State Senate from 1963 to 1970.
