= Clinton–Lewinsky scandal =

1998 American political sex scandal

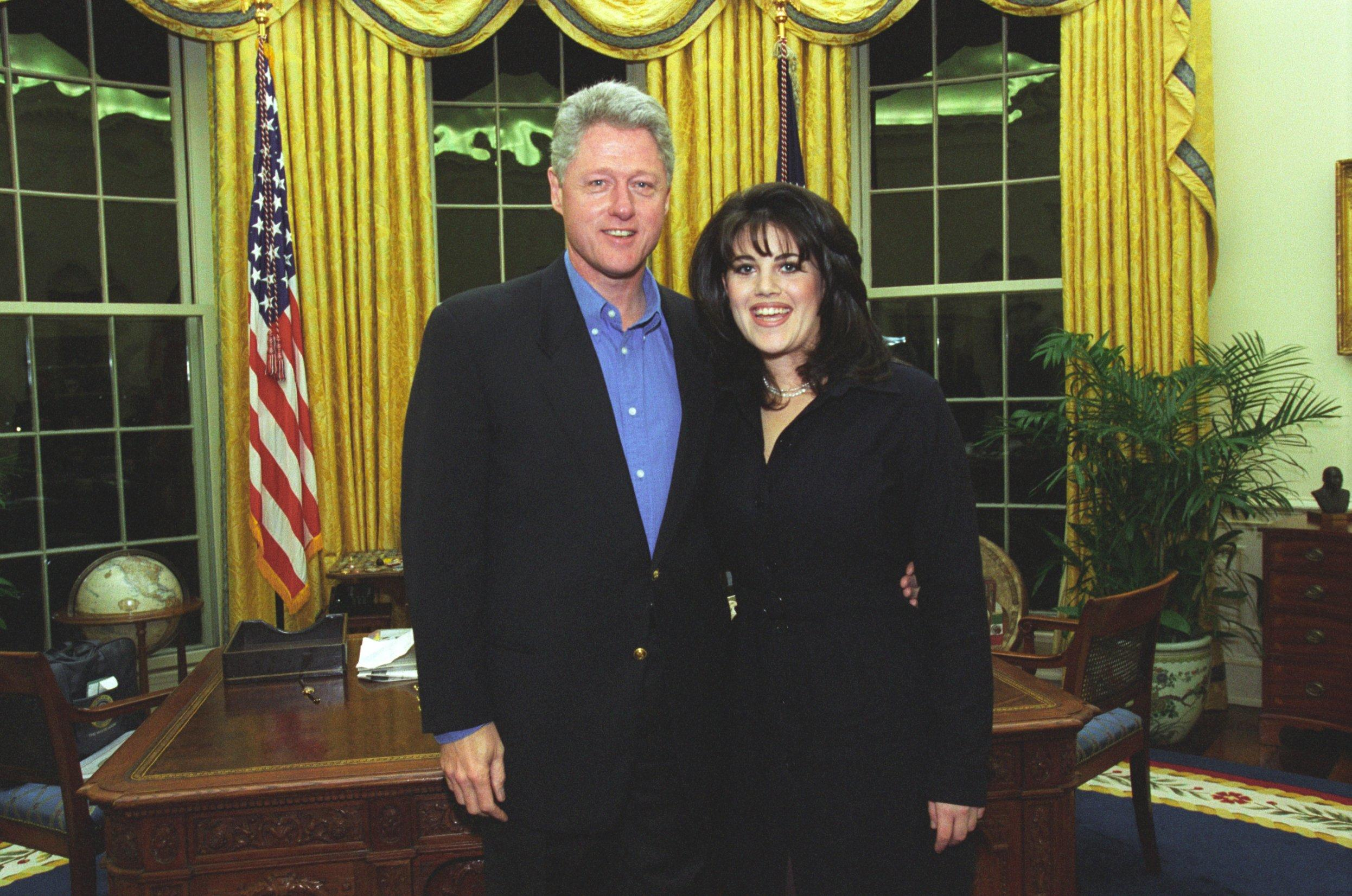
Clinton with Lewinsky in February 1997

A sex scandal involving Bill Clinton, the 42nd president of the United States, and Monica Lewinsky, a White House intern, erupted in 1998. Their sexual relationship began in 1995—when Clinton was 49 years old and Lewinsky was 22 years old—and lasted 18 months, ending in 1997. Clinton ended televised remarks on January 26, 1998, with the later infamous statement: "I did not have sexual relations with that woman, Ms. Lewinsky." Further investigation led to charges of perjury and to the impeachment of Clinton in December 1998 by the U.S. House of Representatives. In February 1999, he was subsequently acquitted on both impeachment charges of perjury and obstruction of justice in a 21-day U.S. Senate trial.

Clinton was held in civil contempt of court by Judge Susan Webber Wright for giving misleading testimony in the Paula Jones case regarding Lewinsky, and was also fined $90,000 by Wright. His license to practice law was suspended in Arkansas for five years; shortly thereafter, he was disbarred from presenting cases in front of the U.S. Supreme Court.

Lewinsky was a graduate of Lewis & Clark College. She was hired during Clinton's first term in 1995 as an intern at the White House through the White House Internship Program and was later an employee of the White House Office of Legislative Affairs. It is believed that Clinton began a personal relationship with her while she worked at the White House, the details of which she later confided to Linda Tripp, her Defense Department co-worker who secretly recorded their telephone conversations.

In January 1998, Tripp discovered that Lewinsky had sworn an affidavit in the Paula Jones case, denying a relationship with Clinton. She delivered tapes to Ken Starr, the independent counsel who was investigating Clinton on other matters, including the Whitewater controversy, the White House FBI files controversy, and the White House travel office controversy. During the grand jury testimony, Clinton's responses were carefully worded, and he argued "it depends on what the meaning of the word is is", with regard to the truthfulness of his statement that "there is not a sexual relationship, an improper sexual relationship or any other kind of improper relationship". Later, in August 1998, Clinton admitted to having had an affair with Lewinsky.

This scandal has sometimes been referred to as "Monicagate", "Lewinskygate", "Tailgate", "Sexgate", and "Zippergate", following the "-gate" construction that has been used since the Watergate scandal.

== Allegations of sexual contact ==
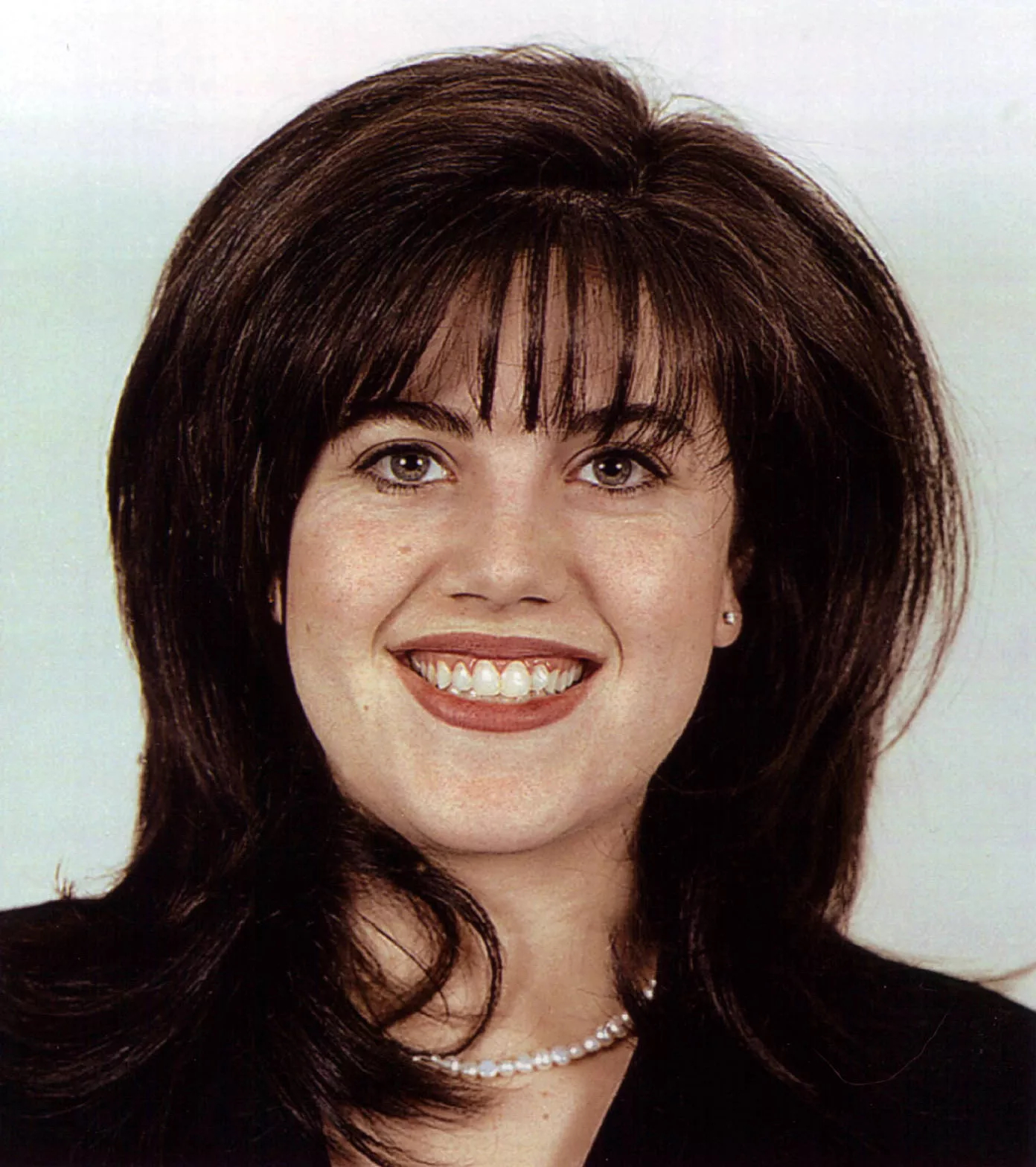
Monica Lewinsky in May 1997

Lewinsky said she had sexual encounters with Bill Clinton on nine occasions from November 1995 to March 1997. According to her published schedule, First Lady Hillary Clinton was at the White House for at least some portion of seven of those days.

In April 1996, Lewinsky's superiors relocated her job to the Pentagon, because they felt she was spending too much time around Clinton. According to his autobiography, then-United Nations Ambassador Bill Richardson was asked by the White House in 1997 to interview Lewinsky for a job on his staff at the United Nations. Richardson did so, and offered her a position, which she declined. The American Spectator alleged that Richardson knew more about the Lewinsky affair than he declared to the grand jury.

Lewinsky confided in Linda Tripp about her relationship with Clinton. Tripp persuaded Lewinsky to save the gifts Clinton had given her, and not to dry-clean a semen-stained blue dress to keep it as an "insurance policy." Tripp reported their conversations to literary agent Lucianne Goldberg, who advised her to secretly record them; Tripp began doing so in September 1997. Goldberg also urged Tripp to take the tapes to Independent Counsel Kenneth Starr and bring them to the attention of people working on the Paula Jones case. In the fall of 1997, Goldberg began speaking to reporters (including Michael Isikoff of Newsweek) about the tapes.

In the Paula Jones case, Lewinsky had submitted an affidavit that denied any physical relationship with Clinton. In January 1998, she attempted to persuade Tripp to commit perjury in the Jones case. Instead, Tripp gave the tapes to Starr, who was investigating the Whitewater controversy and other matters. Starr was now armed with evidence of Lewinsky's admission of a physical relationship with Clinton, and he broadened the investigation to include Lewinsky and her possible perjury in the Jones case.

== Denial and subsequent admission ==
Remarks including response to Monica Lewinsky scandal (January 26, 1998)
Bill Clinton making a presentation that ends with a short commentary on the Monica Lewinsky scandal. The presentation is known for the quote "I did not have sexual relations with that woman, Miss Lewinsky." (6:20)

Remarks including response to Monica Lewinsky scandal (January 26, 1998)
audio only version

News of the scandal first broke on January 17, 1998, on the Drudge Report, which reported that Newsweek editors were sitting on a story by investigative reporter Michael Isikoff exposing the affair. The story broke in the mainstream press on January 21 in The Washington Post. The story swirled for several days and, despite swift denials from Clinton, the clamor for answers from the White House grew louder. On January 26, President Clinton, standing with his wife, spoke at a White House press conference, and issued a denial in which he said:

Now, I have to go back to work on my State of the Union speech. And I worked on it until pretty late last night. But I want to say one thing to the American people. I want you to listen to me. I'm going to say this again: I did not have sexual relations with that woman, Miss Lewinsky. I never told anybody to lie, not a single time; never. These allegations are false. And I need to go back to work for the American people. Thank you.

Pundits debated whether Clinton would address the allegations in his State of the Union Address. Ultimately, he chose not to mention them. Hillary Clinton remained supportive of her husband throughout the scandal. On January 27, in an appearance on NBC's Today she said, "The great story here for anybody willing to find it and write about it and explain it is this vast right-wing conspiracy that has been conspiring against my husband since the day he announced for president."

For the next several months and through the summer, the media debated whether or not an affair had occurred and whether or not Clinton had lied or obstructed justice, but nothing could be definitively established beyond the taped recordings because Lewinsky was unwilling to discuss the affair or testify about it. On July 28, 1998, a substantial delay after the public break of the scandal, Lewinsky received transactional immunity in exchange for grand jury testimony concerning her relationship with Clinton. She also turned over a semen-stained blue dress (which Tripp had encouraged her to save without dry cleaning) to the Starr investigators. The FBI tested the dress and matched the semen stains to a blood sample from Clinton, thereby providing unambiguous circumstantial evidence that proved the relationship despite Clinton's official denials.

Clinton admitted in a taped grand jury testimony on August 17, 1998, that he had engaged in an "improper physical relationship" with Lewinsky. That evening he gave a nationally televised statement admitting that his relationship with Lewinsky was "not appropriate".

On August 20, 1998, three days after Clinton testified on the Monica Lewinsky scandal, Operation Infinite Reach launched missile attacks against al-Qaeda bases in Khost, Afghanistan, and the Al-Shifa pharmaceutical factory in Khartoum, Sudan, in retaliation for the 1998 United States embassy bombings. Some countries, media outlets, protesters, and Republicans accused Clinton of ordering the attacks as a diversion. The attacks also drew parallels to the then-recently released movie Wag the Dog, which features a fictional president faking a war in Albania to distract attention from a sex scandal. Administration officials denied any connection between the missile strikes and the ongoing scandal, and 9/11 Commission investigators found no reason to dispute those statements. The missile strikes also caused antisemitic canards to spread in the Middle East that Lewinsky was a Jewish agent sent to influence Clinton against supporting the Palestinians. This conspiracy theory would influence Mohamed Atta, the ringleader of al-Qaeda's Hamburg cell and the September 11 attacks.

== Perjury charges ==
In his deposition for the Jones lawsuit, Clinton denied having had sexual relations with Lewinsky. Based on the evidence—a blue dress with Clinton's semen, and confirmed by DNA testing, that Lewinsky provided—Starr concluded that the president's sworn testimony was perjurious. There were multiple sworn statements that Starr considered to be lies, but two statements have become particularly famous because of Clinton's very technical defense of them.

=== Defining sexual relations ===
During the deposition, Clinton was asked "Have you ever had sexual relations with Monica Lewinsky, as that term is defined in Deposition Exhibit 1?" The judge let Clinton review the definition, which stated,

a person engages in ‘‘sexual relations’’ when the person knowingly engages in or causes contact with the genitalia, anus, groin, breast, inner thigh, or buttocks of any person with an intent to arouse or gratify the sexual desire of any person

Afterwards, based on the definition of "sexual relations" as provided by the Independent Counsel's Office, Clinton answered, "I have never had sexual relations with Monica Lewinsky." Clinton later said,

"I thought the definition included any activity by [me], where [I] was the actor and came in contact with those parts of the bodies" which had been explicitly listed (and "with an intent to gratify or arouse the sexual desire of any person").

In other words, Clinton denied that he had ever contacted Lewinsky's "genitalia, anus, groin, breast, inner thigh, or buttocks", and effectively claimed that the agreed-upon definition of "sexual relations" included giving oral sex but excluded receiving oral sex.

=== The meaning of the word 'is' ===
In the deposition, Clinton's lawyer had quoted Lewinsky's statement that "there is absolutely no sex of any kind in any manner, shape or form, with President Clinton". Clinton later defended this as true because,

It depends on what the meaning of the word ‘is’ is. If the—if he—if ‘is’ means is and never has been, that is not—that is one thing. If it means there is none, that was a completely true statement. [...] Now, if someone had asked me on that day, are you having any kind of sexual relations with Ms. Lewinsky, that is, asked me a question in the present tense, I would have said no. And it would have been completely true.

The Starr report did not consider this particular statement perjurious, but gave it as an example of how Clinton "construes some words narrowly", and one journalist highlighted it as a "defining moment" showing Clinton's slickness.

=== Civil contempt of court ===
Two months after the Senate failed to convict him, President Clinton was held in civil contempt of court by Judge Susan Webber Wright for giving misleading testimony regarding his sexual relationship with Lewinsky, and was also fined $90,000 by Wright. Clinton declined to appeal the civil contempt of court ruling, citing financial problems, but still maintained that his testimony complied with Wright's earlier definition of sexual relations. In 2001, his license to practice law was suspended in Arkansas for five years and later by the United States Supreme Court.

== Impeachment ==
In December 1998, Clinton's Democratic Party was in the minority in both chambers of Congress. A few Democratic members of Congress, and most in the opposition Republican Party, claimed that Clinton's giving false testimony and allegedly influencing Lewinsky's testimony were crimes of obstruction of justice and perjury and thus impeachable offenses. After a delay due to a brief bombing campaign in Iraq, the House of Representatives voted to issue two Articles of Impeachment against him which was followed by a 21-day trial in the Senate.

Clinton was acquitted on both counts as neither received the necessary two-thirds majority vote of the senators present. Between 45 and 50 senators voted to convict, depending on the charge, short of the 67 votes needed for conviction and removal from office. All the Democrats in the Senate voted for acquittal on both the perjury and the obstruction of justice charges. Ten Republicans voted for acquittal for perjury: John Chafee (Rhode Island), Susan Collins (Maine), Slade Gorton (Washington), Jim Jeffords (Vermont), Richard Shelby (Alabama), Olympia Snowe (Maine), Arlen Specter (Pennsylvania), Ted Stevens (Alaska), Fred Thompson (Tennessee), and John Warner (Virginia). Five Republicans voted for acquittal for obstruction of justice: Chafee, Collins, Jeffords, Snowe, and Specter.

President Clinton was thereby acquitted of all charges and remained in office. There were attempts to censure the president by the House of Representatives, but those attempts failed.

== Aftermath ==
=== Effect on 2000 presidential election ===
The scandal affected the 2000 U.S. presidential election in two different ways. Democratic Party candidate and sitting vice president Al Gore said that Clinton's scandal had been "a drag" that deflated the enthusiasm of their party's base, and had the effect of reducing Democratic votes. Clinton said the scandal had made Gore's campaign too cautious, and that if Clinton had been allowed to campaign for Gore in Arkansas and New Hampshire, either state would have delivered Gore's needed electoral votes regardless of the effects of the Florida recount controversy.

Political analysts have supported both views. Before and after the 2000 election, John Cochran of ABC News connected the Lewinsky scandal with a voter phenomenon he called "Clinton fatigue". Polling showed that the scandal continued to affect Clinton's low personal approval ratings through the election, and analysts such as Vanderbilt University's John G. Geer later concluded "Clinton fatigue or a kind of moral retrospective voting had a significant impact on Gore's chances". Other analysts sided with Clinton's argument, and argued that Gore's refusal to have Clinton campaign with him damaged his appeal.

=== Collateral scandals ===
During the scandal, supporters of Clinton opined that the matter should remain private, and called some supporting Clinton's impeachment "hypocritical". A highly publicized investigation campaign actively sought information that might embarrass politicians who supported impeachment. According to the British newspaper The Guardian,

Larry Flynt ... the publisher of Hustler magazine, offered a $1 million reward ... Flynt was a sworn enemy of the Republican party [and] sought to dig up dirt on the Republican members of Congress who were leading the impeachment campaign against President Clinton. [... Although] Flynt claimed at the time to have the goods on up to a dozen prominent Republicans, the ad campaign helped to bring down only one. Robert Livingston—a congressman from Louisiana ... abruptly retired after learning that Mr. Flynt was about to reveal that he had also had an affair.

Henry Hyde, Republican chair of the House Judiciary Committee and lead House manager, also had an affair while in office as a state legislator. Hyde, aged 70 during the Lewinsky hearings, dismissed it as a "youthful indiscretion" (he had been 41).

Republican congressman Bob Livingston had been widely expected to become Speaker of the United States House of Representatives in the next Congressional session. Then just weeks away after Flynt revealed the affair, Livingston resigned and challenged Clinton to do the same.

Bob Barr (R-GA) another Republican House manager, had an extramarital affair. Barr had been the first lawmaker in either chamber to call for Clinton's resignation due to the Lewinsky affair. Barr lost a primary challenge less than three years after the impeachment proceedings.

Dan Burton (R-IN) said, "No one, regardless of what party they serve, no one, regardless of what branch of government they serve, should be allowed to get away with these alleged sexual improprieties ..." In 1998, Burton admitted that he himself had had an affair in 1983 which produced a child.

Newt Gingrich (R-GA) US Representative, Speaker of the House and leader of the Republican Revolution of 1994, admitted in 1998 to having had an affair with then House Agriculture Committee staffer Callista Bisek while he was still married to his second wife, at the same time as he was leading the impeachment of Bill Clinton for perjury regarding an affair with intern Monica Lewinsky.

Steven C. LaTourette (R-OH) US Representative, voted to impeach Bill Clinton for the Lewinsky scandal while he was having a long-term affair with his chief of staff, Jennifer Laptook.

Republican Helen Chenoweth-Hage from Idaho aggressively called for the resignation of President Clinton and then admitted to her own six-year affair with a married rancher during the 1980s.

=== Personal acceptance ===
Historian Taylor Branch implied that Clinton had requested changes to his 2009 biography, The Clinton Tapes: Wrestling History with the President, regarding Clinton's revelation that the Lewinsky affair began because "I cracked; I just cracked." Branch writes that Clinton had felt "beleaguered, unappreciated, and open to a liaison with Lewinsky" following "the Democrats' loss of Congress in the November 1994 elections, the death of his mother the previous January, and the ongoing Whitewater investigation". Publicly, Clinton had previously blamed the affair on "a terrible moral error" and on anger at Republicans, stating, "if people have unresolved anger, it makes them do non-rational, destructive things".

== Legacy and retrospective assessment ==
The Clinton–Lewinsky scandal was subject to widespread media coverage, resulting in considerable difficulties for Monica Lewinsky later in life as she attempted to find employment. In 2014, she publicly re-emerged as an activist against cyberbullying and public shaming after writing the essay Shame and Survival for Vanity Fair. Subsequently, several prominent media figures who had covered or mocked Lewinsky during the scandal expressed regret at their role in it. David Letterman remarked "I feel bad about my role in helping push the humiliation to the point of suffocation".

== See also ==
- Bill Clinton sexual assault and misconduct allegations
  - Relationship of Bill Clinton and Jeffrey Epstein
- List of federal political scandals in the United States
- List of federal political sex scandals in the United States
- List of individual dresses
- Second-term curse
- Stormy Daniels–Donald Trump scandal
- Sex addiction
