= Robin Lovitt =

American convicted murderer (born 1963)

Robin McKennel Lovitt (born November 6, 1963) is a convicted murderer in the U.S. state of Virginia. He was sentenced to death, after being convicted of the November 18, 1998, stabbing murder of Clayton Dicks in Arlington County, Virginia. Lovitt was granted clemency by Virginia Governor Mark R. Warner on November 29, 2005, the day before he was scheduled to be executed by lethal injection at the Greensville Correctional Center.

Robin Lovitt would have been the first person executed by the Commonwealth of Virginia since James Edward Reid on September 9, 2004. It would have been the 1000th execution in the United States since the Supreme Court ruled in Gregg v. Georgia that new capital punishment laws were constitutionally permissible in 1976.

== Murder ==
Clayton Dicks was a manager at an Arlington pool hall, working the night shift. He was the only employee there from 3 a.m. onwards. Casel Lucas, an inmate who befriended Lovitt in prison testified that Lovitt told him that he hid in a bathroom until he knew there would be no other people in the pool hall. He then went to open the cash register but was disturbed by Dicks. Lovitt had previously worked as a cook at the pool hall. The manager, Amy Hudon, said that he had helped her pry open the cash register with scissors a few months before the murder. Lovitt ceased working there about two months before the murder.

Jose Alverado and Carlos Clavell entered the pool hall at 3:25 a.m. and witnessed two men fighting behind the counter. One of the men fighting proceeded to stab the other with a silver-colored weapon and then kicked him as he lay on the ground. Alverado and Clavell said that they ran from the pool hall to a service station and rang 9-1-1. Dicks was stabbed five times in his chest and once in his back. Four of these wounds were lethal. He was still alive when paramedics arrived but died after reaching hospital.

Police found that the cash register had been broken into and one of its money boxes was missing. A canine unit located a pair of bloodied, orange-handled scissors nearby that were identified as being a pair that were kept next to the cash register. DNA testing showed that the blood on them was from Dicks. Lovitt's cousin testified that Lovitt had come to his house on the night of November 18 carrying a metal box, which they opened with a screwdriver and split the money. Lovitt told police that he had seen a Hispanic man stabbing Dicks, and then took the cash box, which was lying on the floor of the pool hall. A forensic scientist testified that the cash box that was at the cousin's house came from the cash register at the pool hall.

== Trial and appeals ==
Lovitt was arrested on November 24, 1998, and convicted by a jury of capital murder during the commission of a robbery on September 20, 1999.

Lovitt appealed his conviction on the basis that there is no physical evidence linking him to the crime. He claims the entire case is based on circumstantial evidence and the testimony of witnesses, one of whom was a prisoner. Jose Alverado was only 80% certain that the man he saw fighting behind the counter was Lovitt. Witness testimony was contradictory and according to Lovitt and his lawyers, the evidence in the case just as easily points to Jose Alverado and Carlos Clavell being the murderers.

Casel Lucas, the prisoner who testified is a drug addict, who had been convicted of a dozen felonies including attempted rape. It was not revealed to the jury that this was the fifth time that Lucas has testified in cases involving people whom he befriended in prison.

On May 2, 2001, a new law came into effect in Virginia that required all biological evidence in capital cases to be sent to a state laboratory for safe-keeping. But less than three weeks later, Robert C. McCarthy, Chief Deputy Clerk of the Circuit Court of Arlington County had the evidence in the Lovitt case destroyed. Two other clerks said they told McCarthy not to order the destruction of the evidence because it was a capital case. McCarthy told them that he thought he was authorized to destroy the trial exhibits after Lovitt's convictions were affirmed by the Supreme Court of Virginia.

In October 2000, Lovitt's case was taken up on a pro bono basis by the law firm of Kirkland & Ellis. Kirkland worked with the University of Notre Dame's Washington Semester Program in pursuing Lovitt's appeals. Lovitt was also represented by the Virginia Capital Representation Resource Center. When Kirkland began representing Lovitt, Kenneth Starr, former United States Solicitor General, became involved in the case. Starr is pro-capital punishment and has stated that:

... the death penalty has to be administered with the utmost caution and reserved for the gravest offenses. This is not that kind of case. Robin Lovitt maintains his innocence, and evidence that might prove his innocence has been destroyed. I'm very distressed by that. ... Society had better be absolutely certain before they put someone to death who is maintaining his innocence. I feel very passionately about that.

The Supreme Court of Virginia, the U.S. District Court for the Eastern District of Virginia and the United States Court of Appeals for the Fourth Circuit have all denied his appeals for overturning his conviction since the evidence has been destroyed. The 4th Circuit Court of Appeals said they would only overturn if it could be shown that McCarthy acted in "bad faith."

His execution was originally scheduled for July 11, 2005, but was stayed by the Supreme Court of the United States to give themselves more time to consider his appeal. They decided not to hear the case again, resulting in a new execution date of November 30, 2005, being set.

Little more than 24 hours before the execution Governor Mark R. Warner commuted Lovitt's sentence to life in prison without parole. He said that the destruction of evidence was improper and:

... The actions of an agent of the Commonwealth, in a manner contrary to the express direction of the law, comes at the expense of a defendant facing society's most severe and final sanction. ... The commonwealth must ensure that every time this ultimate sanction is carried out, it is done fairly.

It was the first time Warner had granted clemency during his governorship.

It was revealed during the penalty phase of the trial that Lovitt had been charged with assault and placed in protective supervision at age of 11 in October 1975. Then in August 1979 he was charged with burglary and larceny. Between 1983 and the murder he was convicted multiple times of larceny, burglary and possession of marijuana and cocaine.

As of December 2022, Robin Lovitt is incarcerated at the Buckingham Correctional Center. His Virginia inmate identification number is 1171821.

== See also ==
- Capital punishment in Virginia
- Capital punishment in the United States
