= William Clinger =

American politician (1929–2021)

Bill Clinger
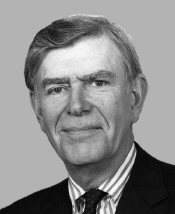

Chair of the House Oversight Committee
- In office January 3, 1995 – January 3, 1997
- Preceded by: John Conyers
- Succeeded by: Dan Burton

Member of the U.S. House of Representatives from Pennsylvania
- In office January 3, 1979 – January 3, 1997
- Preceded by: Joseph Ammerman
- Succeeded by: John Peterson
- Constituency: 23rd district (1979–1993); 5th district (1993–1997)

Personal details
- Born: William Floyd Clinger Jr. April 4, 1929 Warren, Pennsylvania, U.S.
- Died: May 28, 2021 (aged 92) Naples, Florida, U.S.
- Party: Republican
- Spouse: Julia Whitla (m. 1952; died 2016)
- Education: Johns Hopkins University (BA); University of Virginia (LLB)

Military service
- Branch/service: United States Navy
- Years of service: 1951–1955

William Floyd Clinger Jr. (April 4, 1929 – May 28, 2021) was an American attorney and Republican politician who represented northwest and north-central Pennsylvania in the U.S. House of Representatives from 1979 to 1997.

== Early life and education ==
Clinger was born in Warren, Pennsylvania, the son of Lella May (Hunter) and William F. Clinger. He attended the public schools there and graduated from The Hill School in 1947. He earned a Bachelor of Arts degree from Johns Hopkins University in 1951 and a Bachelor of Laws from the University of Virginia in 1965.

== Career ==
Clinger served as an officer in the United States Navy from 1951 to 1955. He was a delegate to the Pennsylvania state constitutional convention, 1967 to 1968, and the Republican National Convention in 1972. Clinger was associated with the New Process Company of Warren, Pennsylvania from 1955 to 1962, was admitted to the Pennsylvania bar in 1965, and was a lawyer in private practice.

=== U.S. House of Representatives ===
Defeating incumbent Representative Joseph S. Ammerman, Clinger was elected as a Republican to the 96th and to the eight succeeding Congresses (January 3, 1979 – January 3, 1997). While in the House of Representatives, he was chairman of the United States House Committee on Government Reform and Oversight in the 104th Congress, which was quite active in investigating the Travelgate and Filegate matters. In addition, he served as vice chairman of the United States House Committee on Transportation and Infrastructure and ranking member on the Subcommittee on Aviation. Along with then-Senator William Cohen, Clinger co-authored the Information Technology Management Reform Act, also known as the Clinger-Cohen Act. He was not a candidate for re-election to the 105th Congress in 1996.

=== Later life ===
After his retirement from Congress, Clinger served as the chairman for the Chautauqua Institution's board of trustees. He was a senior fellow at Johns Hopkins University's Center for Advanced Governmental Studies and co-chairman of the board of directors for the Institute for Representative Government. He was also a member of the ReFormers Caucus of Issue One.

In October 2016, Clinger was one of thirty Republican ex-lawmakers to sign a public letter condemning GOP presidential nominee (and future president) Donald Trump as "manifestly unqualified to be president." Clinger died at the age of 92 on May 28, 2021.

U.S. House of Representatives
| Preceded by Joseph Ammerman | Member of the U.S. House of Representatives from Pennsylvania's 23rd congressional district 1979–1993 | Constituency abolished |
| Preceded by Richard Schulze | Member of the U.S. House of Representatives from Pennsylvania's 5th congressional district 1993–1997 | Succeeded by John Peterson |
| Preceded by Frank Horton | Ranking Member of the House Oversight Committee; 1993–1995 | Succeeded by Cardiss Collins |
| Preceded by John Conyers | Chair of the House Oversight Committee; 1995–1997 | Succeeded by Dan Burton |
