= Leon Silverman =

21st-century American lawyer and government official

- Born: 21 June 1921; Manhattan, New York City, New York, U.S.
- Died: 29 January 2015 (aged 93); Great Neck, New York
- Education: Townsend Harris High School; Brooklyn College
- Alma mater: Yale Law School; London School of Economics
- Occupations: Lawyer; government official
- Employer: Fried, Frank, Harris, Shriver & Jacobson
- Known for: Special Prosecutor into Raymond J. Donovan alleged ties with organized crime
- Board member of: American College of Trial Lawyers; Supreme Court Historical Society; Legal Aid Society of New York
- Spouse: Rita Schwartz (m. 1949)
- Children: 2

Assistant U.S. Attorney (Manhattan)
- In office 1953–1956

Assistant Deputy U.S. Attorney General
- In office 1957–1959
- President: Dwight D. Eisenhower
- Military career
- Allegiance: United States
- Branch: Army
- Service years: –1945
- Conflicts: World War II

Leon Silverman (June 21, 1921 – January 29, 2015) was an American lawyer and government official. A senior partner and later chairman of the law firm Fried, Frank, Harris, Shriver & Jacobson, Silverman was a prominent litigator known for representing high-profile clients such as Ivan Boesky and Sears, Roebuck & Company. He gained national prominence in 1981 when he was appointed as the Special Prosecutor to investigate United States Secretary of Labor Raymond J. Donovan regarding alleged ties to organized crime.

Throughout his career, Silverman served as president of the American College of Trial Lawyers, the Supreme Court Historical Society, and the Legal Aid Society of New York.

== Biography ==
=== Early life and education ===
Silverman was born on June 21, 1921, in Manhattan to Jewish immigrants from Poland. His father died when Silverman was three years old, and he was raised in Borough Park, Brooklyn, by his mother, a seamstress, and his grandparents.

He attended Townsend Harris High School and Brooklyn College. He earned his law degree from Yale Law School, where in 1948 he authored an influential note titled "Segregation in Public Schools," which argued that "separate but equal" laws were a denial of equal protection—a legal theory that predated Brown v. Board of Education by six years. He later attended the London School of Economics, where he studied under political theorist Harold Laski.

During World War II, Silverman served in the United States Army. While stationed in Wales, he met his future wife, Rita Schwartz.

=== Legal career ===
Silverman joined the law firm now known as Fried, Frank, Harris, Shriver & Jacobson (then known as Riegelman, Strasser, Schwarz & Spiegelberg) in 1949, where he was mentored by George A. Spiegelberg. He eventually became a senior litigation partner and chairman of the firm.

He also served in the public sector. Hired by J. Edward Lumbard as an Assistant U.S. Attorney in Manhattan, Silverman rose to become assistant chief of the civil division before returning to private practice in 1956. He later served as an assistant deputy U.S. Attorney General, where he was involved in the legal efforts to desegregate schools in Little Rock, Arkansas, in the late 1950s.

His notable cases included:

- representation of stock arbitrager Ivan Boesky in 1987, during insider trading scandals. Silverman negotiated Boesky’s plea agreement, which included a then-record $100 million penalty. During sentencing, Silverman argued for leniency by highlighting Boesky’s cooperation with the government to reveal systemic corruption in financial markets.
- served as counsel for the NAACP Legal Defense and Educational Fund in the landmark Supreme Court case Bob Jones University v. United States (1983). The Court ruled that the IRS could revoke the tax-exempt status of private schools that practiced racial discrimination.
- successfully defended Sears, Roebuck & Company against antitrust charges and was appointed by a federal bankruptcy judge to manage asbestos liability claims for the Johns Manville Corporation.
- representation of the Legal Aid Society of New York before the Supreme Court of the United States in Blum v. Stenson (1984) where the Court ruled unanimously in his client's favor, establishing that nonprofit legal service organizations are entitled to attorney's fees based on prevailing market rates rather than their internal costs.

On December 29, 1981, a panel of three federal judges appointed Silverman as Special Prosecutor to investigate Labor Secretary Raymond J. Donovan following allegations that Donovan had ties to organized crime and had witnessed a payoff to a union leader. Silverman conducted two separate inquiries and filed a comprehensive report on June 28, 1982, concluding that there was "insufficient credible evidence" to prosecute Donovan. While the findings allowed Donovan to remain in office, Silverman publicly clarified that his conclusion was not an exoneration, but a statement that the evidence did not meet the threshold for federal prosecution. Donovan was later indicted on separate state charges in 1984.

=== Professional leadership ===
Silverman held leadership positions in several major legal organizations:

- President, American College of Trial Lawyers (1982–1983)
- President, Legal Aid Society of New York
- President, Supreme Court Historical Society: He served as president and chairman of the board of trustees for over 22 years.

== Legacy and honors ==
In 2002, the Supreme Court Historical Society established the Leon Silverman Lecture Series in his honor. The series is held annually at the Supreme Court building and features lectures on constitutional history introduced by sitting Supreme Court Justices.

Upon his death in 2015, Justice Ruth Bader Ginsburg paid tribute to him, stating: "Leon Silverman was a prince among lawyers... [he] devoted much of his time to advancing the cause of justice, to make it equal and accessible to all."

== Personal life ==
Silverman married Rita Schwartz in 1949 and they had two daughters. He died on January 29, 2015, in Great Neck, New York, aged 93 years.
