= Doyle Corman =

American politician (1932–2019)

Member of the Pennsylvania Senate from the 34th district
- In office June 7, 1977 – November 30, 1998
- Preceded by: Joseph S. Ammerman
- Succeeded by: Jake Corman

Personal details
- Born: Jacob Doyle Corman Jr. September 17, 1932 Pleasant Gap, Pennsylvania
- Died: December 8, 2019 (aged 87) Bellefonte, Pennsylvania
- Party: Republican
- Spouse: Becky Corman
- Children: 5, including Jake Corman
- Education: Indiana University of Pennsylvania

Jacob Doyle Corman Jr. (September 17, 1932 – December 8, 2019) was a member of the Pennsylvania Senate.

Prior to his Senate service, Corman worked in the insurance and real estate business. He also served as Centre County Commissioner from 1968 through 1977. Corman was first elected to represent the 34th senatorial district in the Pennsylvania Senate in 1977, and retired in 1998. He was succeeded in the seat by his son, Jake Corman.

While in the Senate, he served as a member of the Republican State Committee of Pennsylvania.

The political website PoliticsPA described him as "The Godfather of the Centre County GOP." His family, to include his son, State Senator Jake Corman, are among the "most respected political families in Pennsylvania". Corman died on December 8, 2019.
