= List of American Crime Story cast members =

American Crime Story is an American true crime television series developed by Scott Alexander and Larry Karaszewski, who are executive producers with Brad Falchuk, Nina Jacobson, Ryan Murphy, and Brad Simpson. Described as an anthology series, and similarly to American Horror Story, each season is presented as a self-contained miniseries, following separate unrelated true events. Series creators Alexander and Karaszewski did not return after the first season.

The first season, subtitled The People v. O. J. Simpson, presents the murder trial of O. J. Simpson, based on Jeffrey Toobin's book The Run of His Life: The People v. O. J. Simpson. The second season, subtitled The Assassination of Gianni Versace, explores the murder of designer Gianni Versace by serial killer Andrew Cunanan, based on Maureen Orth's book Vulgar Favors: Andrew Cunanan, Gianni Versace, and the Largest Failed Manhunt in U. S. History.

Originally, a season based on Hurricane Katrina was intended to air, and would have featured Sarah Paulson in the role of Dr. Anna Pou, however the season was later scrapped.

== Cast members ==
List indicators
- A green cell indicates the actor as a main cast member.
- A light blue cell indicates the actor as a special guest cast member.
- A red cell indicates the actor as a recurring or a guest cast member.
- A grey cell indicates the actor has not participated in the respective season.

Portrayer	Capacity and character per season		
Portrayer	The People v. O. J. Simpson	The Assassination of Gianni Versace	Impeachment
=== Starring ===
Sterling K. Brown	Christopher Darden		
Kenneth Choi	Lance Ito		
Christian Clemenson	Bill Hodgman		
Cuba Gooding Jr.	O. J. Simpson		
Bruce Greenwood	Gil Garcetti		
Nathan Lane	F. Lee Bailey		
Sarah Paulson	Marcia Clark		Linda Tripp
David Schwimmer	Robert Kardashian		
John Travolta	Robert Shapiro		
Courtney B. Vance	Johnnie Cochran		
Édgar Ramírez		Gianni Versace	
Darren Criss		Andrew Cunanan	
Ricky Martin		Antonio D'Amico	
Penélope Cruz		Donatella Versace	
Beanie Feldstein			Monica Lewinsky
Annaleigh Ashford		Elizabeth Cote	Paula Jones
Margo Martindale			Lucianne Goldberg
Edie Falco			Hillary Clinton
Clive Owen			Bill Clinton
=== Special guest stars ===
Judith Light		Marilyn Miglin	Susan Carpenter-McMillan
Aimee Mann		Bar Singer	
Finn Wittrock		Jeffrey "Jeff" Trail	
=== Guest starring ===
Chris Bauer	Tom Lange		
Selma Blair	Kris Jenner		
Jordana Brewster	Denise Brown		
Connie Britton	Faye Resnick		
Garrett M. Brown	Lou Brown		
Chris Conner	Jeffrey Toobin		
Dale Godboldo	Carl E. Douglas		
Jessica Blair Herman	Kim Goldman		
Billy Magnussen	Kato Kaelin		
Rob Morrow	Barry Scheck		
Robert Morse	Dominick Dunne		
Michael McGrady	Phillip Vannatter		
Angel Parker	Shawn Chapman		
Steven Pasquale	Mark Fuhrman		
Leonard Roberts	Dennis Schatzman		
Keesha Sharp	Dale Cochran		
Joseph Siravo	Fred Goldman		
Joanna P. Adler		Mary Ann Cunanan	
Joe Adler		Jerome Gentes	
Jon Jon Briones		Modesto Cunanan	
Will Chase		Paul Scrimshaw	
Giovanni Cirfiera		Santo Versace	
Mike Farrell		Lee Miglin	
Jay R. Ferguson		Keith Evans	
Cody Fern		David Madson	
Max Greenfield		Ronnie Holston	
Sophie von Haselberg		Linda Elwell	
Christine Horn		Talarah Gruber	
Cathy Moriarty		Vivian Oliva	
Michael Nouri		Norman Blachford	
Dascha Polanco		Lori Wieder	
Terry Sweeney		David Gallo	
José Zúñiga		George Navarro	
Colin Hanks			Mike Emmick
Cobie Smulders			Ann Coulter
Taran Killam			Steve Jones
Elizabeth Reaser			Kathleen Willey
Kevin Pollak			Bernie Nussbaum
George H. Xanthis			George Stephanopoulos
Rae Dawn Chong			Betty Currie
Sarah Catherine Hook			Catherine Allday Davis
Danny Jacobs			Michael Isikoff
George Salazar			George Conway
Billy Eichner			Matt Drudge
Christopher McDonald			Robert S. Bennett
Kim Matula			Laura Ingraham
