= Starr Report =

Government report on President Bill Clinton

On September 9, 1998, the Starr Report was released.

The Starr Report, officially the Referral from Independent Counsel Kenneth W. Starr in Conformity with the Requirement of Title 28, United States Code, Section 595(c), is a United States federal government report by Independent Counsel Ken Starr concerning his investigation of President Bill Clinton. Delivered to the United States Congress on September 9, 1998, the allegations in the report led to the impeachment of Bill Clinton and the five-year suspension of Clinton's law license.

== Background ==
Initially chosen as Independent Counsel in 1994, and charged with investigating Bill and Hillary Clinton's pre-presidency financial dealings with the Whitewater Land Company, Ken Starr, with the approval of Attorney General Janet Reno, conducted a wide-ranging investigation of alleged abuses including the firing of White House travel agents, the alleged misuse of FBI files, and Clinton's conduct while he was a defendant in a sexual harassment lawsuit filed by a former Arkansas state government employee, Paula Jones. In the course of the investigation, Linda Tripp provided Starr with taped phone conversations in which Monica Lewinsky, a former White House Intern, discussed having oral sex with the president. Clinton gave a sworn deposition in the Jones case on January 17, 1998, during which he denied having a "sexual relationship", "sexual affair" or "sexual relations" with Lewinsky. He also denied that he was ever alone with her. Seven months later, on August 17, Clinton faced a federal grand jury, convened by Ken Starr, to consider whether the president committed perjury in his January deposition, or otherwise obstructed justice, in the Jones case. A much-quoted statement from the deposition shows Clinton questioning the precise use of the word "is", saying, "It depends on what the meaning of the word 'is' is. If the—if he—if 'is' means is and never has been, that is not—that is one thing. If it means there is none, that was a completely true statement". Clinton contended that his January statement that "there's nothing going on between us" had been truthful because he had no ongoing relationship with Lewinsky at the time he was questioned. He also stated that oral sex was not, in his opinion, "sexual relations" within the meaning of that term as adopted in the Jones case (i.e. vaginal intercourse).

The Office of the Independent Counsel concluded its four-year-long investigation of the president soon after Clinton's grand jury testimony, and on September 9, 1998, delivered its report to the House Judiciary Committee. Republican House leaders argued for the report's immediate release via the internet, while Democrats appealed for delay in order to allow the White House time to prepare a response. After two days of debate, on September 11, the House voted 363–63 to release the report to the public. When the report, a 453-page document summarizing the evidence against the president, was uploaded to the internet, it became a sensation, with 20 million people (12% of adult Americans) accessing the document at least once. "It's probably the single highest number of people who have ever used the computer to access a single document," David Webber of the Frank Luntz polling company told CNN.

== Summary ==
The long-awaited report cited 11 possible grounds for impeachment in four categories: perjury, obstruction of justice, witness tampering and abuse of power. These allegations all arose from President Clinton's affair with Monica Lewinsky.

In the report's introduction, Starr asserted that Clinton had lied under oath during a sworn deposition on January 17, 1998, while he was a "defendant in a sexual harassment lawsuit" and "to a grand jury." He additionally alleged that Clinton had "attempted to influence the testimony of a grand jury witness who had direct knowledge of facts that would reveal the falsity of his deposition testimony; attempted to obstruct justice by facilitating a witness' plan to refuse to comply with a subpoena; attempted to obstruct justice by encouraging a witness to file an affidavit that the president knew would be false ... ; lied to potential grand jury witnesses, knowing that then they would repeat those lies before the grand jury; and engaged in a pattern on conduct that was inconsistent with his constitutional duty to faithfully execute the laws."

Starr included a detailed timeline of Lewinsky's various sexual encounters with Clinton during her White House internship. He concluded the report with a section entitled "Grounds," where he provided supporting evidence to each of the 11 grounds for potential impeachment of Clinton—including physical evidence such as the DNA test results of a semen stain on a dress owned by Lewinsky which matched Clinton's blood sample. Starr also alleged that Clinton had conversations with witnesses during his investigation which he ascribed as "witness-tampering and obstruction of justice by hiding evidence and giving misleading accounts to lawyers for Paula Jones."

== Stated possible grounds for impeachment ==
Specifically, Starr reported:

There is substantial and credible information supporting the following eleven possible grounds for impeachment:

1. President Clinton lied under oath in his civil case when he denied a sexual affair, a sexual relationship, or sexual relations with Monica Lewinsky.

2. President Clinton lied under oath to the grand jury about his sexual relationship with Ms. Lewinsky.

3. In his civil deposition, to support his false statement about the sexual relationship, President Clinton also lied under oath about being alone with Ms. Lewinsky and about the many gifts exchanged between Ms. Lewinsky and him.

4. President Clinton lied under oath in his civil deposition about his discussions with Ms. Lewinsky concerning her involvement in the Jones case.

5. During the Jones case, the President obstructed justice and had an understanding with Ms. Lewinsky to jointly conceal the truth about their relationship by concealing gifts subpoenaed by Ms. Jones's attorneys.

6. During the Jones case, the President obstructed justice and had an understanding with Ms. Lewinsky to jointly conceal the truth of their relationship from the judicial process by a scheme that included the following means: (i) Both the President and Ms. Lewinsky understood that they would lie under oath in the Jones case about their sexual relationship; (ii) the President suggested to Ms. Lewinsky that she prepare an affidavit that, for the President's purposes, would memorialize her testimony under oath and could be used to prevent questioning of both of them about their relationship; (iii) Ms. Lewinsky signed and filed the false affidavit; (iv) the President used Ms. Lewinsky's false affidavit at his deposition in an attempt to head off questions about Ms. Lewinsky; and (v) when that failed, the President lied under oath at his civil deposition about the relationship with Ms. Lewinsky.

7. President Clinton endeavored to obstruct justice by helping Ms. Lewinsky obtain a job in New York at a time when she would have been a witness harmful to him were she to tell the truth in the Jones case.

8. President Clinton lied under oath in his civil deposition about his discussions with Vernon Jordan concerning Ms. Lewinsky's involvement in the Jones case.

9. The President improperly tampered with a potential witness by attempting to corruptly influence the testimony of his personal secretary, Betty Currie, in the days after his civil deposition.

10. President Clinton endeavored to obstruct justice during the grand jury investigation by refusing to testify for seven months and lying to senior White House aides with knowledge that they would relay the President's false statements to the grand jury – and did thereby deceive, obstruct, and impede the grand jury.

11. President Clinton abused his constitutional authority by (i) lying to the public and the Congress in January 1998 about his relationship with Ms. Lewinsky; (ii) promising at that time to cooperate fully with the grand jury investigation; (iii) later refusing six invitations to testify voluntarily to the grand jury; (iv) invoking Executive Privilege; (v) lying to the grand jury in August 1998; and (vi) lying again to the public and Congress on August 17, 1998 – all as part of an effort to hinder, impede, and deflect possible inquiry by the Congress of the United States.

== Response to report ==
At the time it was released, the report was criticized for making accusations about exactly what Clinton did. The report claimed "the details are crucial to an informed evaluation of the testimony, the credibility of witnesses, and the reliability of other evidence. Many of the details reveal highly personal information; many are sexually explicit. This is unfortunate, but it is essential." Because Starr's office allegedly leaked portions to press about sexual details that were mentioned in his report, he was criticized for using the scandal as a political maneuver and was charged for violating legal ethics by presenting information irrelevant to an investigation as evidence of legal wrongdoing. Also, it is unclear whether Starr had the legal authority to ask Clinton questions about his sexual relationship with Lewinsky, as the OIC was convened solely to investigate Whitewater and Paula Jones' claim that Clinton sexually harassed her. Questioning about a sexual relationship void of assault appears to be both irrelevant under the Federal Rules of Evidence (FRE) as a whole and under Rule 413, which allows questioning about separate allegations of sexual assault (which was never asserted about Lewinsky's relationship with Clinton).

The report was also criticized for exaggerating what the legal definition of perjury is, accusing Clinton of committing perjury after only one witness claimed he did so and saying that Clinton lied when he said he did not have sexual relations with Lewinsky in terms described by Paula Jones' attorneys. Two of the three parts of the definition of "sexual relations" described by Jones' attorneys during her lawsuit had been ruled out by presiding Judge Susan Webber Wright as "too broad" and legally unacceptable.

The report alleged that Clinton considered oral sex to be a form of sexual relations and that the relationship between him and Lewinsky lasted longer than the date he described, but presented nothing relevant to back its claims. The report also claimed that Clinton falsely denied under oath ever meeting with Lewinsky alone at times, despite the fact that Clinton did admit to this when he testified, and that Clinton obstructed justice by concealing gifts he gave to Lewinsky and destroying an intimate note that was left in a book he claimed Lewinsky gave him when she visited the White House on January 4, 1998. Lewinsky's testimony that Clinton concealed gifts was contradicted by both Clinton's testimony and that of his personal secretary Betty Currie, who each said that it was Lewinsky who asked him for some gifts and that he tended to give a number of his staff gifts as an act of courtesy. Betty Currie also produced some of the gifts Clinton gave to Lewinsky before the grand jury. Clinton also denied ever seeing such an intimate note and the Secret Service WAVES records showed Lewinsky did not visit the White House on any given date in 1998. Starr also presented nothing credible to back his claim that Clinton obstructed justice by asking Lewinsky to file an affidavit denying there was ever a relationship between the two or that both Lewinsky and Clinton denied what had truly happened during the relationship under oath. The report also alleged Clinton's job offer to Lewinsky was an attempt to keep her from admitting the relationship to the public and thus obstruct justice, but had nothing relevant to back this claim either.

Starr also accused Clinton of denying under oath that he ever had a conversation with Vernon Jordan about Lewinsky's involvement in the Paula Jones lawsuit. Clinton, however, was never asked this when he testified during the Jones case. Starr also accused Clinton of witness tampering by influencing Currie to testify in favor of him. Currie, however, was not called as a witness when stated what she saw had happened during the relationship between Clinton and Lewinsky and it was demonstrated that Lewinsky was a friend of Currie's who had exchanged some of the gifts Clinton gave Lewinsky during a visit. While Starr did acknowledge that Currie did visit Lewinsky's apartment and exchanged the gifts with her, he also claimed that the fact that Currie drove to Lewinsky's apartment proved Lewinsky's testimony that Clinton concealed the gifts was correct and Currie's and Clinton's were both false. This claim about was denounced as without any basis or logic.

Starr also claimed that Clinton simultaneously delayed testimony for seven months and lied to potential grand jury witnesses by publicly denying the relationship, and thus committed a criminal felony by refusing to testify. When Clinton made his claim about his relationship with Lewinsky to the public, however, he was not under oath and thus it legally was not a felony. There was also no evidence that Clinton committed witness tampering by privately denying the relationship to these witnesses and asking them to testify in his favor.

Starr also argued that Clinton abused power by: denying the relationship with Lewinsky ever occurred; using executive privilege to both pursue an appeal against the case without Starr's knowledge; using executive privilege to cover up the relationship; delaying his grand jury testimony until August, and by getting the Secret Service to agree to assist in covering up the relationship in an acquiescing matter. However, a letter was discovered that showed Clinton's legal team had informed Starr before the appeals took place. The report was also misleading when it reflected the Supreme Court's ruling that the President could not use the Secret Service to assist in whatever they wanted help with. Supreme Court Chief Justice William Rehnquist, who wrote the majority opinion, had also stated that any case with merit, the prospect of an appeal would be granted. When Clinton pursued the appeal before the DC District Court, the court's Chief Justice Norma Holloway Johnson acknowledged that Clinton was cooperating with Starr and did not use executive privilege to cover up the relationship. Abuse of power had also been defined in The Federalist Papers as "corrupt use of the office for personal gain or some other improper purpose," which was not demonstrated in this case.

=== Partial retraction ===
In January 2020, while testifying as a defense lawyer for U.S. President Donald Trump during his Senate impeachment trial, Starr himself would retract some of the allegations he made in the report. Slate journalist Jeremy Stahl pointed out that as he was urging the Senate not to remove Trump as president, Starr contradicted various arguments he used in 1998 to justify Clinton's impeachment. In defending Trump, Starr also claimed he was wrong to have called for impeachment against Clinton for abuse of executive privilege and efforts to obstruct Congress and also stated that the House Judiciary Committee was right in 1998 to have rejected one of the planks for impeachment he had advocated for. He also invoked a 1999 Hofstra Law Review article by Yale law professor Akhil Amar, who argued that the Clinton impeachment proved just how impeachment and removal causes "grave disruption" to a national election.

== See also ==
- Clinton v. Jones, 1997 landmark Supreme Court case decision establishing that a sitting U.S. president has no immunity from civil litigation against them, for acts done before taking office and unrelated to the office.
- Impeachment investigations of United States federal officials
- Full Text of the Starr Report
