= Sarah Burgess (playwright) =

American playwright

Sarah Burgess is an American playwright and screenwriter whose works include Dry Powder, Kings, and the anthology true crime television series American Crime Story.

== Career ==
=== Theater ===
Burgess took part in Ars Nova's Play Group, where she wrote Dry Powder and presented it in a reading. Oskar Eustis, artistic director of The Public Theater in New York, discovered the play soon after. "For me it happens once a decade," Eustis explained. "'But I read her play and immediately said, 'We're producing this.'"

Dry Powder is a comedy-drama principally concerned with the world of private equity, viewed through the microcosm of a firm’s competing attempts to confront the fallout from a public relations crisis. Burgess was drawn to the topic after working as a tutor for students preparing to take graduate school admissions tests, many of whom worked at investment firms like Goldman Sachs. “I was fascinated by the culture of the place," she said in an interview with The Washington Post, explaining that the juxtaposition of moral responsibility with bankers' complex, abstract business transactions seemed fertile ground for a satirical production. She continued her research by reading such titles as Barbarians at the Gate, a book focused on the 1988 leveraged buyout and subsequent collapse of RJR Nabisco.

Dry Powder premiered at New York's Public Theater, starring John Krasinski, Claire Danes, Hank Azaria, and Sanjit De Silva. Marilyn Stasio of Variety called it “frighteningly funny” and Danes’ performance a "stunning portrait." Charles Isherwood of The New York Times said that Burgess’ "grasp of the jargon of high finance is impressive," but complained that the play "takes a long time to move beyond mildly entertaining verbal fisticuffs . . . These people may live their jobs, but watching them do so does not have infinite appeal . . ." The London Times called the play "a whip-smart workplace drama” and “a relentless look at how capitalism works at the sharp end," while Wei Huan-Chen of The Houston Chronicle praised the “slick satire”, and opened his review with the question, “When was the last time a play was so intensely quotable?"

Burgess’ 2018 production, Kings, chronicles two jaded Washington lobbyists attempting to maneuver an idealistic new representative from Texas. “I find myself writing about money and the system that it creates in professional lives, and how that really can sort of divide us,” said Burgess. “I like to find a comedy in that . . . There’s something in that that just naturally compels me . . .”

Burgess is from Alexandria, Virginia, and identifies the city's proximity to Washington, D.C., as a factor in her decision to write Kings. Speaking of her works as a whole, she remarked, “The voice of people who are unapologetic about their belief in the free market and survival of the fittest has always interested me.”

=== Television ===
In 2019, Burgess’ work expanded from stage to television.

FX announced that the third season of its Emmy Award-winning anthology series American Crime Story would explore the sex scandal surrounding U.S. President Bill Clinton and White House intern Monica Lewinsky, with Burgess as the head writer, showrunner, and executive producer. FX CEO John Landgraf said the show would highlight "the overlooked dimensions of the women who found themselves caught up in the scandal and political war that cast a long shadow over the Clinton Presidency." The third season starred Beanie Feldstein as Lewinsky, Clive Owen as Clinton, Sarah Paulson as Linda Tripp, and Annaleigh Ashford as Paula Jones, which premiered on September 7, 2021.

== Awards and recognition ==
Year	Award	Title	Category	Result	Ref
2018	Laurence Olivier Award	Dry Powder	Best Entertainment or Comedy Play	Nominated	
2022	Primetime Emmy Awards	Impeachment: American Crime Story	Outstanding Writing for a Limited or Anthology Series or Movie	Nominated	
