= Impeachment: American Crime Story =

Season 3 of "American Crime Story"

- Promotional poster
- Starring: Sarah Paulson; Beanie Feldstein; Annaleigh Ashford; Margo Martindale; Edie Falco; Clive Owen
- No. of episodes: 10

Release
- Original network: FX
- Original release: September 7 – November 9, 2021

Season chronology
- ← Previous; The Assassination of Gianni Versace

Impeachment: American Crime Story is the third season of the FX true crime anthology television series American Crime Story. It consists of 10 episodes and premiered on September 7, 2021. The season portrays the Clinton–Lewinsky scandal, subsequent impeachment of Clinton and is based on the book A Vast Conspiracy: The Real Story of the Sex Scandal That Nearly Brought Down a President by Jeffrey Toobin.

The cast includes Sarah Paulson, Annaleigh Ashford, and Judith Light (all returning from previous seasons), along with Beanie Feldstein, Clive Owen, Margo Martindale, Billy Eichner, Cobie Smulders, Edie Falco, Taran Killam, Colin Hanks, and Elizabeth Reaser. The season received generally favorable reviews from critics.

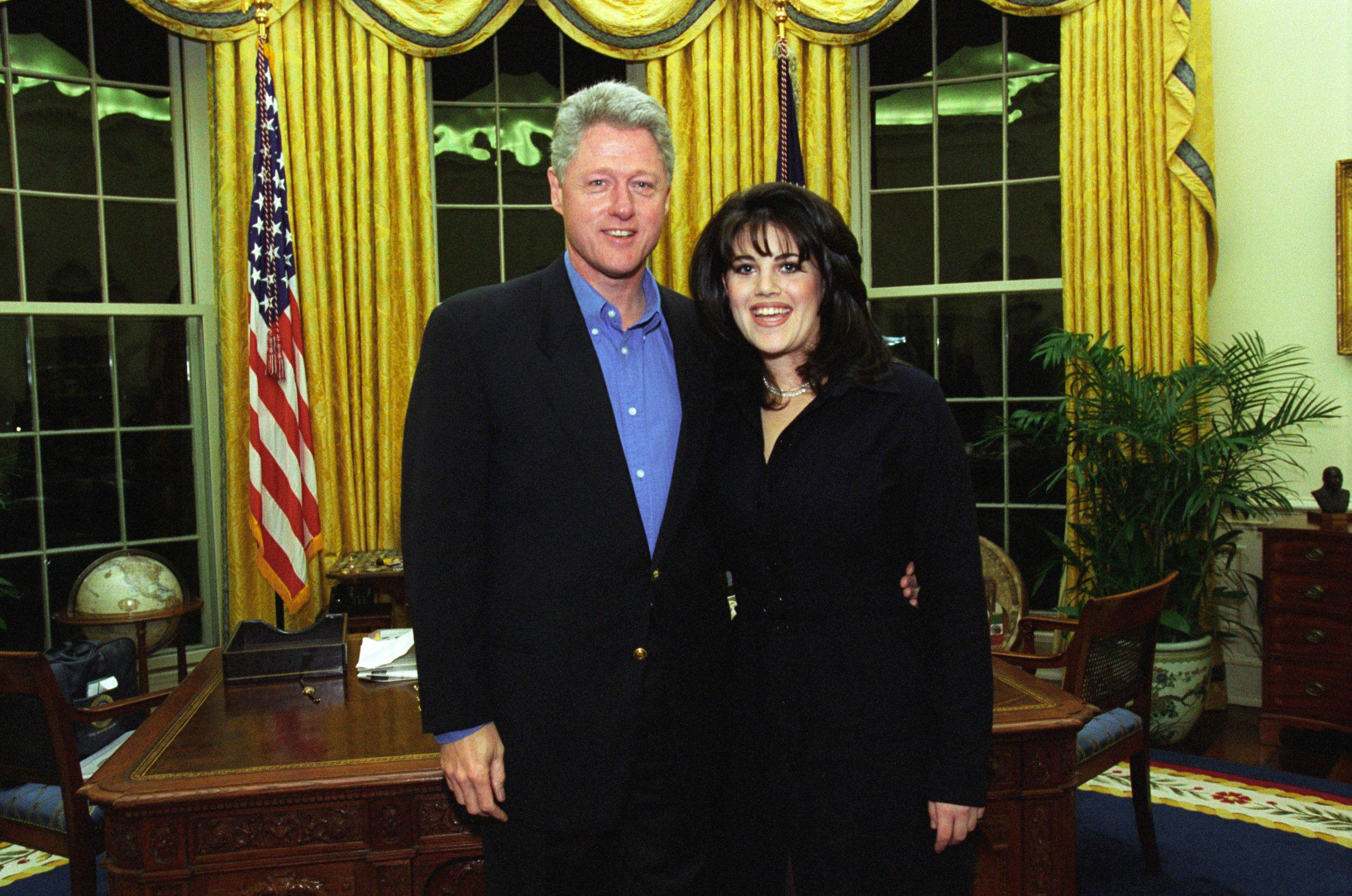
President Clinton and Monica Lewinsky in the Oval Office, 1997

== Cast ==
=== Main ===
- Sarah Paulson as Linda Tripp
- Beanie Feldstein as Monica Lewinsky
- Annaleigh Ashford as Paula Jones
- Margo Martindale as Lucianne Goldberg
- Edie Falco as Hillary Clinton
- Clive Owen as President Bill Clinton

=== Recurring ===
- Colin Hanks as Mike Emmick
- Cobie Smulders as Ann Coulter
- Taran Killam as Steve Jones
- Mira Sorvino as Marcia Lewis
- Rae Dawn Chong as Betty Currie
- Danny Jacobs as Michael Isikoff
- George Salazar as George Conway
- Judith Light as Susan Carpenter-McMillan
- Billy Eichner as Matt Drudge
- Christopher McDonald as Robert S. Bennett
- Jim Rash as Kenneth Bacon
- Blair Underwood as Vernon Jordan
- Teddy Sears as James A. Fisher
- Darren Goldstein as Jackie Bennett
- Dan Bakkedahl as Kenneth Starr
- Morgan Peter Brown as Paul Rosenzweig
- Ashlie Atkinson as Juanita Broaddrick
- Lindsey Broad as Karin Immergut
- Alan Starzinski as Brett Kavanaugh
- Fred Melamed as William H. Ginsburg
- Rob Brownstein as Bernard Lewinsky
- Scott Michael Morgan as Mike McCurry
- Patrick Fischler as Sidney Blumenthal
- Joseph Mazzello as Paul Begala

=== Guest ===
- Elizabeth Reaser as Kathleen Willey
- Kevin Pollak as Bernard Nussbaum
- George H. Xanthis as George Stephanopoulos
- Sarah Catherine Hook as Catherine Allday Davis
- Kim Matula as Laura Ingraham
- Rebecca Lowman as Marsha Scott
- Chris Riggi as Jake Tapper
- Jeannetta Arnette as Delmer Lee Corbin
- T. J. Thyne as Kirby Behre
- Tim Martin Gleason as Mitchell Ettinger
- Kara Luiz as Beverly Lambert
- Stewart Skelton as Jim Lehrer
- Brent Sexton as Dick Morris
- Christopher May as Steve Kroft
- Peter Oldring as David E. Kendall
- Diahnna Nicole Baxter as Ann Jordan
- Christopher Redman as Anthony Zaccagnini
- Amy Pietz as Lisa Myers
- Matthew Floyd Miller as Vince Foster
- Jason Cook as Matt Lauer
- Dan Pfau as Collins, based on journalist Nancy Collins

== Episodes ==
| No. overall | No. in season | Title | Directed by | Written by | Original release date | Prod. code | US viewers (millions) |
|---|---|---|---|---|---|---|---|
| 20 | 1 | "Exiles" | Ryan Murphy | Sarah Burgess | September 7, 2021 | 4WAX01 | 0.92 |
In January 1998, Monica Lewinsky receives an invitation to meet with Linda Tripp. The meeting turns out to be a trap organized by the FBI, who escort Lewinsky to a hotel suite to be interviewed by the Office of Special Counsel. Five years earlier, Tripp is relocated to the Pentagon following the suicide of deputy White House counsel Vince Foster, whose life and death becomes the focus of a potential tell-all Tripp wants to write. Paula Jones pursues litigation against President Bill Clinton, demanding he apologize for unwanted advances he made to her when he was Governor of Arkansas, and files a sexual harassment lawsuit against him. In 1996, Tripp meets Lewinsky, who has been recently transferred from the White House to the Pentagon, and discovers she is involved with someone in the White House, but unaware that it is Clinton.
| 21 | 2 | "The President Kissed Me" | Michael Uppendahl | Sarah Burgess | September 14, 2021 | 4WAX02 | 0.69 |
In November 1995, while working as a White House intern, Lewinsky learns that both she and her colleagues will take on greater responsibilities in light of the recent government shutdown. She begins her trysts with Clinton, which turn sexual after she confesses her love for him. In 1996, Lewinsky begins confiding in Tripp, revealing that her "boyfriend" has not been in contact with her. Following Clinton's successful re-election, Lewinsky reveals the truth of her affair with Clinton and his promise to bring her back to the White House upon his re-election. Jones' lawsuit attracts conservative feminist Susan Carpenter-McMillan, who promises to assist her. In 1997, Tripp meets with Newsweek journalist Michael Isikoff, who hopes she can corroborate the allegations made by former volunteer aide Kathleen Willey, and hints to him that there is a bigger story.
| 22 | 3 | "Not to Be Believed" | Michael Uppendahl | Sarah Burgess | September 21, 2021 | 4WAX03 | 0.66 |
Tripp continues speaking with Isikoff, and ultimately tells him about Lewinsky's affair with the president. Jones is offered a financial settlement. Clinton and Lewinsky's relationship ends.
| 23 | 4 | "The Telephone Hour" | Laure de Clermont-Tonnerre | Flora Birnbaum | September 28, 2021 | 4WAX04 | 0.61 |
In August 1997, Lewinsky begins to frequent the White House for job offers in the West Wing but hears of no opportunities, devastating her and becomes frustrated with both Clinton and Betty Currie, his assistant. Her friendship with Tripp also begins to deteriorate as well especially when she begins to consistently call Tripp to discuss Bill; eventually Tripp confides in Lucianne Goldberg about the affair and Monica but Lucianne suggests she tapes the calls with Lewinsky for evidence of the affair. Tripp struggles in her friendship to Lewinsky but as Lewinsky begins to further frequent the White House and even screams at Betty, she begins taping each call with Lewinsky to end this for Lewinsky's mental health. Eventually, Lewinsky visits Vernon Jordan, who arranges a job for her in New York City. During a sleepover with Tripp, she reveals a blue dress to her, apparently stained with Clinton's semen. Tripp decides to bring the evidence to Paula Jones's lawyers; she is subpoenaed in return. Bill discovers that Lewinsky is also on the witness list, forcing him to inform Hillary.
| 24 | 5 | "Do You Hear What I Hear?" | Laure de Clermont-Tonnerre | Halley Feiffer | October 5, 2021 | 4WAX05 | 0.54 |
In December 1997, Lewinsky prepares to relocate to New York. After hearing that Lewinsky intends to wear the stained blue dress for the interview, Tripp convinces her not to clean it, as an insurance policy should the truth come out. However, during a late night call with Clinton, Lewinsky hears that she is on the witness list for Paula's lawsuit. Clinton encourages her to seek legal counsel and draft an affidavit, which she does, falsely denying a relationship with Clinton. After discovering Tripp was subpoenaed, their friendship crumbles when Lewinsky persuades her to commit perjury. Fearing the consequences, Tripp turns over the tapes to her lawyer who reveals that she could be sentenced for taping Lewinsky without consent, since it is a felony in Maryland. Lucianne soon reveals the knowledge of the tapes to Ken Starr and his prosecution team, who organize with Tripp to wear a wire. She meets with Lewinsky, who suspects Tripp of recording the conversation when she begins acting strange, even checking her bag. Starr's team obtains a confession from Lewinsky, after she discusses Vernon Jordan's role in getting her New York job and committing perjury in her affidavit.
| 25 | 6 | "Man Handled" | Ryan Murphy | Sarah Burgess | October 12, 2021 | 4WAX06 | 0.55 |
Returning to the opening scene back in January 1998, Lewinsky is confronted by Tripp and FBI agents who escort her to a hotel suite to be interviewed by prosecutors and members of Starr's staff. There, she discovers that she faces a total of 28 years imprisonment for committing perjury-related offenses including filing a false affidavit; however, she refuses to cooperate with the investigation when she discovers that in doing so, she would have to disclose the affair and tape calls with Clinton, Betty, and Vernon Jordan. Furthermore, Lewinsky is horrified when she discovers Tripp's deception and betrayal in taping their discussions and demands to call her lawyer and mother, which she is discouraged from doing so, as Clinton is planned to testify the following morning. Lewinsky hears that her mother may also be prosecuted as well; her mother soon decides to leave New York for Washington to be with Monica. Lewinsky's father hires Bill Ginsburg, a family lawyer to represent her. As Monica's mother arrives late at night and on advice from Ginsburg, she is told to leave the room, which she does, with her mother after the team is unable to write up that Monica will receive full immunity for her testimony.
| 26 | 7 | "The Assassination of Monica Lewinsky" | Michael Uppendahl | Sarah Burgess & Flora Birnbaum & Daniel Pearle | October 19, 2021 | 4WAX07 | 0.61 |
The morning after Lewinsky's confrontation with the FBI, Clinton is brought to testify where he denies sexually assaulting Paula and Kathleen Willey, as well as his relationship with Lewinsky. Soon afterwards, he discloses the news of the affair to Hillary but denies his involvement with Lewinsky. The story of the affair breaks on nationwide television and both Lewinsky and Tripp are subjected to media scrutiny — Lewinsky for being a stalker obsessed with Clinton and Tripp as a villain for her role in taping Lewinsky's conversations. Lewinsky and her mother are held up in the Watergate, as media descends on the building, while Lewinsky and Ginsburg both sign an agreement with Starr's team for immunity in exchange for her testimony. Upon discovering that Ginsburg is appearing on news outlets to deflect Lewinsky's role in the affair, Starr refuses to sign the deal to grant her immunity. Lewinsky is heartbroken when Clinton denies the relationship during a press conference with Hillary, referring to Lewinsky as "that woman".
| 27 | 8 | "Stand by Your Man" | Rachel Morrison | Flora Birnbaum | October 26, 2021 | 4WAX08 | 0.62 |
In 1992, Gennifer Flowers publicly claims she had a 12-year relationship with Clinton. Clinton and Hillary appear on 60 Minutes to dispute the claims; Clinton's popularity increases, while Hillary's demeanor is heavily criticized. In January 1998, while talking about the Lewinsky scandal on The Today Show, Hillary says a "vast right-wing conspiracy" is attempting to sabotage her husband's presidency. Starr plans to indict Monica unless she cooperates; Ginsburg is fired, and Monica makes a deal to testify in exchange for immunity. In August, following the embassy bombings, Clinton orders a retaliatory strike against Al-Qaeda. He later discovers Starr intends to subpoena him and admits to Hillary that he lied about the extent of his affair with Lewinsky. Clinton gives a taped deposition, where he admits to an "improper physical relationship", before admitting the truth in a televised address to the nation. The Clintons leave Washington to celebrate Bill's birthday on Martha's Vineyard, but Hillary refuses to speak to him, eventually excoriating him for forcing her to defend him publicly. Returning to Washington, Bill learns that the strikes failed.
| 28 | 9 | "The Grand Jury" | Rachel Morrison | Sarah Burgess | November 2, 2021 | 4WAX09 | 0.59 |
Lewinsky testifies before the grand jury where she is consistently shamed for her relationship with the President and undergoes tough questioning especially about her intention to arrive in Washington to start an affair with a married man. She soon asks Emmick to leave the room when asked about the events of January 1998 when she was held by the agents. When she recounts that day tearfully, she convinces the grand jury to guilt her and concludes her testimony with "I hate Linda Tripp". Meanwhile, due to the negative press attention, Tripp hides out in a hotel and when she appears before the grand jury, she is attacked for her disloyalty to Lewinsky in taping her conversations, especially when she implies that the Clintons may have been behind Vince Foster's death and that she was threatened into taping Lewinsky. Jones gets a nose job and she later finds out her case has been dropped. She gets in a fight with Steve, and breaks up with him after he implies that she went up to Clinton's room to have sex with him. Starr successfully obtains a tape of Lewinsky admitting the President aroused her and charges Clinton for perjury and obstruction of justice.
| 29 | 10 | "The Wilderness" | Michael Uppendahl | Sarah Burgess | November 9, 2021 | 4WAX10 | 0.54 |
In September 1998, the Starr Report is released, with the Internet crashing and the media consistently commenting on Clinton and Lewinsky's relationship. Two months later, while attempting to file a lawsuit against the Pentagon, Tripp learns she will be indicted in Maryland for the tapes, since she does not have state immunity. Lewinsky grows horrified after learning the tapes are being released. Jones, desperate to pay her mounting legal bills, accepts an offer to pose for Penthouse, angering her conservative audience. The House of Representatives votes to impeach Clinton while rumors of Juanita Broaddrick's rape allegations swirl, but the Senate acquits him. NBC sits on the interview in which Broaddrick makes the allegations public and by the time it airs the nation has lost interest. Lewinsky's biography about the affair is published and met with an extremely favorable response.

== Production ==
=== Development ===
In January 2017, it was announced that a fourth season of American Crime Story was in development, set to air after Katrina, which was eventually dropped. It was to cover the Clinton–Lewinsky scandal and the ensuing events during Clinton's presidency, based on Jeffrey Toobin's book A Vast Conspiracy: The Real Story of the Sex Scandal That Nearly Brought Down a President. However, in April 2018, creator Ryan Murphy revealed that the season was scrapped and no longer in development.

On August 6, 2019, it was announced that the Clinton–Lewinsky scandal season was back in development as the third season of the series, which would be written by Sarah Burgess and titled Impeachment. The season began production in October 2020.

=== Casting ===
In February 2017, Murphy revealed that Sarah Paulson was to star in the season, but not as Hillary Clinton. It was later revealed that Paulson, Beanie Feldstein, and Annaleigh Ashford would star as Linda Tripp, Monica Lewinsky, and Paula Jones, respectively, with Lewinsky herself signing on as a co-producer. Later that month, it was announced that the character of Hillary Clinton would not be significant in the series.

On November 15, 2019, it was reported that Clive Owen would play Bill Clinton and Anthony Green, Al Gore. Later that month, it was announced that Margo Martindale would portray Lucianne Goldberg. In January 2020, it was announced that Billy Eichner had signed on to play Matt Drudge.

In March 2021, it was announced that Edie Falco and Betty Gilpin would portray Hillary Clinton and Ann Coulter, respectively; Gilpin later exited the series due to scheduling conflicts, and was replaced by Cobie Smulders. It was also announced that Judith Light would play Susan Carpenter-McMillan.

In August 2021, it was announced that Mira Sorvino, Blair Underwood, Joseph Mazzello, Dan Bakkedahl, Kevin Pollak, and Patrick Fischler had joined the cast in recurring roles.

=== Filming ===
Principal photography was set to begin on March 21, 2020 but was halted due to the COVID-19 pandemic. On November 13, 2020, Sarah Paulson posted an image of herself as Linda Tripp with the caption, "Linda. American Crime Story: Impeachment has begun principal photography." Filming concluded in August 2021.

== Release ==
The official teaser for the series was released on August 4, 2021. The series was set to have been released on September 27, 2020, but this was delayed due to the pandemic. The first episode was released on September 7, 2021.

Due to a 2016 agreement between 20th Century Fox Television (now 20th Television) and Netflix, which predates the acquisition of FX and 20th Television by Disney, Netflix once held exclusive global SVOD streaming rights to the American Crime Story franchise (except in Canada), with Impeachment initially expected to arrive on that service in 2022. This did not turn out to be case as in 2022, both seasons of the series departed Netflix along with other major Disney owned shows available on Netflix like Daredevil and Jessica Jones. This implies that the agreement has expired. As such, unlike most other FX shows, which are available on the FX on Hulu hub in the U.S., Impeachment was not made available on a next-day basis to subscribers to Hulu's base service, but was available on-demand (and on the FXNow TV Everywhere platform) to subscribers to the FX channel, including those subscribed via Hulu + Live TV. However, on March 3, 2022, Hulu has announced that starting March 7 all 3 seasons of American Crime Story including Impeachment, as well as Ryan Murphy's two other FX shows American Horror Story (including its spinoff American Horror Stories) and Pose will be available for streaming on Hulu, with future seasons becoming available for next day streaming on the FX on Hulu platform.

The season first broadcast in the United Kingdom in weekly episodes on BBC Two, starting on October 19, 2021.

Impeachment: American Crime Story was later made available on Disney+ internationally via its Star hub beginning in 2023 in selected territories.

== Reception ==
=== Critical response ===
The review aggregator Rotten Tomatoes gave the season an approval rating of 69% based on 71 reviews, with an average rating of 6.8/10. The site's critical consensus reads, "Impeachment can't seem to decide whether it's unearthing the humanity of a presidential scandal or indulging the mythology of its media circus, but Beanie Feldstein and Sarah Paulson's performances ring true in the midst of all the noise." On Metacritic, the season has a score of 61 out of 100, based on 33 critics, indicating "generally favorable" reviews.

James Jackson of The Times gave the season four out of five stars, deeming it "a gleefully watchable bonkbuster" and praising the performances of the cast.

Lucy Mangan of The Guardian also gave it four out of five stars, saying that it was "a weaker instalment than The People v OJ Simpson", but added: "it holds up well in terms of propulsive, addictive drama. It's a rich, soapy lather shot through with comedy and an irresistible wholeheartedness." Susannah Butter of the Evening Standard also gave it four out of five stars, writing: "As a piece of storytelling it is compelling -- and all credit to Lewinsky for having the courage to come forward and tell her version of events."

Benjamin Lee, also writing for The Guardian, gave it three out of five stars. He wrote: "There's at times a little bit too much for the show to take on, especially one that tends to repeat itself, and it works best when the focus remains tight on Tripp, whose bizarre travails grip even when the show around her slips."

Fiona Sturges of the Financial Times also gave it three out of five stars, writing: "The narrative is expertly paced and has a soapy quality which, though distracting at first, becomes increasingly moreish as the series progresses."

Kelly Lawler of USA Today gave it two and a half out of four stars, writing: "there are many moments of brilliance, but they are simply not strung together with much finesse. Impeachment ends up as a glossy, well-acted series without much to say."

James Poniewozik of The New York Times was more critical, writing: "Despite several striking performances, its perspective and ideas break out only occasionally from underneath the pancaked strata of details."

Melanie McFarland of Salon.com wrote: "At times you may question whether the other actors realize they're in the same show as Feldstein or whether that show is a drama or a dark comedy."

Alan Sepinwall of Rolling Stone gave it two out of five stars, writing: "With the exception of Beanie Feldstein's wonderful, deeply sympathetic portrayal of Lewinsky, Impeachment is unfortunately everything one might have feared about The People v. O.J. before it debuted."

=== Accolades ===
| Year | Award | Category | Recipient | Result | Ref. |
|---|---|---|---|---|---|
| 2022 | Golden Globe Awards | Best Miniseries or Television Film | Impeachment: American Crime Story | Nominated | |
| 2022 | Hollywood Critics Association TV Awards | Best Broadcast Network or Cable Limited or Anthology Series | Impeachment: American Crime Story | Nominated | |
| 2022 | Hollywood Critics Association TV Awards | Best Actress in a Broadcast Network or Cable Limited or Anthology Series | Sarah Paulson | Won | |
| 2022 | Hollywood Critics Association TV Awards | Best Directing in a Broadcast Network or Cable Limited or Anthology Series | Ryan Murphy (for "Man Handled") | Nominated | |
| 2022 | Hollywood Critics Association TV Awards | Best Writing in a Broadcast Network or Cable Limited or Anthology Series | Sarah Burgess (for "Man Handled") | Nominated | |
| 2022 | Make-Up Artists and Hair Stylists Guild Awards | Best Period and/or Character Hair Styling | Natalie Driscoll and Michelle Ceglia | Nominated | |
| 2022 | Make-Up Artists and Hair Stylists Guild Awards | Best Period and/or Character Make-Up | Robin Beauchesne, KarrieAnne Heisner Sillay, Angela Moos, and Erin LaBre | Nominated | |
| 2022 | Make-Up Artists and Hair Stylists Guild Awards | Best Special Make-Up Effects | Justin Raleigh, Kelly Golden, Chris Hampton, and Thom Floutz | Nominated | |
| 2022 | Primetime Emmy Awards | Outstanding Lead Actress in a Limited or Anthology Series or Movie | Sarah Paulson | Nominated | |
| 2022 | Primetime Emmy Awards | Outstanding Writing for a Limited or Anthology Series or Movie | Sarah Burgess (for "Man Handled") | Nominated | |
| 2022 | Primetime Creative Arts Emmy Awards | Outstanding Contemporary Hairstyling | Natalie Driscoll, Nanxy Tong-Heater, Michelle Ceglia, Suzy Mazzarese, Lauren Kress, and Leighann Pitchon (for "The Assassination of Monica Lewinsky") | Won | |
| 2022 | Primetime Creative Arts Emmy Awards | Outstanding Contemporary Makeup (Non-Prosthetic) | Robin Beauchesne, KarriAnn Sillay, Angela Moos, Erin LeBre, and Kerrin Jackson (for "The Assassination of Monica Lewinsky") | Nominated | |
| 2022 | Primetime Creative Arts Emmy Awards | Outstanding Prosthetic Makeup | Justin Raleigh, Greg Cannom, Thomas Floutz, Chris Hampton, and Kelly Golden (for "The Wilderness") | Nominated | |
| 2022 | ReFrame Stamp | IMDbPro Top 200 Scripted TV Recipients | Impeachment: American Crime Story | Won | |
| 2022 | Satellite Awards | Best Actress in a Drama/Genre Series | Beanie Feldstein | Nominated | |
| 2022 | Satellite Awards | Best Actor in a Miniseries, Limited Series, or Motion Picture Made for Television | Clive Owen | Nominated | |
| 2022 | Satellite Awards | Best Actress in a Supporting Role in a Miniseries, Limited Series, or Motion Picture Made for Television | Sarah Paulson | Nominated | |
| 2022 | Writers Guild of America Awards | Long Form – Adapted | Flora Birnbaum, Sarah Burgess, Halley Feiffer and Daniel Pearle | Nominated | |

=== Response from involved parties ===
Allison Tripp, the daughter of Linda Tripp, reacted positively to the show's empathetic depiction of her mother and Sarah Paulson's performance. According to Paulson, she never had a chance to consult Tripp on the project prior to her death in 2020, a year before the show's release.

Bill and Hillary Clinton, according to executive producer Dana Walden, have not officially commented on the show, though the producers made sure to repeatedly vet the writing.

Paula Jones heavily criticized her portrayal in the series.
