= American Crime Story =

American crime drama anthology television series

- Genre: Biographical; Crime drama; Anthology
- Based on: The Run of His Life: The People v. O. J. Simpson by Jeffrey Toobin (s. 1); Vulgar Favors: Andrew Cunanan, Gianni Versace, and the Largest Failed Manhunt in U.S. History by Maureen Orth (s. 2); A Vast Conspiracy: The Real Story of the Sex Scandal That Nearly Brought Down a President by Jeffrey Toobin (s. 3)
- Developed by: Scott Alexander and Larry Karaszewski (s. 1); Tom Rob Smith (s. 2); Sarah Burgess (s. 3)
- Starring: See List of American Crime Story cast members
- Composer: Mac Quayle
- Country of origin: United States
- Original language: English
- No. of seasons: 3
- No. of episodes: 29

Production
- Executive producers: Larry Karaszewski; Scott Alexander; Brad Falchuk; Brad Simpson; Nina Jacobson; Dante Di Loreto; Ryan Murphy; Alexis Martin Woodall; Tom Rob Smith; Daniel Minahan; Sarah Paulson; Sarah Burgess
- Producers: Chip Vucelich; John Travolta (s.1); Alexis Martin Woodall (s.1); Eric Kovtun; Lou Eyrich; Eryn Krueger Mekash; Beanie Feldstein (s. 3); Monica Lewinsky (s. 3)
- Production locations: Los Angeles, California (Season 1, 3); Miami, Florida (Season 2)
- Cinematography: Nelson Cragg
- Editors: Adam Penn; C. Chi-Yoon Chung; Stewart Schill
- Running time: 42–74 minutes
- Production companies: Scott & Larry Productions (season 1); Color Force; Ryan Murphy Television (Note: Known as Ryan Murphy Productions for the first season.); FXP; 20th Television (Note: Credited as Fox 21 Television Studios for the first 2 seasons.)

Original release
- Network: FX
- Release: February 2, 2016 – November 9, 2021

Related
- American Story

American Crime Story is an American biographical crime drama anthology television series developed by Scott Alexander and Larry Karaszewski, who are also executive producers, alongside Brad Falchuk, Nina Jacobson, Ryan Murphy, and Brad Simpson. The series is the second installment in the American Story media franchise, following American Horror Story. Each season is presented as a self-contained miniseries and is independent of the events in other seasons. Alexander and Karaszewski did not return after the first season, but retain executive-producer credits. In the United States, the series is broadcast on FX. In January 2023, the series was renewed for a fourth season.

The first season, subtitled The People v. O. J. Simpson, chronicled the murder trial of O. J. Simpson, and was based on the book The Run of His Life: The People v. O. J. Simpson by Jeffrey Toobin. It premiered on February 2, 2016. The second season, subtitled The Assassination of Gianni Versace, chronicled the murder of designer Gianni Versace by spree-killer Andrew Cunanan, and was based on the book Vulgar Favors by Maureen Orth. It premiered on January 17, 2018, and concluded on March 21, 2018. The third season, subtitled Impeachment, chronicles the Clinton–Lewinsky scandal, and is based on the book A Vast Conspiracy: The Real Story of the Sex Scandal That Nearly Brought Down a President, also by Toobin. It premiered on September 7, 2021.

By August 2021, a potential fourth season, tentatively titled Studio 54, which would focus on the rise and fall of Studio 54 owners Steve Rubell and Ian Schrager, was in development; however, in September 2024, executive producer Brad Simpson stated there are no developments in the production of the season.

== Seasons ==
=== The People v. O. J. Simpson (2016) ===
Based on Jeffrey Toobin's The Run of His Life: The People v. O. J. Simpson, the season explores O. J. Simpson's (Cuba Gooding Jr.) murder trial as well as the combination of prosecution confidence, defense wiliness, and the Los Angeles Police Department's history with the city's African-American community that gave a jury what it needed: reasonable doubt.

The season also stars Sterling K. Brown as Christopher Darden, Kenneth Choi as Lance Ito, Christian Clemenson as Bill Hodgman, Bruce Greenwood as Gil Garcetti, Nathan Lane as F. Lee Bailey, Sarah Paulson as Marcia Clark, David Schwimmer as Robert Kardashian, John Travolta as Robert Shapiro, and Courtney B. Vance as Johnnie Cochran.

=== The Assassination of Gianni Versace (2018) ===
Based on Maureen Orth's Vulgar Favors: Andrew Cunanan, Gianni Versace, and the Largest Failed Manhunt in U.S. History, the season examines the July 1997 assassination of legendary fashion designer Gianni Versace (Édgar Ramírez) by sociopathic spree killer Andrew Cunanan (Darren Criss).

The season also stars Ricky Martin as Antonio D'Amico and Penélope Cruz as Donatella Versace.

=== Impeachment (2021) ===
The Clinton–Lewinsky scandal served as the basis for the third season of the series, Impeachment, following the ensuing events during Clinton's presidency, based on Jeffrey Toobin's book A Vast Conspiracy: The Real Story of the Sex Scandal That Nearly Brought Down a President.

The season stars Sarah Paulson as Linda Tripp, Beanie Feldstein as Monica Lewinsky, Clive Owen as Bill Clinton, Margo Martindale as Lucianne Goldberg, Edie Falco as Hillary Clinton, and Annaleigh Ashford as Paula Jones. Originally slated to premiere in September 2020, the network pushed back the air date due to Murphy's schedule and later due to the ongoing COVID-19 pandemic. The network previously considered pushing back the air date due to the 2020 election. The season premiered on September 7, 2021.

== Episodes ==
Season	Title	Episodes	Originally released	
Season	Title	Episodes	First released	Last released
1	The People v. O. J. Simpson	10	February 2, 2016	April 5, 2016
2	The Assassination of Gianni Versace	9	January 17, 2018	March 21, 2018
3	Impeachment	10	September 7, 2021	November 9, 2021

=== Season 1: The People v. O. J. Simpson (2016) ===
No. overall	No. in season	Title	Directed by	Written by	Original release date	Prod. code	US viewers (millions)
1	1	"From the Ashes of Tragedy"	Ryan Murphy	Scott Alexander & Larry Karaszewski	February 2, 2016	1WAX01	5.12
2	2	"The Run of His Life"	Ryan Murphy	Scott Alexander & Larry Karaszewski	February 9, 2016	1WAX02	3.90
3	3	"The Dream Team"	Anthony Hemingway	Daniel Vincent DeVincentis	February 16, 2016	1WAX03	3.34
4	4	"100% Not Guilty"	Anthony Hemingway	Maya Forbes & Wallace Wolodarsky and Scott Alexander & Larry Karaszewski	February 23, 2016	1WAX04	3.00
5	5	"The Race Card"	John Singleton	Joe Robert Cole	March 1, 2016	1WAX05	2.73
6	6	"Marcia, Marcia, Marcia"	Ryan Murphy	Daniel Vincent DeVincentis	March 8, 2016	1WAX06	3.00
7	7	"Conspiracy Theories"	Anthony Hemingway	Daniel Vincent DeVincentis	March 15, 2016	1WAX07	2.89
8	8	"A Jury in Jail"	Anthony Hemingway	Joe Robert Cole	March 22, 2016	1WAX08	2.91
9	9	"Manna from Heaven"	Anthony Hemingway	Scott Alexander & Larry Karaszewski	March 29, 2016	1WAX09	2.76
10	10	"The Verdict"	Ryan Murphy	Scott Alexander & Larry Karaszewski	April 5, 2016	1WAX10	3.27

=== Season 2: The Assassination of Gianni Versace (2018) ===
No. overall	No. in season	Title	Directed by	Written by	Original release date	Prod. code	US viewers (millions)
11	1	"The Man Who Would Be Vogue"	Ryan Murphy	Tom Rob Smith	January 17, 2018 (Note: This episode was available five days before the official premiere for FX+ subscribers.)	3WAX01	2.22
12	2	"Manhunt"	Nelson Cragg	Tom Rob Smith	January 24, 2018	3WAX02	1.42
13	3	"A Random Killing"	Gwyneth Horder-Payton	Tom Rob Smith	January 31, 2018	3WAX03	1.26
14	4	"House by the Lake"	Daniel Minahan	Tom Rob Smith	February 7, 2018	3WAX04	0.98
15	5	"Don't Ask Don't Tell"	Daniel Minahan	Tom Rob Smith	February 14, 2018	3WAX05	0.91
16	6	"Descent"	Gwyneth Horder-Payton	Tom Rob Smith	February 28, 2018	3WAX07	1.10
17	7	"Ascent"	Gwyneth Horder-Payton	Tom Rob Smith	March 7, 2018	3WAX06	0.92
18	8	"Creator / Destroyer"	Matt Bomer	Tom Rob Smith and Maggie Cohn	March 14, 2018	3WAX08	1.00
19	9	"Alone"	Daniel Minahan	Tom Rob Smith	March 21, 2018	3WAX09	1.20

=== Season 3: Impeachment (2021) ===
No. overall	No. in season	Title	Directed by	Written by	Original release date	Prod. code	US viewers (millions)
20	1	"Exiles"	Ryan Murphy	Sarah Burgess	September 7, 2021	4WAX01	0.92
21	2	"The President Kissed Me"	Michael Uppendahl	Sarah Burgess	September 14, 2021	4WAX02	0.69
22	3	"Not to Be Believed"	Michael Uppendahl	Sarah Burgess	September 21, 2021	4WAX03	0.66
23	4	"The Telephone Hour"	Laure de Clermont-Tonnerre	Flora Birnbaum	September 28, 2021	4WAX04	0.61
24	5	"Do You Hear What I Hear?"	Laure de Clermont-Tonnerre	Halley Feiffer	October 5, 2021	4WAX05	0.54
25	6	"Man Handled"	Ryan Murphy	Sarah Burgess	October 12, 2021	4WAX06	0.55
26	7	"The Assassination of Monica Lewinsky"	Michael Uppendahl	Sarah Burgess & Flora Birnbaum & Daniel Pearle	October 19, 2021	4WAX07	0.61
27	8	"Stand by Your Man"	Rachel Morrison	Flora Birnbaum	October 26, 2021	4WAX08	0.62
28	9	"The Grand Jury"	Rachel Morrison	Sarah Burgess	November 2, 2021	4WAX09	0.59
29	10	"The Wilderness"	Michael Uppendahl	Sarah Burgess	November 9, 2021	4WAX10	0.54

== Production ==
=== Development ===
==== The People v. O. J. Simpson ====
On October 7, 2014, it was announced that FX had ordered a ten-episode season of American Crime Story developed by Scott Alexander and Larry Karaszewski and executive produced by Alexander, Karaszewski, Ryan Murphy, and Brad Falchuk, the latter two of whom co-created such series as Nip/Tuck, Glee, American Horror Story, Scream Queens, and Pose. Murphy also directed the pilot episode. Other executive producers are Nina Jacobson and Brad Simpson. Co-executive producers are Anthony Hemingway and D. V. DeVincentis. All ten episodes were expected to be written by Alexander and Karaszewski. The series was previously in development at Fox, but later moved to the company's sibling cable network FX.

==== Proposed Katrina seasons ====
A season titled Katrina was announced to be the series' second season, initially said to be using Douglas Brinkley's book The Great Deluge: Hurricane Katrina, New Orleans, and the Mississippi Gulf Coast as the primary source material, with Annette Bening cast as Kathleen Blanco, Matthew Broderick as Michael D. Brown, and Dennis Quaid as George W. Bush. However, it was later announced that the source material had changed to Sheri Fink's book Five Days at Memorial: Life and Death in a Storm-Ravaged Hospital, and the season would take an unflinching look at the decisions doctors made at Memorial Medical Center. Sarah Paulson was due to star as Dr. Anna Pou, who was on duty at the hospital when Katrina struck. Cuba Gooding Jr. and Courtney B. Vance were set to return after their participation in the first season, but after the source material was changed, only Paulson was set to star, with the other actors such as Bening, Broderick, and Quaid leaving the project. However, it was said the producers would try to find new characters for at least some of those actors already cast.

The so-called Katrina season was originally planned to be the second season of the series, with The Assassination of Gianni Versace following as the third. However, in June 2017, it was announced that Katrina would not begin production until early 2018 and that Versace would air in early 2018, replacing Katrina as the show's second installment. In early February 2019, John Landgraf acknowledged that the Katrina storyline was cancelled and will not be the subject of any season of the series.

==== The Assassination of Gianni Versace ====
The Assassination of Gianni Versace: American Crime Story was picked up on October 18, 2016, and was announced as the third season of the series, following the season about Katrina. The announcement also revealed that English author Tom Rob Smith would be the writer of multiple episodes of the season, including the first two, while executive producer Ryan Murphy would be directing the season premiere. Following the airing of the first season's finale in April 2016, it was revealed that series creators Scott Alexander and Larry Karaszewski would not be returning for the second season. However, in June 2017, it was announced that Katrina would not begin production until early 2018 and that Versace would air in early 2018, replacing Katrina as the show's second installment.

==== Impeachment ====
In January 2017, it was announced that a fourth season was in development, to air after Katrina. It was to cover the Clinton–Lewinsky scandal and the ensuing events during Clinton's presidency, based on Jeffrey Toobin's book A Vast Conspiracy: The Real Story of the Sex Scandal That Nearly Brought Down a President. However, in April 2018, Murphy revealed that the season was scrapped and no longer in development.

On August 6, 2019, it was announced that the Clinton–Lewinsky scandal season was back in development as the third season of the series and that it would be titled Impeachment. The season began production in October 2020, despite the original release date slated as September 27, 2020. Lewinsky herself signed on as a co-producer. Later that month, it was announced that the character of Hillary Clinton would appear in the series, but that she would not have a significant role.

==== Studio 54 ====
On August 13, 2021, shortly before the premiere of Impeachment, it was announced that a potential fourth season, tentatively entitled Studio 54, was in development. This season would focus on the rise and fall of Steve Rubell and Ian Schrager and their Studio 54 nightclub during the 1970s leading up to Rubell and Schrager's eventual tax fraud conviction. In September 2024, executive producer Brad Simpson stated there are no developments in the production of the season.

=== Casting ===
For season 1, Cuba Gooding Jr. and Sarah Paulson were the first to be cast as Simpson and Marcia Clark, respectively. Subsequently, David Schwimmer was cast as Robert Kardashian. In January 2015, it was reported that John Travolta had joined the cast as Robert Shapiro; he would also serve as producer. In February 2015, Courtney B. Vance joined the series as Johnnie Cochran. In March 2015, it was announced that Connie Britton would co-star as Faye Resnick. April 2015 saw the casting of Sterling K. Brown as Christopher Darden, Jordana Brewster as Denise Brown, and Kenneth Choi as Judge Lance Ito. In May 2015, it was confirmed Selma Blair would be portraying Kris Kardashian Jenner. In July 2015, it was announced Nathan Lane had joined the cast as F. Lee Bailey.

In February 2017, Annette Bening joined the cast of the ultimately unproduced Katrina as Kathleen Blanco, while Matthew Broderick was cast as Michael D. Brown. That same month, Édgar Ramírez and Darren Criss joined the cast of The Assassination of Gianni Versace as Gianni Versace and Andrew Cunanan, respectively. Initial reports announced that Lady Gaga would portray Donatella Versace in The Assassination of Gianni Versace, but Murphy confirmed that they were false. Penélope Cruz was later cast in the role. In April 2017, it was announced that Ricky Martin had joined the cast of The Assassination of Gianni Versace as Antonio D'Amico, Versace's longtime partner. On April 28, 2017, Annaleigh Ashford was seen filming on the set of The Assassination of Gianni Versace with Criss. On June 21, 2017, it was announced that Ashford's role in the series would be as Elizabeth Cote, a friend of Cunanan's since high school. On May 5, 2017, Murphy posted a photo on Instagram of Criss and Max Greenfield on the set of the season. On June 21, 2017, it was announced that Finn Wittrock would play Jeffrey Trail, Cunanan's first victim.

In February 2017, Ryan Murphy revealed that Sarah Paulson was to star in Impeachment, but not as Hillary Clinton. In August 2019, it was revealed that Sarah Paulson, Beanie Feldstein, and Annaleigh Ashford would star as Linda Tripp, Monica Lewinsky, and Paula Jones, respectively. On November 15, 2019, it was reported that Oscar-nominated actor Clive Owen will be playing the role of Bill Clinton along with Anthony Green set to portray Al Gore. In January 2020, it was announced that Billy Eichner would play the role of journalist Matt Drudge and Betty Gilpin would portray conservative media pundit Ann Coulter. In March 2021, it was announced that Edie Falco would play Hillary Clinton. In June 2021, Colin Hanks joined the cast. In August 2021, it was announced that Gilpin had exited the season due to scheduling conflicts and would be replaced by Cobie Smulders.

=== Filming ===
Principal photography for the first season began on May 14, 2015, in Los Angeles, California. According to set photos, principal photography of Versace began at the beginning of May 2017, in Miami, Florida. Paulson revealed in an interview on Ellen that filming for season three is set to begin in Los Angeles, California. On November 13, 2020, Sarah Paulson confirmed the start of production.

== Promotion ==
In October 2015, FX released its first promotional trailer for The People v. O. J. Simpson, showing an Akita dog whining, walking from its residence onto a sidewalk to bark, then walking back to its residence, leaving behind bloody paw prints. Later that month another teaser was released, wherein the first actual footage of Travolta as Shapiro was shown. In the teaser, Shapiro is about to ask Simpson (whose face is unseen) if he is responsible for the murder of Simpson's ex-wife. In the next short teaser that was released, Simpson (again unseen) is taking a lie detector test.

In November, two new teasers were released. The first shows Simpson writing his attempted suicide letter, while a voice-over by Gooding Jr. narrates. The second shows the police chasing Simpson's white Ford Bronco, while dozens of fans cheer for him.

The first full trailer was released in December, along with a poster for the season. The trailer included Simpson sitting in the childhood bedroom of Kim Kardashian and contemplating suicide while Robert Kardashian tries to stop him.

In September 2017, FX released the first promotional teaser for The Assassination of Gianni Versace, showing doves sitting outside Versace's former mansion and flying away when two gunshots ring out. A second teaser was released that same month, depicting Versace's sister Donatella placing flowers on a casket.

== Broadcast ==
The series first premiered worldwide in Canada on FX on February 2, 2016. In the Philippines, the series premiered on February 3, 2016, on CT. In India, the series premiered on STAR World Premiere HD and Hotstar on February 8, 2016. The first series premiered in the United Kingdom on February 15, 2016. The second series began on February 28, 2018, on BBC Two. In Israel, the series premiered on February 22, 2016. In Australia, the series' first season was promoted as a "miniseries" under the title The People vs OJ Simpson and premiered on Network Ten on March 6, 2016, before concluding on May 8, 2016. The series aired at 10:15 p.m. on Thursdays on RTÉ One in Ireland from October 2016.

The first 2 seasons were made available on Netflix worldwide excluding Canada and German-speaking Europe (Germany, Austria, Switzerland) in February 2017. However, on March 1, 2022, the show was pulled from Netflix globally, shifting to Hulu in the United States the same month. It has also started to shift to Disney+ internationally and Star+ in Latin America.

== Reception ==
=== Critical response ===
Critical response of American Crime Story
Season	Rotten Tomatoes	Metacritic
The People v. O. J. Simpson	97% (94 reviews)	90 (45 reviews)
The Assassination of Gianni Versace	88% (98 reviews)	74 (35 reviews)
Impeachment	69% (74 reviews)	61 (34 reviews)

The first season of American Crime Story has received critical acclaim. The review aggregator Rotten Tomatoes gave the season an approval rating of 97%, based on 94 reviews, with an average rating of 8.8/10. The site's critical consensus reads, "American Crime Story: The People v. O.J. Simpson brings top-shelf writing, directing, and acting to bear on a still-topical story while shedding further light on the facts – and provoking passionate responses along the way" On Metacritic, the season has a score of 90 out of 100, based on 45 critics, indicating "universal acclaim".

The second season of American Crime Story received positive reviews. The review aggregator Rotten Tomatoes gave the season an approval rating of 88%, based on 98 reviews, with an average rating of 7.2/10. The site's critical consensus reads, "The Assassination of Versace starts with a bang and unfurls slowly, moving backward through an intricate (and occasionally convoluted) murder mystery anchored by a career-defining performance from Darren Criss." On Metacritic, the season has a score of 74 out of 100, based on 35 critics, indicating "generally favorable reviews".

The third season of American Crime Story received mixed reviews. The review aggregator Rotten Tomatoes gave the season an approval rating of 69%, based on 74 reviews. The site's critical consensus reads, "Impeachment can't seem to decide whether it's unearthing the humanity of a presidential scandal or indulging the mythology of its media circus, but Beanie Feldstein and Sarah Paulson's performances ring true in the midst of all the noise." On Metacritic, the season has a score of 61 out of 100, based on 34 critics, indicating "generally favorable reviews".

=== Ratings ===
American Crime Story : U.S. viewers per episode (millions)

Season	Episode number										Average
Season	1	2	3	4	5	6	7	8	9	10	Average
The People vs. O.J. Simpson	5.12	3.90	3.34	3.00	2.73	3.00	2.89	2.91	2.76	3.27	3.29
The Assassination of Gianni Versace	2.22	1.42	1.26	0.98	0.91	1.10	0.92	1.00	1.20	–	1.22
Impeachment	0.92	0.69	0.66	0.61	0.54	0.55	0.61	0.62	0.59	0.54	0.63

Audience measurement performed by Nielsen Media Research

== Accolades ==
Impeachment: American Crime Story was recognized with the ReFrame Stamp. The stamp is awarded by the gender equity coalition ReFrame and industry database IMDbPro for film and television projects that are proven to have gender-balanced hiring, with stamps being awarded to projects that hire female-identifying people, especially women of color, in four out of eight key roles for their production.

Accolades received by American Crime Story
Award	Year	Category	Recipient(s)	Result	Ref.
American Cinema Editors Awards	2017	Best Edited Miniseries or Motion Picture for Television	Adam Penn, Stewart Schill and C. Chi-yoon Chung (for "Marcia, Marcia, Marcia")	Nominated	
American Cinema Editors Awards	2019	Best Edited Miniseries or Motion Picture for Television	Emily Greene (for "A Random Killing")	Nominated	
Artios Awards	2017	Television Movie or Mini-Series	The People v. O. J. Simpson	Nominated	
Artios Awards	2019	Limited Series	The Assassination of Gianni Versace	Nominated	
American Film Institute Awards	2016	Top 10 Television Programs	The People v. O. J. Simpson	Won	
American Film Institute Awards	2018	Top 10 Television Programs	The Assassination of Gianni Versace	Won	
Art Directors Guild Awards	2017	Excellence in Production Design for a Television Movie or Limited Series	Jeffrey Mossa (for "100% Not Guilty"," ""Marcia, Marcia, Marcia"," ""Manna From Heaven")	Nominated	
Art Directors Guild Awards	2019	Excellence in Production Design for a Television Movie or Limited Series	Judy Becker	Nominated	
American Society of Composers, Authors and Publishers Awards	2022	Top Rated Television Series	Andrew Skrabutenas (for Impeachment: American Crime Story)	Won	
BET Awards	2016	Best Actor	Courtney B. Vance	Nominated	
British Academy Television Awards	2017	Best International Program	Ryan Murphy, Nina Jacobson, Brad Simpson	Won	
Cinema Audio Society Awards	2017	Outstanding Achievement in Sound Mixing for a Television Movie or Mini-Series	John Bauman, Joe Earle, Doug Andham, Judah Getz and John Guentner	Won	
Cinema Audio Society Awards	2019	Outstanding Achievement in Sound Mixing for a Television Movie or Mini-Series	John Bauman, Joe Earle, Doug Andham, Judah Getz, Arno Stephanian (for "The Man Who Would Be Vogue"	Won	
Costume Designers Guild Awards	2019	Excellence in Contemporary Television	Lou Eyrich and Allison Leach	Won	
Critics' Choice Television Awards	2015	Most Exciting New Series	American Crime Story	Won	
Critics' Choice Television Awards	2016	Best Movie/Miniseries	The People v. O. J. Simpson: American Crime Story	Won	
Critics' Choice Television Awards	2016	Best Actor in a Movie or Miniseries	Cuba Gooding Jr.	Nominated	
Critics' Choice Television Awards	2016	Best Actor in a Movie or Miniseries	Courtney B. Vance	Won	
Critics' Choice Television Awards	2016	Best Actress in a Movie/Miniseries	Sarah Paulson	Won	
Critics' Choice Television Awards	2016	Best Supporting Actor in a Movie/Miniseries	Sterling K. Brown	Won	
Critics' Choice Television Awards	2016	Best Supporting Actor in a Movie/Miniseries	John Travolta	Nominated	
Critics' Choice Television Awards	2019	Best Limited Series	The Assassination of Gianni Versace	Won	
Critics' Choice Television Awards	2019	Best Actor in a Movie/Limited Series	Darren Criss	Won	
Critics' Choice Television Awards	2019	Best Supporting Actor in a Movie/Limited Series	Finn Wittrock	Nominated	
Critics' Choice Television Awards	2019	Best Supporting Actress in a Movie/Limited Series	Penélope Cruz	Nominated	
Critics' Choice Television Awards	2019	Best Supporting Actress in a Movie/Limited Series	Judith Light	Nominated	
Directors Guild of America Awards	2017	Best Miniseries or Television Film	Ryan Murphy (for "From the Ashes of Tragedy")	Nominated	
Directors Guild of America Awards	2017	Best Miniseries or Television Film	John Singleton (for "The Race Card")	Nominated	
Dorian Awards	2017	TV Drama of the Year	The People v. O. J. Simpson	Won	
Dorian Awards	2017	TV Performance of the Year — Actor	Sterling K. Brown	Nominated	
Dorian Awards	2017	TV Performance of the Year — Actor	Courtney B. Vance	Nominated	
Dorian Awards	2017	TV Performance of the Year — Actress	Sarah Paulson	Won	
Dorian Awards	2019	TV Drama of the Year	The Assassination of Gianni Versace	Nominated	
Dorian Awards	2019	TV Performance of the Year — Actor	Darren Criss	Nominated	
Dorian Awards	2019	LGBTQ TV Show of the Year	The Assassination of Gianni Versace	Nominated	
GLAAD Media Awards	2019	Outstanding TV-Movie or Limited Series	The Assassination of Gianni Versace	Won	
Golden Globe Awards	2017	Best Miniseries or Television Film	The People v. O. J. Simpson	Won	
Golden Globe Awards	2017	Best Actor – Miniseries or Television Film	Courtney B. Vance	Nominated	
Golden Globe Awards	2017	Best Actress – Miniseries or Television Film	Sarah Paulson	Won	
Golden Globe Awards	2017	Best Supporting Actor – Series, Miniseries or Television Film	Sterling K. Brown	Nominated	
Golden Globe Awards	2017	Best Supporting Actor – Series, Miniseries or Television Film	John Travolta	Nominated	
Golden Globe Awards	2019	Best Miniseries or Television Film	The Assassination of Gianni Versace	Won	
Golden Globe Awards	2019	Best Actor – Miniseries or Television Film	Darren Criss	Won	
Golden Globe Awards	2019	Best Supporting Actor – Series, Miniseries or Television Film	Édgar Ramírez	Nominated	
Golden Globe Awards	2019	Best Supporting Actress – Series, Miniseries or Television Film	Penélope Cruz	Nominated	
Golden Globe Awards	2022	Best Limited Series or TV Movie	Impeachment: American Crime Story	Nominated	
Golden Trailer Awards	2017	Best Documentary/Reality TV Series Poster	The People v. O. J. Simpson	Won	
Guild of Music Supervisors Awards	2017	Best Music Supervision in a Television Limited Series or Movie	PJ Bloom (for The People v. O. J. Simpson)	Won	
Guild of Music Supervisors Awards	2019	Best Music Supervision in a Television Limited Series or Movie	Amanda Krieg Thomas (for The Assassination of Gianni Versace)	Nominated	
Guild of Music Supervisors Awards	2019	Best Song/Recording Created for Television	"Drive" by Aimee Mann and Ric Ocasek (for "House By the Lake")	Nominated	
Hollywood Critics Association TV Awards	2022	Best Broadcast Network or Cable Limited or Anthology Series	Impeachment	Nominated	
Hollywood Critics Association TV Awards	2022	Best Actress in a Broadcast Network or Cable Limited or Anthology Series	Sarah Paulson	Won	
Hollywood Critics Association TV Awards	2022	Best Directing in a Broadcast Network or Cable Limited or Anthology Series	Ryan Murphy	Nominated	
Hollywood Critics Association TV Awards	2022	Best Writing in a Broadcast Network or Cable Limited or Anthology Series	Sarah Burgess	Nominated	
Make-Up Artists and Hair Stylists Guild Awards	2022	Best Special Make-Up Effects	Justin Raleigh, Kelly Golden, Chris Hampton, Thom Floutz	Nominated	
Make-Up Artists and Hair Stylists Guild Awards	2022	Best Period and/or Character Hair Styling	Natalie Driscoll, Michelle Ceglia	Nominated	
Make-Up Artists and Hair Stylists Guild Awards	2022	Best Period and/or Character Make-Up	Robin Beauchesne, KarrieAnne Heisner Sillay, Angela Moos, Erin LaBre	Nominated	
MTV Movie & TV Awards	2018	Best Performance in a Show	Darren Criss	Nominated	
People's Choice Awards	2018	The Drama TV Star of 2018	The Assassination of Gianni Versace: American Crime Story	Nominated	
Primetime Creative Arts Emmy Awards	2016	Outstanding Casting for a Limited Series, Movie, or Special	Jeanne McCarthy, Nicole Abellera Hallman, Courtney Bright, and Nicole Daniels	Won	
Primetime Creative Arts Emmy Awards	2016	Outstanding Cinematography for a Limited Series or Movie	Nelson Cragg (for "From the Ashes of Tragedy")	Nominated	
Primetime Creative Arts Emmy Awards	2016	Outstanding Costumes for a Period/Fantasy Series, Limited Series, or Movie	Hala Bahmet, Marina Ray, and Elinor Bardach (for "Marcia, Marcia, Marcia")	Nominated	
Primetime Creative Arts Emmy Awards	2016	Outstanding Hairstyling for a Limited Series or Movie	Chris Clark, Natalie Driscoll, Shay Sanford-Fong, and Katrina Chevalier	Won	
Primetime Creative Arts Emmy Awards	2016	Outstanding Makeup for a Limited Series or Movie (Non-Prosthetic)	Eryn Krueger Mekash, Zoe Hay, Heather Plott, Deborah Huss Humphries, Luis Garcia, and Becky Cotton	Nominated	
Primetime Creative Arts Emmy Awards	2016	Outstanding Single-Camera Picture Editing for a Limited Series or Movie	Adam Penn (for "From the Ashes of Tragedy")	Nominated	
Primetime Creative Arts Emmy Awards	2016	Outstanding Single-Camera Picture Editing for a Limited Series or Movie	C. Chi-Yoon Chung (for "The Race Card")	Won	
Primetime Creative Arts Emmy Awards	2016	Outstanding Single-Camera Picture Editing for a Limited Series or Movie	Stewart Schill (for "The Verdict")	Nominated	
Primetime Creative Arts Emmy Awards	2016	Outstanding Sound Mixing for a Limited Series or Movie	Doug Andham, Joe Earle, and John Bauman (for "From the Ashes of Tragedy")	Won	
Primetime Creative Arts Emmy Awards	2018	Outstanding Casting for a Limited Series, Movie, or Special	Courtney Bright and Nicole Daniels	Won	
Primetime Creative Arts Emmy Awards	2018	Outstanding Contemporary Costumes	Lou Eyrich, Allison Leach, Rebecca Guzzi and Nora Pedersen (for "The Man Who Would Be Vogue")	Won	
Primetime Creative Arts Emmy Awards	2018	Outstanding Hairstyling for a Limited Series or Movie	Chris Clark, Natalie Driscoll, Shay Sanford-Fong, and Helena Cepeda	Won	
Primetime Creative Arts Emmy Awards	2018	Outstanding Make-up for a Limited Series or Movie (Non-Prosthetic)	Eryn Krueger Mekash, Robin Beauchesne, Silvina Knight, David Williams, Ana Lozano, Tym Buacharern	Won	
Primetime Creative Arts Emmy Awards	2018	Outstanding Prosthetic Makeup for a Series, Limited Series, Movie or Special	Eryn Krueger Mekash, Mike Mekash, Silvina Knight, Robin Beauchesne, David LeRoy Anderson, Glen Eisner	Nominated	
Primetime Creative Arts Emmy Awards	2018	Outstanding Single-Camera Picture Editing for a Limited Series or Movie	Emily Greene (for "Alone")	Nominated	
Primetime Creative Arts Emmy Awards	2018	Outstanding Single-Camera Picture Editing for a Limited Series or Movie	Shelly Westerman (for "House By the Lake")	Nominated	
Primetime Creative Arts Emmy Awards	2018	Outstanding Single-Camera Picture Editing for a Limited Series or Movie	Chi-Yoon Chung (for "Manhunt")	Nominated	
Primetime Creative Arts Emmy Awards	2018	Outstanding Sound Mixing for a Limited Series or Movie	Doug Andham, Joe Earle, John Bauman, Judah Getz (for "The Man Who Would Be Vogue")	Nominated	
Primetime Creative Arts Emmy Awards	2022	Outstanding Contemporary Hairstyling	Natalie Driscoll, Nanxy Tong-Heater, Michelle Ceglia, Suzy Mazzarese, Lauren Kress, and Leighann Pitchon (for "The Assassination of Monica Lewinsky")	Won	
Primetime Creative Arts Emmy Awards	2022	Outstanding Contemporary Makeup (Non-Prosthetic)	Robin Beauchesne, KarriAnn Sillay, Angela Moos, Erin LeBre, and Kerrin Jackson (for "The Assassination of Monica Lewinsky")	Nominated	
Primetime Creative Arts Emmy Awards	2022	Outstanding Prosthetic Makeup	Justin Raleigh, Greg Cannom, Thomas Floutz, Chris Hampton, and Kelly Golden (for "The Wilderness")	Nominated	
Primetime Emmy Awards	2016	Outstanding Limited Series	The People v. O. J. Simpson	Won	
Primetime Emmy Awards	2016	Outstanding Lead Actor in a Limited Series or Movie	Courtney B. Vance	Won	
Primetime Emmy Awards	2016	Outstanding Lead Actor in a Limited Series or Movie	Cuba Gooding Jr.	Nominated	
Primetime Emmy Awards	2016	Outstanding Lead Actress in a Limited Series or Movie	Sarah Paulson	Won	
Primetime Emmy Awards	2016	Outstanding Supporting Actor in a Limited Series or Movie	Sterling K. Brown	Won	
Primetime Emmy Awards	2016	Outstanding Supporting Actor in a Limited Series or Movie	David Schwimmer	Nominated	
Primetime Emmy Awards	2016	Outstanding Supporting Actor in a Limited Series or Movie	John Travolta	Nominated	
Primetime Emmy Awards	2016	Outstanding Directing for a Limited Series, Movie, or Dramatic Special	Ryan Murphy (for "From the Ashes of Tragedy")	Nominated	
Primetime Emmy Awards	2016	Outstanding Directing for a Limited Series, Movie, or Dramatic Special	John Singleton (for "The Race Card")	Nominated	
Primetime Emmy Awards	2016	Outstanding Directing for a Limited Series, Movie, or Dramatic Special	Anthony Hemingway (for "Manna from Heaven")	Nominated	
Primetime Emmy Awards	2016	Outstanding Writing for a Limited Series, Movie, or Dramatic Special	Scott Alexander & Larry Karaszewski (for "From the Ashes of Tragedy")	Nominated	
Primetime Emmy Awards	2016	Outstanding Writing for a Limited Series, Movie, or Dramatic Special	Joe Robert Cole (for "The Race Card")	Nominated	
Primetime Emmy Awards	2016	Outstanding Writing for a Limited Series, Movie, or Dramatic Special	D. V. DeVincentis (for "Marcia, Marcia, Marcia")	Won	
Primetime Emmy Awards	2018	Outstanding Limited Series	The Assassination of Gianni Versace: American Crime Story	Won	
Primetime Emmy Awards	2018	Outstanding Lead Actor in a Limited Series or Movie	Darren Criss	Won	
Primetime Emmy Awards	2018	Outstanding Supporting Actor in a Limited Series or Movie	Ricky Martin	Nominated	
Primetime Emmy Awards	2018	Outstanding Supporting Actor in a Limited Series or Movie	Édgar Ramírez	Nominated	
Primetime Emmy Awards	2018	Outstanding Supporting Actor in a Limited Series or Movie	Finn Wittrock	Nominated	
Primetime Emmy Awards	2018	Outstanding Supporting Actress in a Limited Series or Movie	Penélope Cruz	Nominated	
Primetime Emmy Awards	2018	Outstanding Supporting Actress in a Limited Series or Movie	Judith Light	Nominated	
Primetime Emmy Awards	2018	Outstanding Directing for a Limited Series, Movie or Dramatic Special	Ryan Murphy (for "The Man Who Would Be Vogue")	Won	
Primetime Emmy Awards	2018	Outstanding Writing for a Limited Series, Movie or Dramatic Special	Tom Rob Smith (for "House by the Lake")	Nominated	
Primetime Emmy Awards	2022	Outstanding Lead Actress in a Limited or Anthology Series or Movie	Sarah Paulson	Nominated	
Primetime Emmy Awards	2022	Outstanding Writing for a Limited or Anthology Series or Movie	Sarah Burgess (for "Man Handled")	Nominated	
Producers Guild of America Awards	2017	David L. Wolper Award for Outstanding Producer of Limited Series Television	Various (Note: Scott Alexander, Larry Karaszewski, Ryan Murphy, Brad Falchuk, Nina Jacobson, Brad Simpson, D.V. DeVincentis, Anthony Hemingway, Alexis Martin Woodall, John Travolta, and Chip Vucelich)	Won	
Producers Guild of America Awards	2019	David L. Wolper Award for Outstanding Producer of Limited Series Television	Various (Note: Ryan Murphy, Nina Jacobson, Brad Simpson, Alexis Martin Woodall, Tom Rob Smith, Daniel Minahan, Brad Falchuk, Scott Alexander, Larry Karaszewski, Chip Vucelich, Maggie Cohn, Eric Kovtun, Lou Eyrich, and Eryn Krueger Mekash)	Won	
Satellite Awards	2016	Best Miniseries or Television Film	The People v. O. J. Simpson: American Crime Story	Won	
Satellite Awards	2016	Best Actor in a Miniseries or Television Film	Courtney B. Vance	Nominated	
Satellite Awards	2016	Best Actor in a Miniseries or Television Film	Cuba Gooding Jr.	Nominated	
Satellite Awards	2016	Best Actress in a Miniseries or Television Film	Sarah Paulson	Won	
Satellite Awards	2017	Best Miniseries	The Assassination of Gianni Versace	Won	
Satellite Awards	2017	Best Actor in a Miniseries or TV Film	Darren Criss	Won	
Satellite Awards	2017	Best Supporting Actor in a Series, Miniseries or TV Film	Édgar Ramírez	Nominated	
Satellite Awards	2017	Best Supporting Actress in a Series, Miniseries or TV Film	Penélope Cruz	Nominated	
Satellite Awards	2017	Best Ensemble: Television	The Assassination of Gianni Versace	Won	
Satellite Awards	2022	Best Actress in a Drama/Genre Series	Beanie Feldstein	Nominated	
Satellite Awards	2022	Best Actor in a Miniseries, Limited Series, or Motion Picture Made for Television	Clive Owen	Nominated	
Satellite Awards	2022	Best Actress in a Supporting Role in a Miniseries, Limited Series, or Motion Picture Made for Television	Sarah Paulson	Nominated	
Screen Actors Guild Awards	2016	Outstanding Performance by a Male Actor in a Television Movie or Limited Series	Sterling K. Brown	Nominated	
Screen Actors Guild Awards	2016	Outstanding Performance by a Male Actor in a Television Movie or Limited Series	Courtney B. Vance	Nominated	
Screen Actors Guild Awards	2016	Outstanding Performance by a Female Actor in a Television Movie or Limited Series	Sarah Paulson	Won	
Screen Actors Guild Awards	2019	Outstanding Performance by a Male Actor in a Miniseries or Television Movie	Darren Criss	Won	
Screen Actors Guild Awards	2019	Outstanding Performance by a Female Actor in a Miniseries or Television Movie	Penélope Cruz	Nominated	
Society of Camera Operators Awards	2017	Camera Operator of the Year – Television	Andrew Mitchell	Won	
TCA Awards	2016	Program of the Year	The People v. O. J. Simpson: American Crime Story	Won	
TCA Awards	2016	Outstanding Achievement in Movies, Miniseries and Specials	The People v. O. J. Simpson: American Crime Story	Won	
TCA Awards	2016	Individual Achievement in Drama	Sarah Paulson	Won	
TCA Awards	2016	Individual Achievement in Drama	Courtney B. Vance	Nominated	
Writers Guild of America Awards	2016	Long Form – Adapted	Scott Alexander, Joe Robert Cole, D.V. DeVincentis, Maya Forbes, Larry Karaszewski, and Wally Wolodarsky	Won	
Writers Guild of America Awards	2018	Long Form – Adapted	Maggie Cohn and Tom Rob Smith	Won	
Writers Guild of America Awards	2021	Long Form – Adapted	Flora Birnbaum, Sarah Burgess, Halley Feiffer and Daniel Pearle	Nominated	

== See also ==
- Monster (American TV series), a true crime anthology series created by Ryan Murphy and Ian Brennan for Netflix.
