= Clinton v. Jones =

- Supreme Court of the United States

Argued January 13, 1997 Decided May 27, 1997
- Full case name: William Jefferson Clinton, President of the United States of America, Petitioner v. Paula Corbin Jones
- Citations: 520 U.S. 681 (more) 117 S. Ct. 1636; 137 L. Ed. 2d 945; 1997 U.S. LEXIS 3254; 65 U.S.L.W. 4372; 73 Fair Empl. Prac. Cas. (BNA) 1548; 73 Fair Empl. Prac. Cas. (BNA) 1549; 70 Empl. Prac. Dec. (CCH) ¶ 44,686; 97 Cal. Daily Op. Service 3908; 97 Daily Journal DAR 6669; 10 Fla. L. Weekly Fed. S 499
- Argument: Oral argument

Case history
- Prior: Motion to defer granted, motion for immunity denied, 869 F. Supp. 690 (E.D. Ark. 1994); motion to defer reversed, 72 F.3d 1354 (8th Cir. 1996)
- Subsequent: Motion for summary judgment granted, 990 F. Supp. 657 (E.D. Ark. 1998); motion affirmed, 161 F.3d 528 (8th Cir. 1998)

Holding
- The Constitution does not protect the President from federal civil litigation involving actions committed before entering office. There is no requirement to stay the case until the President leaves office.

Court membership
- Chief Justice William Rehnquist Associate Justices John P. Stevens · Sandra Day O'Connor; Antonin Scalia · Anthony Kennedy; David Souter · Clarence Thomas; Ruth Bader Ginsburg · Stephen Breyer

Case opinions
- Majority: Stevens, joined by Rehnquist, O'Connor, Scalia, Kennedy, Souter, Thomas, Ginsburg
- Concurrence: Breyer (in judgment)

Laws applied
- U.S. Const. art. II

Clinton v. Jones, 520 U.S. 681 (1997), is a landmark United States Supreme Court case establishing that a sitting president of the United States has no immunity from civil law litigation, in federal court, for acts done before taking office and unrelated to the office. In particular, there is no temporary immunity and thus no delay of federal cases until the president leaves office.

== Background of the case ==
On May 6, 1994, former Arkansas state employee Paula Jones filed a sexual harassment suit against U.S. president Bill Clinton and former Arkansas State Police Officer Danny Ferguson. She claimed that on May 8, 1991, Clinton, then Governor of Arkansas, propositioned her. David Brock had written, in the January 1994 issue of The American Spectator, that an Arkansas state employee named "Paula" had offered to be Clinton's mistress. According to the story, Ferguson had escorted Jones to Clinton's hotel room, stood guard, and overheard Jones say that she would not mind being Clinton's mistress.

The initial suit, Jones v. Clinton, was filed in the U.S. District Court for the Eastern District of Arkansas. Jones, represented by attorneys Joseph Cammarata and Gilbert K. Davis, sought civil damages from the President. Clinton's request to file a motion to dismiss the case on the grounds of presidential immunity was approved on July 21, 1994. On December 28, 1994, Judge Susan Webber Wright ruled that a sitting president could not be sued and deferred the case until the conclusion of his term, essentially granting him temporary immunity (although she allowed the pre-trial discovery phase of the case to proceed without delay in order to start the trial as soon as Clinton left office).

Both parties appealed to the United States Court of Appeals for the Eighth Circuit, which ruled in favor of Jones, finding that "the President, like all other government officials, is subject to the same laws that apply to all other members of our society."

Clinton then appealed to the U.S. Supreme Court, filing a petition for writ of certiorari.

== Supreme Court's decision ==
In a unanimous decision, the Supreme Court affirmed the decision of the Court of Appeals. In the majority opinion by Justice John Paul Stevens, the Court ruled that separation of powers does not mandate that federal courts delay all private civil lawsuits against the president until the end of his term of office.

The court ruled that they did not need to decide "whether a claim comparable to petitioner's assertion of immunity might succeed in a state tribunal" (a state court), but noted that "If this case were being heard in a state forum, instead of advancing a separation-of-powers argument, petitioner would presumably rely on federalism and comity concerns". The court also found that "our decision rejecting the immunity claim and allowing the case to proceed does not require us to confront the question whether a court may compel the attendance of the president at any specific time or place." In his concurring opinion, Breyer argued that presidential immunity would apply only if the president could show that a private civil lawsuit would somehow interfere with the president's constitutionally assigned duties.

== Aftermath ==
On April 1, 1998, U.S. District Court Judge Susan Webber Wright granted summary judgment to Clinton in Jones v. Clinton, ruling that Jones showed inability to prove that she was injured, personally or in her career. A witness in Jones v. Clinton, Monica Lewinsky, denied having engaged in a sexual relationship with Clinton. A friend of Lewinsky, Linda Tripp, had recorded conversations where Lewinsky discussed her affair with Clinton. Tripp then turned the tapes over to Kenneth Starr, an independent counsel investigating Clinton's misconduct in office. The revelations from these tapes became known as the Lewinsky scandal.

In the Court's opinion in Clinton v. Jones, Stevens had written, "...it appears to us highly unlikely to occupy any substantial amount of petitioner's time." The Supreme Court's ruling in Clinton v. Jones led to the District Court's hearing of Jones v. Clinton, which led to the Lewinsky scandal, when Clinton was asked under oath about other workplace relationships, which led to charges of perjury and obstruction of justice and the impeachment of Bill Clinton.

On April 12, 1999, Wright found Clinton in contempt of court for "intentionally false" testimony in Jones v. Clinton, fined him $90,000, and referred the case to the Arkansas Supreme Court's Committee on Professional Conduct, as Clinton still possessed a law license in Arkansas.

The Arkansas Supreme Court suspended Clinton's Arkansas law license in April 2000. On January 19, 2001, Clinton agreed to a five-year suspension and a $25,000 fine in order to avoid disbarment and to end the investigation of Independent Counsel Robert Ray (Starr's successor). On October 1, 2001, Clinton's U.S. Supreme Court law license was suspended, with 40 days to contest his disbarment. On November 9, 2001, the last day for Clinton to contest the disbarment, he opted to resign from the Supreme Court Bar, surrendering his license, rather than facing penalties related to disbarment.

In the end, Independent Counsel Ray said:

The Independent Counsel's judgment that sufficient evidence existed to prosecute President Clinton was confirmed by President Clinton's admissions and by evidence showing that he engaged in conduct prejudicial to the administration of justice.

More specifically, the Independent Counsel concluded that President Clinton testified falsely on three counts under oath in Clinton v. Jones. However, Ray chose to decline criminal prosecution in favor of what the Principles of Federal Prosecution call "alternative sanctions". This included being impeached:

As a consequence of his conduct in the Jones v. Clinton civil suit and before the federal grand jury, President Clinton incurred significant administrative sanctions. The Independent Counsel considered seven non-criminal alternative sanctions that were imposed in making his decision to decline prosecution: (1) President Clinton's admission of providing false testimony that was knowingly misleading, evasive, and prejudicial to the administration of justice before the United States District Court for the Eastern District of Arkansas; (2) his acknowledgement that his conduct violated the Rules of Professional Conduct of the Arkansas Supreme Court; (3) the five-year suspension of his license to practice law and $25,000 fine imposed on him by the Circuit Court of Pulaski County, Arkansas; (4) the civil contempt penalty of more than $90,000 imposed on President Clinton by the federal court for violating its orders; (5) the payment of more than $850,000 in settlement to Paula Jones; (6) the express finding by the federal court that President Clinton had engaged in contemptuous conduct; and (7) the substantial public condemnation of President Clinton arising from his impeachment.

These seven sanctions, Ray reasoned, were "sufficient", and therefore he did not pursue further sanctions in a criminal proceeding.

== See also ==
- Nixon v. Fitzgerald (1982)
