= Lucianne Goldberg =

American literary agent and author (1935–2022)

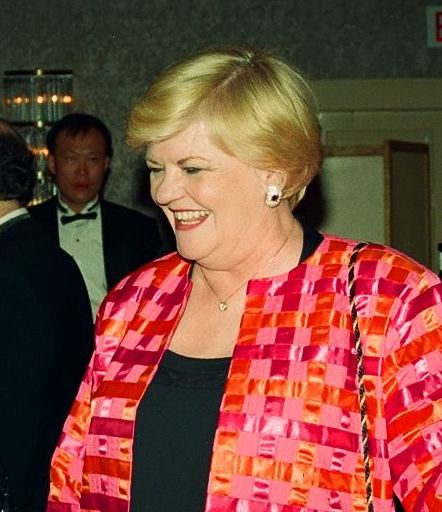
- Goldberg interviewed by Ellen Ratner at the White House Correspondents' Dinner in Washington D.C., April 1998
- Born: Lucianne Steinberger; April 29, 1935; Boston, Massachusetts, U.S.
- Died: October 26, 2022 (aged 87); Weehawken, New Jersey, U.S.
- Other name: Lucianne Cummings
- Education: George Washington University (BA)
- Occupations: Literary agent; author
- Known for: Clinton–Lewinsky scandal – encouraged Linda Tripp to illegally record telephone conversations
- Spouses: William Cummings (divorced); Sidney Goldberg (m. 1966; died 2005)
- Website: Official website

Lucianne Goldberg (née Steinberger; April 29, 1935 – October 26, 2022), also known as Lucianne Cummings, was an American literary agent and author. She was named as one of the "key players" in the 1998 impeachment of President Clinton. She controversially advised Monica Lewinsky's confidante Linda Tripp to tape Lewinsky's phone calls about their affair. The 20 hours of recordings became crucial to the Starr investigation. She was the mother of Jonah Goldberg, a conservative political commentator, and Joshua Goldberg, a Republican nominee who ran for New York City Council.

== Early life and education ==
She was born Lucianne Steinberger in Boston to Dr. Raymond Leonard and Lucy Jane (née Moseley) von Steinberger. She grew up in Alexandria, Virginia near Washington, D.C., where her father was employed as a government physicist, and her mother was a physiotherapist. She attended high school in Alexandria, leaving at age 16 to begin working. She married her high school sweetheart, William Cummings; the couple separated after three years of marriage and later divorced.

== Early career ==
Goldberg started her career at The Washington Post, during her secondary education. She sought to be a press aide in Lyndon Johnson's unsuccessful 1960 campaign for president. After John F. Kennedy won the Democratic nomination, she got a position with the Democratic National Committee followed by a spot on Kennedy's Inaugural Committee.

Goldberg said she was on Kennedy's White House staff, but according to The Washington Post, her name does not appear on any staff records. In response, she said she worked in the Old Executive Office Building doing opposition research and then worked in the National Press Building in public relations.

== Public relations firm ==
In 1963, she opened a one-person public relations firm, Lucianne Cummings & Associates. She received national media attention in 1965 when she attempted to sell a handwritten note from Jackie Kennedy to Lady Bird Johnson through an auction house for $1000 ($10216 in today's dollars). She had come into possession of the note when acting as a messenger for Kennedy in 1960. After hearing of the auction, the First Lady became irate and demanded that the note be returned to the White House. Cummings apologized and returned the note, then found out the next day that her income tax returns were going to be audited by the Internal Revenue Service.

In 1966, she married Sidney Goldberg, who was then the executive editor of the North American Newspaper Alliance (NANA), later acquired by United Features Syndicate. She took the name Goldberg upon her marriage and worked for the Women's News Service, also a subsidiary of United Features Syndicate.

=== Conservative activism and Watergate era ===
In 1970, Goldberg and her friend Jeannie Sakol founded an organization called the "Pussycat League" to oppose the women's liberation movement, and in 1971 she and Sakol published Purr Baby Purr, a critique of feminism.

During the 1972 presidential campaign, she joined the press corps covering Democratic candidate George McGovern claiming to be a reporter for the Women's News Service, though she was on leave of absence from that position. In fact Goldberg was being paid $1000 a week–$7697 in today's dollars–to spy on McGovern and those traveling with him on the campaign's planes. When she was recruited, she was told President Nixon himself had approved the spying, which was to include traditional political intelligence and information on personal habits: "'They were looking for really dirty stuff', [she] said. 'Who was sleeping with whom, what the Secret Service men were doing with the stewardesses, who was smoking pot on the plane–that sort of thing. I was told to send it all along.'" Goldberg's role as a reporter-spy came to light in the Watergate hearings which led to the resignation of Nixon.

Feminist Betty Friedan alleged in June 1973 that Goldberg, as an organizer of the Pussycat League, had been attempting to derail the passage of the Equal Rights Amendment by engaging in Watergate-style "dirty tricks" and by touring the country falsely telling women that they would lose their husbands and rights to family support if the amendment was passed.

=== Literary agent and author ===
Goldberg eventually set up a literary agency and became known as a promoter of "right-wing, tell-all attack books", according to The New York Times. One of her clients, celebrity biographer Kitty Kelley, sued her in 1983 over proceeds from foreign sales of Kelley's unauthorized biography on Elizabeth Taylor. Kelley ultimately won a judgment of $40,000, with the judge declaring that Goldberg was only guilty of "sloppy bookkeeping". Goldberg was also the U.S. agent for the memoirs of Prince Charles' former valet, which were blocked for publication in England by Queen Elizabeth.

In the early 1990s, Goldberg promoted a conspiracy theory book about the suicide death of President Bill Clinton's White House aide, Vince Foster, and several books dealing with Clinton's purported sexual infidelities including one reported by Arkansas state troopers who alleged they had procured women to have sex with then-Governor Bill Clinton. None of the books about Clinton were ever published. Goldberg was also the agent for former detective Mark Fuhrman's bestselling account of the O. J. Simpson trial, Murder in Brentwood.

Goldberg penned several novels. Friends in High Places co-written with Sondra Robinson, was published in 1979. Her first solo novel Madame Cleo's Girls, a story of three high-priced call girls, was published in 1992, followed by People Will Talk in 1994. Goldberg ghostwrote for celebrities; the romance novel Washington Wives (1987) (penned under the name of Maureen Dean, wife of Watergate figure John Dean) is one of her behind-the-scenes works.

== Monica Lewinsky scandal ==
=== The Tripp tapes ===
Goldberg met Linda Tripp in 1993 or 1994 while working on the proposal for the book on the death of President Bill Clinton's aide Vince Foster. The two women became friends and in 1997 Goldberg advised Tripp to secretly record former White House intern, Monica Lewinsky, talking about her sexual relationship with President Bill Clinton. Goldberg advised Tripp that it was legal to record phone conversations in Maryland without the consent of the other party; in fact, it was illegal to do so.

Goldberg urged Tripp to take the resulting 20 hours of tapes to special prosecutor Kenneth Starr, who had a broad mandate to investigate improprieties by Clinton. Goldberg also brought the tapes to the attention of lawyers working on the Paula Jones sexual harassment case against Clinton. The tapes became crucial to Starr's investigation on whether Clinton committed perjury during a sworn deposition when he denied his affair with Lewinsky, which led to his impeachment by the U.S. House of Representatives and acquittal by the U.S. Senate.

Soon after the secret taping began in the fall of 1997, Goldberg arranged for Tripp to speak with Newsweek reporter Michael Isikoff, who had been investigating other allegations about Clinton's sex life. After the scandal became public in January 1998, the media interviewed Goldberg frequently. She declared that the tapes proved that Lewinsky and Clinton had had a sexual relationship, and previewed other highlights of the Clinton–Lewinsky affair such as the existence of a semen-stained dress which later proved to have Clinton's DNA.

The Washington Post called her "the producer and publicist" who set the stage for the scandal and the investigation; she called herself the "facilitator". Of Goldberg's role in the scandal, Time said, "At a minimum, she is forever sealed in history as the New York City literary agent who uttered to her friend the most ruinous sentence of the Clinton presidency: 'Linda, buy a tape recorder.'" Author Jeffrey Toobin named her as one of the seven "Key Players" in the impeachment.

Goldberg said her actions in helping to disclose the Lewinsky–Clinton affair were motivated by her sense that general morality had declined and that America needed "a wake-up call". She also said that the disclosure of Lewinsky's affair with Clinton helped to protect Lewinsky, who suffered from an obsessive infatuation with Clinton. During this time, Goldberg made no secret of her animus toward Clinton, saying she was glad Clinton was getting caught "at something" and that "[i]f it took this to get him, fine". She also said she was a political independent, although she was said in the press to have long-standing ties to the Republican Party.

=== Repercussions ===
After the disclosures about the Clinton–Lewinsky affair, Goldberg was subjected to media attacks on her character and past business dealings. The Democratic National Committee faxed an unflattering "information sheet" on Goldberg to reporters within days after the story broke. Goldberg admitted that slurs on her character were to be expected: "'I have never thought of myself as a victim in all this'", she [said]. "'Never. Let them take their best shot.'" She later said the scrutiny had worn her down.

Goldberg denied allegations made in the media that she was part of a vast right-wing conspiracy to bring down the presidency of Bill Clinton. When Jeffrey Toobin published his 1999 book, A Vast Conspiracy, that also alleged Goldberg had told friends that she had an affair with Lyndon Johnson, and a Washington Post writer claimed he and others had overheard Goldberg bragging about an affair with Vice President Hubert Humphrey as well, Goldberg threatened Toobin and Random House with a libel suit, denied both affairs, and denied telling any such stories.

Goldberg was subpoenaed to testify before a Maryland grand jury contemplating indicting Tripp for having made the recordings. Under Maryland law, the knowledge that such recordings were illegal was a necessary element of the crime. Goldberg explained that she had given Tripp incorrect advice, telling her it was legal to make secret recordings. Charges against Tripp were later dropped.

Liberal filmmaker Michael Moore later set up a webcam focused on the windows of Goldberg's Manhattan apartment, which he called "I See Lucy Cam". Moore's project did not violate New York State's laws. Claiming that Goldberg did not respect the privacy rights of other people, Moore wrote, "'[s]he believes in keeping an eye on persons who are a threat to the country. So do we'." Goldberg responded by "selling advertisements to be placed on her window for $1,000 a week".

== Later career ==
Goldberg was a prominent presence on the conservative website Free Republic in the late 1990s, posting under the name "Trixie". She and other conservatives, including Matt Drudge, left the site when the webmaster, in Goldberg's words, "let all the Y2K, gun-nut, Jew-baiting crazies take over [the forum] and flame the plain-old conservatives". She then founded her own website, "Lucianne.com", and for a time, was a nationally syndicated talk radio host whose show featured a Washington correspondent.

== Personal life ==
Goldberg was married to Sidney Goldberg, a newspaper executive with United Features Syndicate from 1966 until his death in 2005. The couple had two children. Joshua (1967–2011) was the editor of her websites, and was the 2009 Republican nominee for the New York City Council seat representing district number six on Manhattan's Upper West Side. He lost the election to the now Manhattan Borough President, Gale Brewer. Jonah (b. 1969) is a best selling author and conservative political commentator. The children were raised Jewish following their father's faith, while Lucianne, who grew up an Episcopalian, remained a Christian.

Goldberg died on October 26, 2022, at her home in Weehawken, New Jersey. She was 87 and suffered from liver and kidney failure prior to her death.

== Cultural depictions ==
Goldberg was portrayed by Margo Martindale in season three of American Crime Story, Impeachment.
