= Susan Carpenter-McMillan =

American activist (born 1949)

- Born: 1949 (age 76–77); Glendale, California
- Occupations: Activist, writer and feminist

Susan Carpenter-McMillan (born 1949) is an American activist and writer and a self-styled "conservative feminist" and advocate for survivors of sexual assault.

== Early life ==
Carpenter-McMillan was born and raised in Glendale, California by her parents Charles and Emma McMillan. Her father Charles was a real estate developer. She attended the University of Southern California and was a drama student there but she later dropped out and married Bill McMillan. Carpenter-McMillan worked at her mother's baby goods store to put her husband through law school.

== Career ==
In the 1980s Carpenter-McMillan joined the antiabortion movement and was a representative for the Right to Life League of Southern California. She drew media attention when she campaigned to force the Loma Linda University Medical Center to provide a heart to a dying newborn. Carpenter-McMillan left the movement in 1990 alleging that the movement was filled with misogynists.

Carpenter-McMillan is an advocate of chemical castration and played a major role in the passage of the 1996 chemical castration law in California for multiple time sex offenders.

She served as a senior advisor to Paula Jones in the 1990s during her lawsuit against President Bill Clinton. She also served as her spokesperson and chaired Jones's legal fund. In 1997 Clinton was willing to settle the lawsuit that Jones brought against him for $700,000. Carpenter-McMillan advised Jones to reject Clinton's offer because the offer did not include an apology. Jones followed Carpenter-McMillan's advice, which contradicted the advice she received from her lawyers, Gilbert Davis and Joseph Cammarata. Jones eventually settled the case with Clinton for $850,000 and no apology.

In 2000 Carpenter-McMillan was not successful when she ran for the California State Assembly against Carol Liu.

Carpenter-McMillan was portrayed by Judith Light in Impeachment: American Crime Story.
