= Joseph Cammarata =

American attorney

- Born: June 23, 1958 (age 68); Brooklyn, New York, U.S.
- Education: Georgetown University (BS, LLM); St. John’s University (JD)
- Occupation: Civil trial attorney

Joseph Cammarata is an American attorney mainly known for handling the high-profile case against President Bill Clinton, in which he represented Paula Jones in a sexual harassment lawsuit against President Clinton. Cammarata also represented seven women who alleged they were sexually assaulted by Bill Cosby in a defamation lawsuit.

== Life and career ==
Cammarata was born in Brooklyn, New York. He earned his Bachelor of Science in Foreign Service from the Georgetown University School of Foreign Service in 1980, and his Juris Doctor from St. John's University School of Law in 1983. Cammarata earned his Masters of Law (LL.M.) in Taxation from Georgetown University Law Center in 1987. He is Board Certified in Civil Trial Advocacy and Civil Pretrial Practice Advocacy by the National Board of Trial Advocacy. He is mostly known for litigating against individuals and companies that injure people, are involved in sexual misconduct or are accused of medical malpractice. Cammarata is a member of the Bar of the District of Columbia, Virginia, Maryland and New York.

Cammarata served as lead counsel for Paula Jones in a lawsuit against U.S. President Bill Clinton, Jones v. Clinton (1994), over sexual harassment allegations against Clinton during his time as Governor of Arkansas. Clinton's defense to the claim was that a sitting president could not be sued while in office. After the Eighth Circuit Court of Appeals ruled against Clinton, finding "the President, like all other government officials, is subject to the same laws that apply to all other members of our society," Clinton appealed to the U.S. Supreme Court, which returned a unanimous decision in favor of Jones in May 1997, allowing her lawsuit to proceed. On appeal, Clinton agreed to an out-of-court settlement. Gilbert Davis and Cammarata who both served as Jones' council resigned in August 1997, believing the settlement offer they had secured, which Jones refused (on advice from Susan Carpenter-McMillan), was the appropriate way to end the case. The case was later settled by a federal appeals court on November 13, 1998. The case established a precedent that a sitting President of the United States does not have immunity from civil lawsuits, and precipitated the impeachment of Bill Clinton.

Cammarata also represented seven women who alleged they were sexually assaulted by Bill Cosby in a defamation lawsuit. On December 10, 2014, Cammarata filed a defamation lawsuit against Bill Cosby on behalf of Tamara Green. The suit was later amended to bring the number of plaintiffs in the lawsuit to seven, and to add additional claims for false light and intentional infliction of emotional distress. All women publicly alleged they were drugged and / or sexually assaulted by Cosby. In April 2019, Cosby's insurer, AIG, reached a confidential settlement in the case.

In 1999, Cammarata represented developmentally disabled citizens in litigation against the District of Columbia and its contractors for negligence and civil rights violations, and testified before a D.C. City Council subcommittee about abuse and neglect uncovered during litigation.

In October 2018, Cammarata and co-counsel obtained a court-approved $14.25 million class action settlement on behalf of women who were secretly recorded by Rabbi Bernard “Barry” Freundel while they used a religious bath at the National Capital Mikvah in Washington, D.C.

In 2026, Cammarata, an attorney at Chaikin, Sherman, Cammarata & Siegel, P.C., was selected as a member of the Virginia Lawyers Hall of Fame by Virginia Lawyers Weekly. He was named as part of the Hall of Fame's Class of 2026 and is scheduled to be inducted at a ceremony in Richmond, Virginia, on April 30, 2026.
