= Linda Tripp =

American civil servant (1949–2020)

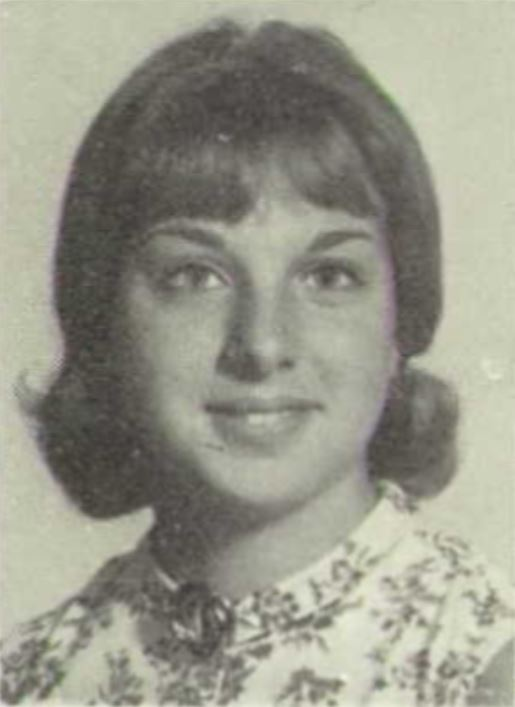
- 1965 yearbook photo
- Born: Linda Rose Carotenuto; November 24, 1949; Jersey City, New Jersey, U.S.
- Died: April 8, 2020 (aged 70)
- Education: Hanover Park High School
- Occupations: Civil servant, small business owner
- Known for: Role in Clinton–Lewinsky scandal
- Spouses: Bruce M. Tripp (m. 1971; div. 1990) Dieter Rausch (m. 2004)
- Children: 2

Linda Rose Tripp (née Carotenuto; November 24, 1949 – April 8, 2020) was an American civil servant who played a prominent role in the Clinton–Lewinsky scandal of 1998. Tripp's action in illegally and secretly recording Monica Lewinsky's confidential phone calls about her relationship with President Bill Clinton caused a sensation with their links to the earlier Clinton v. Jones lawsuit and with the disclosing of intimate details. Tripp maintained that her motives were purely patriotic, and she avoided a wiretap charge by agreeing to hand over the tapes.

She later claimed that her firing from the Pentagon at the end of the Clinton administration was vindictive, but the administration called it standard procedure for a political appointee. From 2002, Tripp and her husband, Dieter Rausch, owned and ran a year-round holiday store, The Christmas Sleigh, in Middleburg, Virginia.

== Early life and career ==
Tripp was born Linda Rose Carotenuto in Jersey City, New Jersey. She was the daughter of Albert Carotenuto, an Italian-American high school math and science teacher, and his wife, Inge Beckwith, a German woman whom he had met while he was an American soldier stationed in Germany. They divorced in 1968, after he had an affair with a fellow teacher and Linda severed all ties to him afterwards. Raised in the Whippany section of Hanover Township, she graduated from Hanover Park High School in East Hanover, New Jersey in 1968. She later worked as a secretary in Army Intelligence at Fort Meade, Maryland. In 1971, she married Bruce Tripp, a military officer with whom she had a son and a daughter. They divorced amicably in 1990.

A White House employee in the George H. W. Bush administration, she kept her job when Bill Clinton became president in 1993. Later, she was moved to a position in the White House Counsel's office under Bernard Nussbaum and his deputy Vince Foster, and Tripp was the last person to see Vince Foster alive shortly before his suicide on July 20, 1993. During the summer of 1994, senior White House aides wanted Tripp removed from the White House and transferred her to the public affairs office in the Pentagon, which raised her salary by $20,000.

== Involvement in Clinton impeachment scandal ==
Tripp became a close confidante of Monica Lewinsky, another former White House employee, while both were working in the Pentagon's public affairs office. According to Tripp, who was about 24 years older than Lewinsky, they had known each other for a year and a half before the scandal began to reach its critical stage. After Lewinsky revealed to Tripp that she had been in a physical relationship with Clinton, Tripp, acting on the advice of the literary agent Lucianne Goldberg, began secretly recording phone conversations with Lewinsky and encouraging Lewinsky to document details of her relationship with the president.

Michael Isikoff from Newsweek reported that, in August 1997, Tripp said that she had encountered Kathleen Willey coming out of the Oval Office "disheveled" and that "her face red and her lipstick was off." Willey alleged that Clinton groped her. Clinton's lawyer Robert S. Bennett said in the Newsweek article, "Linda Tripp is not to be believed."

In January 1998, Tripp gave the tapes to Independent Counsel Kenneth Starr in exchange for immunity from prosecution. Tripp disclosed to Starr that she was aware of the relationship between Lewinsky and Clinton, that Lewinsky had submitted a false affidavit denying the relationship to the federal court in Arkansas in the Clinton v. Jones lawsuit, and that Lewinsky had attempted to suborn Tripp's perjury in that suit to conceal what she knew of the Clinton–Lewinsky relationship and of Kathleen Willey from the federal court. As Tripp explained, she was being solicited to commit a crime to conceal evidence in the Jones civil rights case. Jones' lawsuit, initially filed in April 1994 through her attorneys Joseph Cammarata and Gilbert K. Davis, eventually resulted in the landmark US Supreme Court decision in Clinton v. Jones that held that sitting US presidents do not have immunity against civil lawsuits for acts done before they take office that are unrelated to the office.

Tripp also informed Starr of the existence of a navy blue dress that Lewinsky owned that was soiled with Clinton's semen. During their friendship, Lewinsky had shown the dress to Tripp and said she intended to have it dry-cleaned. Tripp convinced her not to do so. Based on Tripp's tapes, Starr obtained approval from Attorney General Janet Reno and the special court overseeing the independent counsel to expand Starr's investigation into the Clinton–Lewinsky relationship, look for potential incidents of perjury, and investigate Lewinsky for perjury and suborning perjury as a witness in the lawsuit that Paula Jones had brought against Clinton. Eventually, both Clinton and Lewinsky had to appear before a grand jury to answer questions, but Clinton appeared via closed-circuit television. At the conclusion of Lewinsky's interrogation, the jurors offered Lewinsky the chance to offer any last words. She said, "I hate Linda Tripp."

=== Indictment by Maryland ===
Tripp was a resident of Hickory Ridge, while she made her surreptitious recordings of the conversations with Lewinsky, and 49 Democrats in the Maryland Legislature signed a letter to the state prosecutor to demand for Tripp to be prosecuted under Maryland's wiretap law. Before the trial, the state court ruled that because of the immunity agreements that the independent counsel's office had entered with Tripp, Lewinsky, and others, a substantial amount of the evidence that the prosecution had intended to use was inadmissible.

At a pre-trial hearing, the prosecution called Lewinsky as a witness to try to establish if her testimony against Tripp was untainted by the independent counsel's investigation. However, the Maryland state court ruled that Lewinsky, who "admitted that she lied under oath in a federal proceeding and has stated that lying has been a part of her life," was not credible and that Lewinsky's proposed testimony against Tripp was "bathed in impermissible taint." As a result, all charges against Tripp were dismissed on May 26, 2000, when the prosecution decided not to proceed with the trial of the case.

=== Arrest record controversy ===
Tripp had been arrested in 1969 when she was 19 years old in Greenwood Lake, New York, on charges of stealing $263 in cash as well as a wristwatch worth about $600. The charges were dismissed before they could come to trial. Years later, Tripp answered "no" to the question "Have you ever been either charged or arrested for a crime?" on her form for a US Department of Defense security clearance. In March 1998, shortly before Tripp was scheduled to appear before the grand jury in the Lewinsky investigation, Assistant Secretary of Defense for Public Affairs Kenneth Bacon and his deputy, Clifford Bernath, leaked how Tripp had answered that question to Jane Mayer of The New Yorker. The Department of Defense then leaked other confidential information from Tripp's personnel and security files to the news media. The Department of Defense inspector general investigated the leaks and found that Bacon and Bernath had violated the Privacy Act of 1974. The US Department of Defense inspector general concluded that both Bacon and Bernath should have known that the release of information from Tripp's security file was improper.

=== Termination from government employment ===
On January 19, 2001, the last full day of the Clinton administration, Tripp was fired from her job in the Pentagon. She claimed that the firing was vindictive, but the Clinton administration said that all political appointees such as Tripp are normally asked to submit their resignation when a new administration takes over. Those who refuse to do so may be fired.

=== Lawsuit and settlement ===
Tripp sued the US Department of Defense and the US Department of Justice for releasing information from her security file and employment file to the news media in violation of the Privacy Act of 1974. On November 3, 2003, Tripp reached a settlement with the federal government. The settlement included a one-time payment of more than $595,000; a retroactive promotion; and retroactive pay at the highest salary for 1998, 1999, and 2000. She also received a pension and was cleared to work for the federal government again. Her rights to remain part of a class action against the government were preserved.

== Later years ==
In the aftermath of the Clinton-Lewinsky scandal, Tripp has been described as "one of the most hated women in America". Tripp married the German architect Dieter Rausch in 2004. The couple lived in Middleburg, Virginia, where they owned and operated a German winter-themed holiday store, called the Christmas Sleigh.

In an appearance with Larry King on Larry King Live on December 1, 2003, Tripp talked about living with breast cancer. On the subject of her successful invasion of privacy lawsuit against the federal government, Tripp said she actually came out behind financially because of attorneys' fees and the derailment of her government career. She also said her violations of Lewinsky's privacy and the Clinton administration's violations of her privacy were not equivalent, as the Clinton administration's leaking of her employment history was illegal. She noted that although her wiretapping was also illegal, she was able to avoid prosecution for such by accepting immunity in exchange for her testimony.

In 2018, Tripp said that "she was the victim of 'a real high-tech lynching'" (referencing a statement by Clarence Thomas made in 1991). Tripp died after a brief battle with pancreatic cancer at the age of 70 on April 8, 2020. Later in December 2020, Tripp's memoir, A Basket of Deplorables: What I Saw Inside the Clinton White House, was posthumously published.

== Portrayals ==
Tripp was portrayed by John Goodman in recurring Saturday Night Live sketches. Tripp had mixed feelings about the impression, saying she was amused by most of the sketches, but mentioning that at least one had hurt her feelings.

Tripp was portrayed by Sarah Paulson in the television series Impeachment: American Crime Story, which premiered on September 7, 2021, on FX.
