= Robert S. Bennett =

American lawyer (1939–2023)

- Born: Robert Stephen Bennett; August 2, 1939; New York City, U.S.
- Died: September 10, 2023 (aged 84); Washington, D.C., U.S.
- Education: Georgetown University (BA, LLB); Harvard University (LLM)
- Relatives: William Bennett (brother)

Robert Stephen Bennett (August 2, 1939 – September 10, 2023) was an American attorney. He is best known for having represented President Bill Clinton during the Clinton–Lewinsky scandal.

== Early life and education ==
Robert Stephen Bennett was born on August 2, 1939, in Brooklyn, New York. He graduated from Brooklyn Preparatory School in 1957. He received his B.A. from Georgetown University in 1961, where he was a member of the Philodemic Society, his LL.B. from Georgetown in 1964, and his LL.M from Harvard Law School in 1965.

== Career ==
From 1965 to 1967, he served as a clerk for Howard Francis Corcoran, a judge of the U.S. District Court for the District of Columbia. After graduating from law school, Bennett served as assistant U.S. attorney for the District of Columbia. He then went on to Hogan & Hartson, where he worked in the litigation department. He then became a partner with the firm Skadden in Washington, D.C. In September 2009, Bennett announced that he would be returning to Hogan & Hartson. On January 20, 2012 Bennett confirmed that he would represent Megaupload, but he withdrew two days later due to a conflict of interest with another client.

Bennett represented Judith Miller in the Plame affair grand jury investigation case, Caspar Weinberger during the Iran–Contra affair, Clark Clifford in the Bank of Credit and Commerce International (BCCI) scandal, and Paul Wolfowitz in the World Bank Scandal. He served as special counsel for the United States Senate Ethics Committee's 1989–1991 investigation of the Keating Five. In 2008, Bennett was hired by John McCain to defend allegations by The New York Times of an improper relationship with a Washington lobbyist.

Bennett served as a member of the National Review Board for the Protection of Children & Young People, created by the United States Conference of Catholic Bishops, from 2002 to 2004. He was the older brother of William Bennett, former United States secretary of education and director of the Office of National Drug Control Policy. He is the author of In The Ring: The Trials of a Washington Lawyer, published in 2008.

Bennett is portrayed by Christopher McDonald in the 2021 miniseries Impeachment: American Crime Story.

== Death ==
Robert S. Bennett died of kidney failure at his home in Washington, D.C., on September 10, 2023, at the age of 84.
