= Paula Jones =

American civil servant (born 1966)

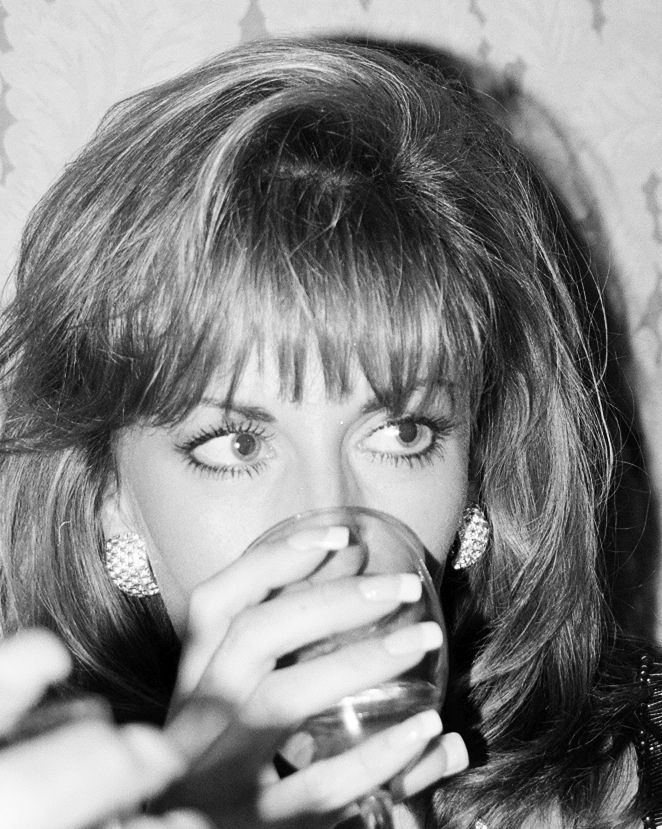
- Jones at the White House Correspondents Dinner, 1998
- Born: Paula Rosalee Corbin; September 17, 1966 (age 60); Lonoke, Arkansas, U.S.
- Known for: Clinton v. Jones
- Spouses: Steve Jones (m. 1991; div. 1999) Steven McFadden (m. 2001)

Paula Corbin Jones (born Paula Rosalee Corbin; September 17, 1966) is an American civil servant. A former Arkansas state employee, Jones sued United States president Bill Clinton for sexual harassment in 1994. In the initial lawsuit, Jones accused Clinton of sexual harassment at the Excelsior Hotel in Little Rock, Arkansas, on May 8, 1991. Following a series of civil suits and appeals through the U.S. District Court and the U.S. Court of Appeals from May 1994 to January 1996, Clinton v. Jones eventually reached the United States Supreme Court on May 27, 1997. The case was later settled on November 13, 1998.

The Paula Jones case provided the impetus for Independent Counsel Ken Starr to broaden his ongoing investigation into Clinton's pre-presidency financial dealings with the Whitewater Land Company, and resulted in Clinton's impeachment in the House of Representatives and subsequent acquittal by the Senate on February 12, 1999. Specifically, Clinton was asked under oath about Monica Lewinsky in the Jones suit, denied having ever had sexual relations with her, and was accused of perjury after evidence of sexual contact was exposed. The Jones lawsuit also led to a landmark legal precedent by the U.S. Supreme Court which ruled that a sitting U.S. president is not exempt from civil litigation for acts committed outside of public office.

Jones's suit was dismissed as lacking legal merit prior to Clinton's impeachment and the exposure of the Lewinsky affair. But in August 1998, Clinton's relationship with Lewinsky, and compelling evidence that he had lied about it under oath in the Jones suit, was brought to light. At that point Jones appealed the ruling, and her appeal gained traction following Clinton's admission to having an affair with Lewinsky in August 1998.

On appeal, Clinton agreed to an out-of-court settlement, paying Jones and her lawyers $850,000 to drop the suit. Clinton's lawyer said that the President made the settlement only so he could end the lawsuit for good and move on with his life. Jones and her lawyers said that the payment was evidence of Clinton's guilt.

Jones continues to maintain that Clinton sexually harassed her. Clinton continues to deny it.

== Early life ==
Jones was born in Lonoke, Arkansas. She was the daughter of a minister in the Church of the Nazarene and raised within that congregation.

Jones graduated from a high school in Carlisle, Arkansas, in 1984. She briefly attended a secretarial school in Little Rock, Arkansas. Living in Little Rock, she met her husband, Steve Jones, in 1989. She worked a number of jobs before joining the Arkansas Industrial Development Commission (AIDC) in March 1991.

== Clinton v. Jones ==
=== Background ===
In a declaration sworn under penalty of felony, Jones alleged that, on May 8, 1991, while working on official business in her capacity as a state employee of the AIDC, she attended the Annual Governor's Quality Conference at the Excelsior Hotel in Little Rock. Jones alleged she was asked by an Arkansas State Police Trooper to report to Arkansas Governor Clinton's hotel room in the Excelsior Hotel (later the Little Rock Marriott), where Clinton propositioned and exposed himself to her. She claimed she kept quiet about the incident until 1994, when a David Brock story in The American Spectator magazine printed an account. Jones filed a sexual harassment suit against Clinton on May 6, 1994, two days before the expiration of the three-year statute of limitations, and sought $750,000 in damages.

=== Initial lawsuit ===
Jones was initially represented by Gilbert Davis and Joseph Cammarata, two Washington, D.C.–area lawyers. Susan Carpenter-McMillan, a California conservative commentator, became her press spokesperson. Carpenter-McMillan wasted no time bringing the issue to the press, calling Clinton "un-American", a "liar", and a "philanderer" on Meet the Press, Crossfire, Equal Time, Larry King Live, Today, The Geraldo Rivera Show, Burden of Proof, Hannity & Colmes, Talkback Live, and other shows. "I do not respect a man who cheats on his wife, and exposes his penis to a stranger," she said.

Judge Susan Webber Wright granted President Clinton's motion for summary judgment, ruling that Jones could not demonstrate that she had suffered any damages. As to the claim of intentional infliction of emotional distress, Wright ruled that Jones failed to show that Clinton's actions constituted "outrageous conduct" as required of the tort, alongside not showing proof of damages caused by distress. Jones appealed the dismissal to the United States Court of Appeals for the Eighth Circuit, where, at oral argument, two of the three judges on the panel appeared sympathetic to her arguments. Clinton and his defense team then challenged Jones' right to bring a civil lawsuit against a sitting president for an incident that occurred before the defendant's becoming president. The Clinton defense team took the position that the trial should be delayed until the president was no longer in office because the job of the president is unique and does not allow him to take time away from it to deal with a private civil lawsuit. The case went through the courts, eventually reaching the Supreme Court. On May 27, 1997, the Court unanimously ruled against Clinton, and allowed the lawsuit to proceed. Clinton dismissed Jones' story and agreed to move on with the lawsuit.

On August 29, 1997, Jones' attorneys Davis and Cammarata asked to resign from the case, believing the settlement offer they had secured, which Jones refused, was the appropriate way to end the case. Jones had reportedly told her lawyers she wanted an apology from Clinton, in addition to a settlement. In September, Judge Wright accepted their request.

Jones was then represented by the Rutherford Institute, a conservative legal organization, and by a Dallas law firm. Carpenter-McMillan continued to serve as Jones' spokesperson. In December 1997, Jones reduced the damages sought in her suit against Clinton to $525,000 and agreed to remove Clinton's co-defendant and former bodyguard, Danny Ferguson, from the suit.

On April 1, 1998, before the case could reach trial, Judge Wright granted Clinton's motion for dismissal, ruling that Jones could not show that she had suffered any damages. Jones soon appealed the dismissal to the United States Court of Appeals for the Eighth Circuit.

=== Conclusion of case ===
On November 13, 1998, Clinton settled with Jones for $850,000 in exchange for her agreement to drop the appeal. However, in the four page settlement deal, Clinton acknowledged no wrongdoing and offered no apology. Robert S. Bennett, Clinton's attorney, still maintained that Jones's claim was baseless and that Clinton only settled to end the lawsuit and move on. In March 1999, Judge Wright ruled that Jones would get only $200,000 from the settlement and that the rest of the money would pay for her legal expenses.

Before the end of the entire litigation, her marriage broke apart.

In April 1999, Judge Wright found Clinton in civil contempt of court for misleading testimony in the Jones case. She ordered Clinton to pay $1,202 to the court and an additional $90,000 to Jones's lawyers for expenses incurred, far less than the $496,000 that the lawyers originally requested.

Wright then referred Clinton's conduct to the Arkansas Bar Association for disciplinary action, and on January 19, 2001, the day before Clinton left the office of president, he entered into an agreement with the Arkansas Bar and independent counsel Robert Ray under which Clinton's license to practice law in Arkansas was suspended for a period of five years. His fine was paid from a fund raised for his legal expenses.

=== Penthouse magazine ===
In December 1994, federal judge Peter K. Leisure ordered Penthouse magazine not to distribute semi-nude photographs of Jones that had been taken by her ex-boyfriend Mike Turner. Owner Bob Guccione argued that the photos counted under "illustrations of newsworthy articles" and called the order prohibiting distribution of the magazine an instance of prior restraint, a position reflected by several law professors; he also said the issue was already out in the hands of distributors. This temporary restraining order was lifted two days later. She later posed for photos illustrating an article, "The Perils of Paula Jones", in the December 2000 issue, citing the pressures of a large tax bill and two young sons to support.

=== Lewinsky scandal connection ===
Jones's lawyers decided to show to the court a pattern of behavior by Clinton that involved his allegedly repeatedly becoming sexually involved with state or government employees. Jones's lawyers therefore subpoenaed women they suspected Clinton had had affairs with, including Arkansas Appeal Tribunal employee Gennifer Flowers, as well as White House employee Monica Lewinsky. In his deposition for the Jones lawsuit, Clinton denied having "sexual relations" with Monica Lewinsky. Based on testimony provided by Linda Tripp, which identified the existence of a blue dress with Clinton's semen on it, Kenneth Starr concluded that Clinton's sworn testimony was false and perjurious.

During the deposition in the Jones case, Clinton was asked, "Have you ever had sexual relations with Monica Lewinsky, as that term is defined in Deposition Exhibit 1, as modified by the Court?" The judge ordered that Clinton be given an opportunity to review the definition. It said that "a person engages in sexual relations when the person knowingly engages in or causes contact with the genitalia, anus, groin, breast, inner thigh, or buttocks of any person with an intent to arouse or gratify the sexual desire of any person". Clinton flatly denied having sexual relations with Lewinsky. Later, at the Starr Grand Jury, Clinton stated that he believed the definition of sexual relations agreed upon for the Jones deposition excluded him receiving oral sex.

It was upon the basis of this statement that the House of Representatives voted to impeach Clinton on December 19, 1998, on charges of perjury and obstruction of justice. Clinton was subsequently tried before the Senate and acquitted of both charges on February 12, 1999.

== Politics ==
In February 2016, Jones endorsed Donald Trump for the 2016 United States presidential election. That same week, she attended a rally for Trump held in Little Rock, Arkansas, where she asked for a selfie with him.

In October 2016, Jones joined Trump for a press conference before the second 2016 Presidential Debate to air grievances against Hillary and Bill Clinton. The conference also included Juanita Broaddrick and Kathleen Willey, who had also accused Bill Clinton of sexual misconduct.

== In popular culture ==
Jones is portrayed by Annaleigh Ashford in the third season of the series American Crime Story.

== See also ==
- Bill Clinton sexual misconduct allegations
- Celebrity Boxing on which Jones appeared
