= Baylor University scandal =

Baylor University scandal may refer to:

- Baylor University basketball scandal, a scandal which broke out after the murder of men's basketball player Patrick Dennehy at Baylor University
- Baylor University sexual assault scandal, a sexual assault scandal centering around football players at Baylor University
