= Baylor Bears =

Intercollegiate sports teams of Baylor University

Coordinates: 31.54472°N 97.11917°W

- University: Baylor University
- Nickname: Bears
- NCAA: Division I (FBS)
- Conference: Big 12 (primary)
- Athletic director: Doug McNamee
- Location: Waco, Texas
- Varsity teams: 18 (7 men's, 10 women's, 1 co-ed)
- Football stadium: McLane Stadium
- Basketball arena: Foster Pavilion
- Baseball stadium: Baylor Ballpark
- Softball stadium: Getterman Stadium
- Soccer stadium: Betty Lou Mays Soccer Field
- Tennis venue: Hurd Tennis Center; Hawkins Indoor Tennis Center
- Colors: Green and gold
- Mascot: Indy and Belle (live); Bruiser and Marigold (costumed)
- Website: baylorbears.com

Big 12 logo in Baylor’s colors

The Baylor Bears are the athletic teams that represent Baylor University. The teams participate in Division I of the National Collegiate Athletic Association (NCAA) as one of only three private school members of the Big 12 Conference. Prior to joining the Big 12, Baylor was a member of the Southwest Conference from their charter creation in 1914 until its dissolution in 1996. Baylor is also a founding member of the Big 12 Conference.

== Sports sponsored ==
Men's sports	Women's sports
Baseball	Acrobatics and tumbling
Basketball	Basketball
Cross country	Cross country
Football	Equestrian
Golf	Golf
Tennis	Soccer
Track and field^{1}	Softball
	Tennis
	Track and field^{1}
	Volleyball
^{1} – includes both indoor and outdoor

During the 2011–2012 season, Baylor set an NCAA record for most combined wins in the four major collegiate sports: baseball, men's and women's basketball, and American football.

=== Football ===
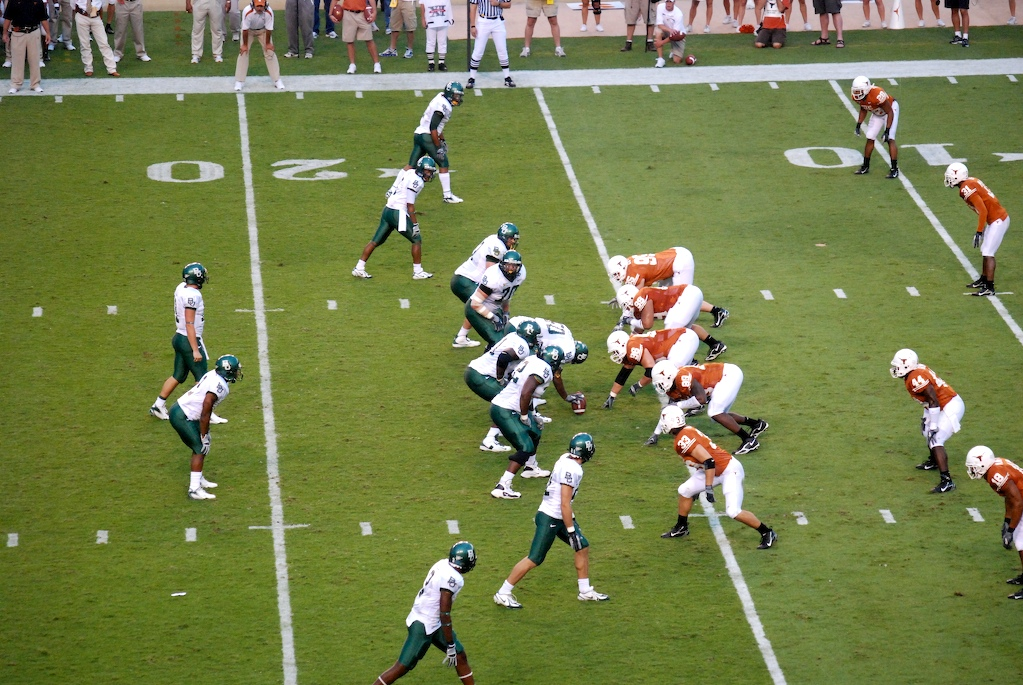
Baylor vs. Texas in 2006

The Baylor American football team opened the new $250 million McLane Stadium, located on the current campus on the banks of the Brazos River, for the 2014 season. The opening of McLane Stadium, with a capacity of 45,000, returned Baylor football games to the campus for the first time since 1935. The Bears played their previous 64 seasons at Floyd Casey Stadium (known as Baylor Stadium until 1988), a 50,000-seat venue located a few miles away from campus.

The Bears compete in the Big 12 Conference are currently playing their 116th year of college football competition during the 2014 season. Over the program's history, the Bears have won or tied for nine conference titles, and have played in 24 bowl games, garnering a record of 13–11. The football program experienced a period of success lasting from the 1970s to the mid-1990s during the tenure of head coach Grant Teaff.

Since becoming a founding member of the Big 12 in 1996, Baylor had its best season coming in 2013 when they finished with an 8–1 conference record and 11–1 overall. In 2004, Baylor defeated its first ranked opponent since 1998, #16 ranked Texas A&M, by a score of 35–34 in overtime on a two-point conversion. In 2005 the team opened 3–0 for the first time since 1996 and finished 5–6; Baylor also won its first Big 12 road game at Iowa State. Also despite a disappointing 4–8 record in 2006, the Bears swept the Big 12 North portion of its conference schedule and won 3 conference games in a season for the first time since joining the Big 12 in 1996. On November 18, 2007, Baylor fired football coach Guy Morriss and announced on November 28, 2007, that former University of Houston head coach Art Briles as the new coach. During the 2010 season, Briles led Baylor to finish with a 7–5 regular season record.

The 2010 season was a breakthrough for the Baylor Bears even though they suffered an early season loss to rival TCU. Baylor earned an invitation to the Texas Bowl in Houston after finishing the regular season with a 7–5 record. The Bears subsequently lost the Texas Bowl to Illinois, however. In the regular season the Bears victories included Big 12 conference wins over Kansas and Kansas St, as well as road wins over Colorado and Texas.

Building on their 2010 winning season, the 2011 Baylor Bears went on to a 9–3 (6–3 Big XII) regular season, finishing with five straight wins including wins against #5 Oklahoma, #25 Texas Tech, and #22 Texas. These wins helped place Robert Griffin III at the top of the Heisman Trophy voting; he became the first Baylor player to win the award and the first Baylor player since Don Trull in 1963 to factor significantly in the voting. The Bears celebrated their successful season with a 2nd consecutive bowl appearance by being selected for the Valero Alamo Bowl in San Antonio. The Bears went on to beat the Washington Huskies 67–56, finishing the 2011 season with a 10–3 record and ranked #19 by the BCS & Coaches Poll.

During the 2012 season, Baylor shocked the college football world by soundly beating #1 Kansas State 52–24 in Waco. (Kansas State had dropped its two previous meetings in Waco 47–42 in 2010 and 17–3 in 2006.) A 12-yard Florence touchdown rush in the first quarter gave Baylor a 14–7 lead which was never relinquished. The Baylor defense highlighted the game with a stout goal-line stand in the 4th quarter and intercepted Heisman hopeful Collin Klein three times, the last in the endzone to set up an 80-yard touchdown run by Lache Seastrunk. The victory over Kansas State represented the program's first and only win to date over a #1 ranked team and sparked a 3-game win streak for Baylor (with a 52–45 overtime victory over Texas Tech in Cowboys Stadium and a 41–34 victory in Waco over #23 Oklahoma State). The conclusion of Baylor's 8–5 2012 campaign marked the first time since 1949–51 that the Bears have enjoyed three consecutive seasons with 7+ wins. On December 2, Baylor accepted a berth in the Holiday Bowl, sending the Bears to a third consecutive bowl for the first time in program history. Baylor easily defeated the #17-ranked UCLA Bruins in the Holiday Bowl on December 27, 2012, by a final margin of 49–26 after jumping out to a 21–0 lead early in the 2nd quarter. Lache Seastrunk (RB) and Chris McAllister (DE) were named Offensive Player and Defensive Player of the game respectively. Coach Art Briles has led the Bears to a record of 11–1 in November and December the past 2 seasons which includes 2 bowl wins.

In May 2016, Head Coach Art Briles, Athletic Director Ian McCaw, and University President Ken Starr were fired due to the Baylor University sexual assault investigation. Jim Grobe took over as interim head coach for Baylor and led them to a 6–6 record and a victory in the Cactus Bowl over Boise State. In December 2016 former Temple coach Matt Rhule, was hired as the head Baylor football coach and given a 7-year contract. Rhule subsequently replaced all of the prior football coaches and support staff and completed the hiring process in February 2017.

=== Baseball ===
Baylor Bears baseball has had a total of 4 baseball coaches in the past 50+ years, Mickey Sullivan served for 21 years prior to Steve Smith and Texas Sports Hall of Famer Dutch Schroeder for 12 seasons before Sullivan. Coincidentally, Sullivan and Smith both coached for exactly 21 seasons. Led by Steve Smith, Baylor's baseball team achieved success rarely seen before his arrival. In the 14 seasons from 1998 to 2012, Coach Smith led the team to 12 NCAA Regional appearances (1998, 1999, 2000, 2001, 2002, 2003, 2005, 2006, 2007, 2009, 2010, 2012), 4 NCAA Super Regional appearances (1999, 2003, 2005, 2012), 3 regular season conference titles (2000, 2005, 2012) and a College World Series appearance (2005). The Bears hosted an NCAA Regional in 1999, 2000, 2005, and 2012 in addition to hosting an NCAA Super Regional in 1999, 2005, and 2012. Since the inception of the Big 12 Conference, Baylor is one of only two teams (Baylor & Oklahoma) to have qualified for the Big 12 Tournament every year. In May 2015, Steve Smith was not retained as head coach, he ended his tenure at Baylor with a 744–523–1 record.

In June 2015 Baylor Bears baseball announced the hiring of former Pepperdine head baseball coach Steve Rodriguez. Following a 24–29 record in the 2016 season, Coach Rodriguez and the Baylor baseball team ended the 2017 season with a record of 34–23, good for 4th overall in the Big 12 and an NCAA postseason appearance.

=== Women's basketball ===
The Baylor Bears, then known as Lady Bears, won the NCAA Women's Division I Basketball Championship in 2005. Coached by Kim Mulkey, the Lady Bears defeated the Spartans of Michigan State University 84–62. Mulkey became the first women's coach and only the third coach in history to win an NCAA Division I basketball championship as both a player and a coach, joining Dean Smith and Bob Knight. In 8 of her 9 years as head coach, Mulkey has guided the Lady Bears to the NCAA Tournament. In 2010, Mulkey returned the Lady Bears to the Final Four, where they lost in the national semifinals to eventual champion UConn. In 2011, the Lady Bears won the Big 12 regular season and tournament titles along with making it all the way to the Elite Eight before being knocked out of the tournament by rival and eventual national champion Texas A&M. In 2012, they finished a perfect 40–0, became the first men's or women's college basketball team to finish 40–0, and won their second national NCAA Women's Division I Basketball Championship. In 2013, the Lady Bears won both the Big 12 regular season and tournament titles and made it to the Sweet Sixteen in the NCAA tournament before falling to Louisville in one of the biggest upsets in the history of the women's tournament. In 2019, they won the NCAA Division I women's basketball tournament. In April 2021, after over two decades at the helm, Mulkey left Baylor to coach LSU. Basketball was one of the last three Baylor women's sports to abandon the "Lady" moniker, doing so in advance of the 2021–22 season.

=== Men's basketball ===
The men's basketball program was plagued by a scandal in 2003. Patrick Dennehy, a player for the team, was murdered by Carlton Dotson, a former Baylor player who had been kicked off the team. Then-coach Dave Bliss was forced to resign amidst allegations that he had made financial payments to four players while also making public statements that had characterized Dennehy as a drug dealer. The school placed itself on probation, limited itself to 7 scholarships for two years, and imposed a post-season ban for the 2004–05 academic year. Additionally, the NCAA further punished the team by initiating a non-conference ban for the 2005–2006 season and extending the probationary period during which the school would have limited recruiting privileges.

The 2005 Bears were hindered by only having 7 scholarship players and recorded only one win in conference play. In spite of these challenges, head coach Scott Drew was able to put together a 2005 signing class ranked No. 7 nationally by HoopScoop. The 2006 Bears included Aaron Bruce, the highest scoring freshman in the NCAA in 2005, and Mamadou Diene, rated one of the top 10 centers for the 2007 NBA draft. The program's recovery culminated in 3 straight postseason appearances: an at-large NCAA Men's Tournament berth in March 2008, an NIT championship game appearance in March 2009, and a trip to the NCAA tournament's Elite Eight in March 2010. Baylor would make another trip to the Elite Eight in 2012 before losing to eventual national champion Kentucky. The Bears would follow up their elite eight run by winning the 2013 NIT title after beating Iowa in the final game at Madison Square Garden. The 2021 team defeated Gonzaga 86–70 to win the NCAA tournament.

Baylor men's teams won five conference championships in the former Southwest Conference (1932, 1946, 1948, 1949, 1950) and one regular season championship in the Big 12 Conference (2021). The Bears reached the NCAA tournament for the first time in 1946 and the Final Four in 1948, 1950 and 2021. The 1948 team advanced to play the Kentucky Wildcats for the NCAA championship, but fell 58–42 to Adolph Rupp's first national championship team.

Both the men and women call the Foster Pavilion home, which was built in 2024. Previously they played in the Ferrell Center. A non-exhaustive list of BU players who played in the NBA include Vinnie Johnson, David Wesley, Michael Williams, Terry Teagle, and Brian Skinner. Ekpe Udoh was selected with the #6 pick in the 2010 NBA Draft by the Golden State Warriors.

=== Tennis ===
In 2004, the Bears men's tennis team won the NCAA Division I Men's Tennis Championship, Baylor University's first NCAA national team title. The team made it back to the Championship game in 2005 but lost the national title match to UCLA. The team won 9 straight conference regular season championships dating from 2000 to 2009. The Baylor tennis team has the most conference titles and best winning percentage of any Big 12 tennis team.

=== Track and field ===
Baylor's heralded track and field team has produced nine Olympic gold medals, 36 NCAA championships, and 606 All-Americas performances. A majority of the All-Americans coming under the 42-year tenure of head coach Clyde Hart. A marquee element of the track program has been its men's 4 × 400 relay team, which has sent teams to the NCAA finals in each of the past 28 years. Baylor track and field has also produced three Olympic gold medalists: Michael Johnson, Jeremy Wariner and Darold Williamson. Baylor grads won gold in the 400 meter dash at three consecutive Olympics (Johnson in '96 and '00, then Wariner in '04). In 2005, Clyde Hart became Director of Track & Field, and Todd Harbour took over as head coach of Baylor's track and field and cross country squads.

=== Soccer ===
Baylor women's soccer plays at Betty Lou Mays Field. Established in 1996 under coach Randy Waldrum, the team has won four Big 12 season titles, winning the regular season in 1998 and Big 12 tournament titles in 2012, 2017, and 2018. They made the Elite 8 in the NCAA tournament in 2017 and 2018. Baylor women's soccer was coached by husband and wife Paul and Marci Jobson for 14 seasons, starting in 2008 when Marci became head coach and Paul associate head coach, then with the two as co-head coaches in 2013 and 2014, and finally with Paul as sole head coach until the end of 2021, when the Jobsons stepped away from coaching. Paul finished as Baylor's all-time winningest coach, with a record of 97–57–26, including 40–28–12 against Big 12 opponents. The team is now coached by Michelle Lenard.

== Notable non varsity sports ==
=== Rugby ===
Baylor University Rugby Football Club plays in Division 1-A in the Allied Rugby Conference, a conference composed mostly of schools from the Big 12 South, against its traditional rivals such as Texas, Texas Tech, and Texas A&M. Baylor won the USA Rugby Collegiate Division II National Championship in 2001. Baylor has had success in various competitions, including winning the 2009 Cowtown Rugby Tournament in Fort Worth, Texas. Baylor Rugby made the State Championship Game in the 2009 season by beating Texas State University to advance to the final, where they lost to Texas Tech University. Baylor again made the State Championship Game in the 2010 season by beating the University of North Texas to advance to the final, where they lost to Rice University.

== Championships ==
=== 2012: "The Year of the Bear" ===
The Year of the Bear (in Baylor parlance, Añodeloso, a takeoff of the popular Diadeloso festival) is the name given to the 2011–2012 year in Baylor Athletics.

The year started out on a potentially ominous note due to the turmoil surrounding the Big 12 Conference after it lost its third member in two years (by the end of the year, it would lose a fourth member) and the real potential for the conference to disband. Baylor was not being considered by any major conference as a potential member due to its poor overall football performance as a Big 12 member (the 2010 season was the first year that the program finished at .500 in conference play, and only the second time that it had not finished last or tied for last in its division), along with being a small religious private school.

But the Year of the Bear would start with an upset when the Baylor Bears football team defeated former Southwest Conference rival (and later Big 12 rival) TCU (which was coming off an undefeated season and No. 2 ranking the prior year) 50–48. The win would catapult junior quarterback Robert Griffin III into the Heisman spotlight. The Bears finished the season at 10–3 (at that time, tied for the most wins in school history) and a No. 12 final ranking, with six straight wins to close the season, including another upset along the way – this against then No. 5 Oklahoma, a program it had never defeated in 20 previous tries – and a win in the 2011 Valero Alamo Bowl led by Griffin, who won the 2011 Heisman Trophy and National Player of the Year honors.

While the football team finished strong, the men's and women's basketball teams started strong. The men's team would start with 17 straight wins en route to a 30–8 season (the best in school history), a berth in the NCAA Elite Eight (its second in three seasons) and a No. 10 final ranking. The women's team would win the program's second national title, becoming the first basketball program – men's or women's – to finish 40–0. Center Brittney Griner would win National Player of the Year while coach Kim Mulkey would win National Coach of the Year.

The baseball team would win 49 games (one shy of its all-time best), including a school-record 24-game winning streak. At one point it reached the No. 1 ranking for two weeks (a program first), but it finished in the NCAA Super Regionals and a No. 9 ranking.

Baylor's four major programs (American football, men's and women's basketball, and baseball) would finish with an NCAA record 129 wins during the year (and an overall record of 129–28 for a winning percentage of .822) and Baylor would be the only school to have all four programs ranked at the end of their respective seasons (football No. 12, men's basketball No. 10, women's basketball No. 1 and baseball No. 9). The football and men's & women's basketball programs also set NCAA records with a combined 80 wins between them, including a stretch from November 1, 2011, to January 16, 2012, when the three programs had 40 consecutive wins between them.

The Year of the Bear earned Baylor attention across the nation. Sports reporter Jim Rome (who had derided the program earlier, referring to it as "scrubby little Baylor" among other things) said, "Well, not only do they belong in the Big 12, they're running the Big 12."

=== NCAA team championships ===
Baylor has won 5 NCAA team national championships.

- Men's (2)
  - Tennis (1): 2004
  - Basketball (1): 2021
- Women's (3)
  - Basketball (3): 2005, 2012, 2019
- see also:
  - Big 12 Conference national team titles
  - List of NCAA schools with the most NCAA Division I championships

=== Other national team championships ===
The following national team titles were not bestowed by the NCAA. Both sports in question are currently part of the NCAA Emerging Sports for Women program; equestrian has been included in this program since the 2001–02 school year, with acrobatics & tumbling added effective in 2020–21.

- Women's:
  - Equestrian (Hunter Seat) (1): 2012
- Women's
  - Acrobatics and Tumbling (6): 2015, 2016, 2017, 2018, 2019, 2021

Baylor won its first team NCAA title in 2004 as the men's tennis team defeated UCLA in the championship match. They narrowly lost to UCLA in the 2005 national championship match the following year. Under its former nickname of Lady Bears, Bears women's basketball won the school's next three championships in 2005, 2012 and 2019. During the 2011–2012 season, Baylor set an NCAA record for most combined wins in the four major collegiate sports: baseball, men's and women's basketball, and American football.

- see also:
  - List of NCAA schools with the most Division I national championships

=== National individual championships ===
Baylor has won 39 NCAA individual championships. Appropriately branded "Quartermile U", Baylor has won 20 national titles in the 4 × 400 meter relay

=== Conference championships ===
Baylor has won 123 conference titles, 90 of which are from the Big 12, and the other 33 from the Southwest Conference:

Men's Baseball(9)
- Regular Season: 1923, 1966, 2000, 2005, 2012
- Tournament: 1977, 1978, 1993, 2018

Men's Basketball(7)
- Regular Season: 1932, 1946, 1948, 1949, 1950, 2021, 2022

Fencing(3) (conference competition ended in 1957)
- 1939, 1940, 1941

American Football(10)
- 1915, 1916, 1922, 1924, 1974, 1980, 1994, 2013, 2014, 2021

Men's Golf(5)
- Regular Season:*1957, 1966, 2001
- Tournament: 2018, 2020

Men's Tennis(24)
- Regular Season: 2000, 2002, 2003, 2004, 2005, 2006, 2007, 2008, 2009, 2011, 2013, 2014, 2015, 2021
- Tournament: 2002, 2003, 2004, 2005, 2007, 2008, 2009, 2014, 2019, 2021

Men's Indoor Track and Field(2)
- 1976, 1996

Men's Outdoor Track and Field(3)
- 1960, 1962, 1963

Men's Cross Country(2)
- 1992, 1994

Women's Basketball(24)
- Regular Season: 2005, 2011, 2012, 2013, 2014, 2015, 2016, 2017, 2018, 2019, 2020, 2021, 2022
- Tournament: 2005, 2009, 2011, 2012, 2013, 2014, 2015, 2016, 2018, 2019, 2021

Women's Indoor Track and Field(1)
- 2017

Women's Cross Country(4)
- 1990, 1991, 1992, 1993

Women's Equestrian(4)
- 2010, 2015, 2017, 2019

Women's Golf(1)
- 2015

Women's Soccer(4)
- Regular Season: 1998, 2018
- Tournament: 2012, 2017

Women's Softball(1)
- Regular Season: 2007

Women's Tennis(19)
- Regular Season: 2003, 2005, 2006, 2007, 2008, 2009, 2010, 2011, 2013, 2014, 2015
- Tournament: 2006, 2007, 2008, 2009, 2010, 2011, 2014, 2015

Women's Volleyball(1)
- Regular Season: 2019

== Rivalries ==
=== Rivalry with TCU ===
The TCU–Baylor rivalry originated in 1899, when both schools were located in Waco; the two schools are still only separated by an hour-and-twenty-minute drive on Interstate 35 and both are private, Christian universities. TCU and Baylor had the nation's longest "continuous game" rivalry until the series was temporarily stopped in 1995 upon the SWC's demise and the schools joining different conferences. The rivalry was renewed in 2012 when TCU joined Baylor in the Big 12 Conference. The series remains one of the most prolific rivalries in college football.

=== Rivalry with Texas ===
Baylor and the University of Texas are natural rivals, located only a hundred miles apart in central Texas. Both schools were founding members of the Southwest Conference and have played over 100 games against each other. Texas leads the series 74–26. Baylor's fortunes changed in 2010 as Heisman-trophy winning quarterback Robert Griffin III led the Bears to their first win over Texas since 1997.

=== Rivalry with Texas A&M ===
The Baylor–Texas A&M rivalry was known as the Battle of the Brazos, as the Brazos River runs near both campuses (which are approximately 90 miles apart). The series began in 1899 and was played until 2011, with only a few brief breaks in the 1920s and during World War II. With Texas A&M accepting an invitation to join the Southeast Conference in 2012, the rivalry has been discontinued with no current indication if the rivalry might resume in the future.

== Traditions ==
=== Team colors ===
Baylor's official school colors are green and gold. These colors were picked in 1897 after a group of students, returning to campus on a train after an out of town tournament, looked out the window at the wild Texas spring flowers and remarked that the vivid yellow and green colors made a "lovely combination." When the students returned to Waco, the color combination of "green and gold" was recommended and readily adopted by the student body.

=== Homecoming ===
Baylor University was one of the first universities in the United States to stage a homecoming celebration. The Baylor homecoming event was launched in November 1909 as a way to reconnect Baylor alumni with current students. Thousands of Alumni traveled from all over Texas and throughout the South to take part in the festivities. The first homecoming weekend event included a football game, bonfire, concerts, speeches, a reception, a class reunion, and a pep rally. The Homecoming event is continued every year and the annual tradition is now over 100 years old.

=== Baylor Line ===
The Baylor Line is one of the first aspects of Baylor spirit to which freshmen are introduced. The Baylor Line is made entirely of freshmen and is the core of Baylor spirit and tradition. Students wear a gold football jersey with the number of their graduation year and a nickname on the back. Before each American football game the Baylor Line gathers at one end of Floyd Casey Stadium and waits for the signal to make a 'mad dash' down the field to create a giant human tunnel through which the football team runs through to enter the stadium. After that, students rush the sidelines and stand in an exclusive Baylor Line section behind the opponents' bench where students watch the game, cheer the Bears to another victory, and sometimes heckle the opposing team.

The Baylor Line was organized almost 50 years ago and was an all-male organization until 1993, when women were allowed to join. At its inception, the Baylor Line was a group of freshmen men who lined the front of Baylor's student section for the express purpose of protecting Baylor women from the other teams' fans.

The jersey colors of the Line were originally rotated between Baylor green (in odd numbered years) and Baylor gold (in even numbered years), but in the interest of having a more substantial looking student section the decision was made to use gold every year starting around 1999.

=== Immortal Ten ===
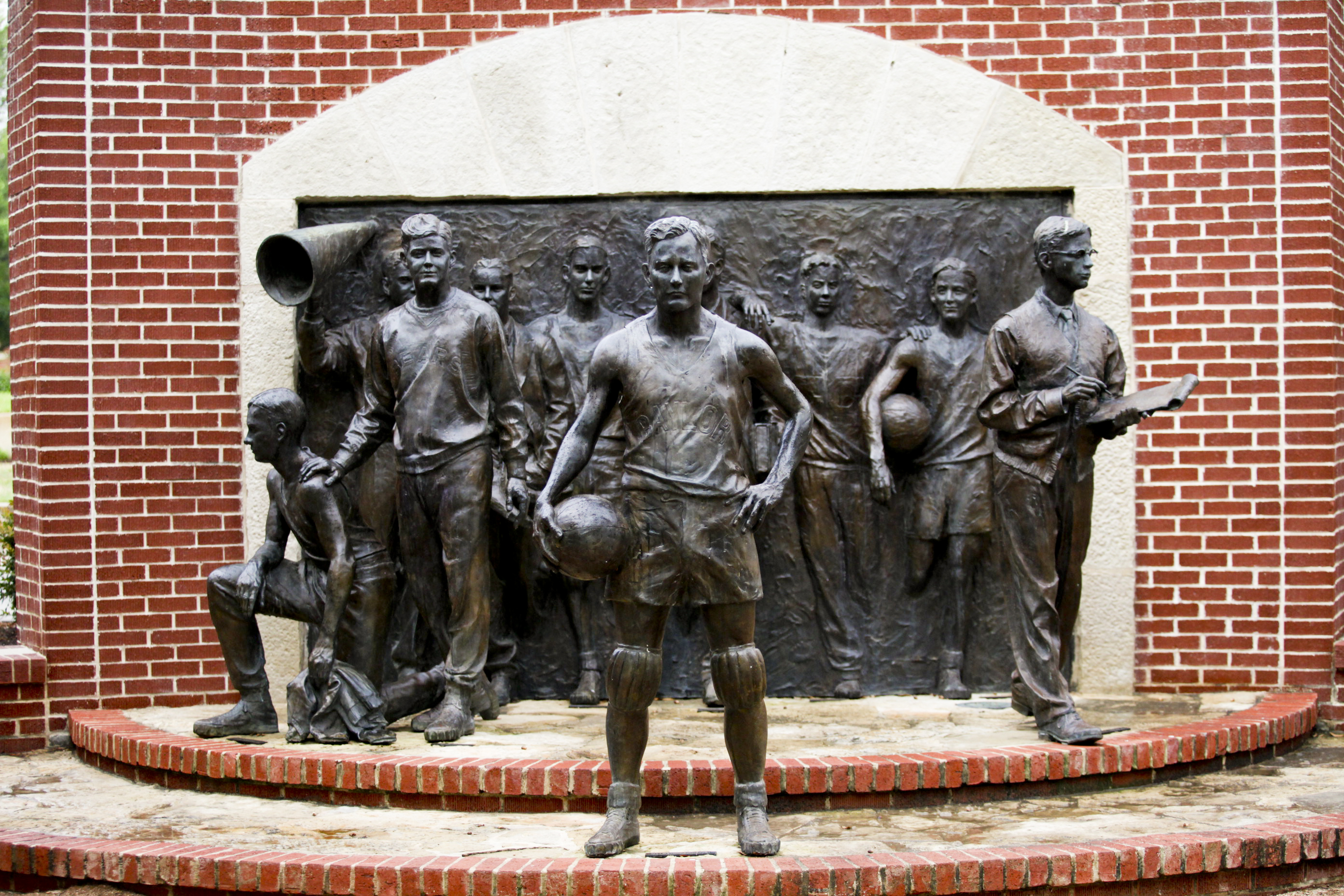
The Immortal Ten Memorial

In January 1927 a bus carrying the Baylor basketball team collided with the Sunshine Special train in Round Rock, Texas. Ten members of the traveling party were killed and many others were injured in the accident. Each year at homecoming the story of the Immortal Ten is told again to the new freshman class at the Freshman Mass Meeting. The names of the ten are called out. In 1996, the senior class provided initial funding to create and place an Immortal Ten statue on campus. Fund raising and discussions about where to place the statues continued off and on over the ensuing years. Finally, on June 22, 2007, the statues, which were sculpted by Bruce R. Greene, were unveiled. The Immortal Ten memorial was officially dedicated during Homecoming on November 2, 2007, in Traditions Square.

=== Alma mater ===
In 1931, Mrs. Enid Markham, wife of music professor Robert Markham, wrote lyrics that were presented in chapel in November and soon sanctioned as the official school song. The "In the Good Old Summer Time" tune was rearranged to fit Mrs. Markham's "Baylor Line" by Baylor Band Director Donald I. Moore. Before kickoff and after each game's conclusion Baylor fans sing the university alma mater 'That Good Old Baylor Line' while holding their "Bear paws" in the air.

=== Fight song ===
Baylor's fight song, "Old Fight!", was written in 1940 after a group of students wrote to various famous musicians asking for their help in creating a fight song for the university. Two Brothers, Fred and Tom Waring, volunteered to help. Together the pair wrote "Bear Down Baylor Bears", this song was then performed by the Pennsylvanians on the Warings' live national NBC radio broadcast ("The Chesterfield Pleasure Time Radio Show") on December 20, 1940. Eventually, two students Dick Baker '50, and Frank Boggs '48, decided to rewrite the song to make it easier for students to sing. The wrote the new song lyrics on a weekend in 1947 and the completed song was introduced outside of old Brooks Hall near Minglewood Bowl that fall.

=== Women's team nickname ===
Baylor had historically used "Lady Bears" as its women's sports nickname, but over time all women's teams dropped "Lady". The last three holdouts were basketball, soccer, and volleyball; all three teams became simply "Bears" effective with the 2021–22 school year.

== Notable athletes and coaches ==
=== Baseball ===
- Pat Combs – Pitcher, first round draft pick for the Philadelphia Phillies, played for the Phillies 1989–1992
- Jake Freeze – Pitcher, Chicago White Sox in 1925
- Jason Jennings – Pitcher, in MLB 2001–2009
- Ted Lyons – Pitcher, Chicago White Sox 1923–1946, member of the National Baseball Hall of Fame
- Max Muncy – Infielder, in MLB 2015–present
- David Murphy – Outfielder, 2003 first round draft pick for the Boston Red Sox; in MLB 2006–2015
- Ken Patterson – Pitcher, in MLB 1988–1994; Chicago White Sox, Chicago Cubs, California Angels; former pitching coach specialist for the Angels
- Scott Ruffcorn – Pitcher, in MLB 1993–1997; Chicago White Sox, Philadelphia Phillies
- Kelly Shoppach – Catcher, in MLB 2005–2013
- Bob Simpson – owner of the Texas Rangers and co-founder of XTO Energy
- Shawn Tolleson – Pitcher, in MLB 2012–2016
- Lee Tunnell – Pitcher, in MLB 1982–1989, for the Pittsburgh Pirates, St. Louis Cardinals, and Minnesota Twins
- Logan Verrett - Pitcher, in MLB 2015–2017, and in KBO League 2018
- Kip Wells – Pitcher, in MLB 1999–2012
- Stephan Martinez Holds record for most times hit by pitch and Hero Captain at Austin Fire Department

=== Men's basketball ===
- Quincy Acy – power forward for the Brooklyn Nets
- Aundrae Branch - "Hot Shot" is a former member of the Harlem Globetrotters.
- Jared Butler – point guard for the Utah Jazz
- Carroll Dawson – former assistant coach and general manager for the Houston Rockets 1980–2007
- Pierre Jackson – point guard for the Texas Legends
- Cory Jefferson – power forward for the Alaska Aces (PBA)
- Vinnie Johnson – former player for the Detroit Pistons (1979–1992); nicknamed "The Microwave" for being able to come off the bench heated up and ready to play
- Perry Jones III – forward for the Iowa Energy
- Dennis Lindsey – General Manager for the Utah Jazz, former Baylor guard (1988–1992)
- Darryl Middleton – professional player for many European teams (won the 2002 Euroleague Cup)
- Quincy Miller – small forward for Maccabi Tel Aviv
- Davion Mitchell – point guard for the Sacramento Kings
- Johnathan Motley - forward for the Dallas Mavericks of the National Basketball Association (NBA) (2017 - ).
- Red Owens – former NBA guard for the Tri-Cities Blackhawks, Anderson Packers and the Milwaukee Hawks (1949–1952)
- Jackie Robinson – won a gold medal as a guard for the 1948 U.S. Olympic basketball team in London
- Terry Teagle – former shooting guard for the Detroit Pistons, Golden State Warriors, Los Angeles Lakers and the Houston Rockets (1982–1995)
- Brian Skinner – former forward-center for most notably the Los Angeles Clippers along with 10 other NBA teams from (1998–2011)
- Ekpe Udoh – forward for the Fenerbahçe Men's Basketball
- Mark Vital – forward on the 2021 national championship team; now a tight end on the practice squad of the Kansas City Chiefs
- Micheal Williams – former point guard for the Detroit Pistons, Phoenix Suns, Charlotte Hornets, Indiana Pacers, Minnesota Timberwolves, and Toronto Raptors
- David Wesley – former point guard for the New Jersey Nets, Boston Celtics, New Orleans Hornets, Houston Rockets and the Cleveland Cavaliers (1992–2007)

=== Women's basketball ===
- Jody Conradt – Legendary women's basketball coach at the University of Texas.
- Brittney Griner – AP college player of the year 2012, and second leading scorer in women's basketball history.
- Sonja Hogg – Head women's basketball coach at Louisiana Tech and Baylor.
- Bernice Mosby – WNBA first-round draft pick (Washington 2007)
- NaLyssa Smith – Current Bears forward; 2021 recipient of the Wade Trophy
- Sophia Young – All-Star forward and 2006 first-round draft pick for the San Antonio Silver Stars of the WNBA

=== American football ===
- Gary Baxter – NFL cornerback and safety for the Baltimore Ravens (2001–04) and Cleveland Browns (2005–06)
- Philip Blake – CFL offensive center for the Montreal Alouettes
- Matt Bryant – NFL placekicker for the Atlanta Falcons
- Cody Carlson – NFL Quarterback taken in the 3rd round of the 1987 NFL draft for the Houston Oilers (1988–94)
- Chance Casey – NFL cornerback for the Oakland Raiders (2013,2014)
- Corey Coleman- NFL wide receiver for the Cleveland Browns
- Cotton Davidson – Played and coached at Baylor, quarterback in the NFL and AFL
- Ahmad Dixon – NFL Safety for the Minnesota Vikings (2014)
- Santana Dotson – Tampa Bay Buccaneers defensive lineman, 1992 NFL Defensive Rookie of the Year, also played for the Green Bay Packers and Washington Redskins (1992–2002)
- Thomas Everett – NFL defensive back with the Pittsburgh Steelers, Dallas Cowboys, and Tampa Bay Buccaneers (1987–95)
- Theron J. Fouts – University of North Texas head coach
- James Francis – NFL linebacker for the Cincinnati Bengals and Washington Redskins (1990–99)
- Malcolm Frank – Canadian Football League defensive back
- Hayden Fry – NCAA Division I-A coach (1962–98)
- Terrance Ganaway – Running back for the St. Louis Rams (2012)
- Lester Gatewood – NFL center for the Green Bay Packers (1943–45)
- Dennis Gentry – NFL RB selected in the 4th round of the 1982 NFL draft by the Chicago Bears (1982–92)
- David Gettis – 2010 NFL draft 198th overall pick by the Carolina Panthers (2010–12)
- Bill Glass – Round 1 draft pick and defensive tackle with the Detroit Lions (1958–61) and the Cleveland Browns (1962–68)
- Demetri Goodson – Cornerback with the Green Bay Packers
- Josh Gordon – Wide receiver, Drafted in the second round of the 2012 supplemental draft by the Cleveland Browns
- Robert Griffin III – Heisman Trophy winning (2011) Baylor quarterback; 2012 NFL draft 2nd overall draft pick by the Washington Redskins
- Greg Hawthorne – NFL running back with the Pittsburgh Steelers and New England Patriots (1979–87)
- Jeff Ireland – Kicker at Baylor and assistant general manager of the New Orleans Saints
- Khari Long – NFL Defensive end for the Kansas City Chiefs (2005) Chicago Bears (2006)
- Gerald McNeil – "The Ice Cube", NFL and USFL wide receiver that played in the 1980s
- Fred Miller – Offensive tackle for the St. Louis Rams (1996–99), Tennessee Titans (2000–04), and the Chicago Bears (2005–08)
- Mike Nelms – All-pro NFL and CFL defensive back
- J. W. Pender – University of North Texas head coach (1913–14)
- Luke Prestridge – Former all-pro NFL punter with the Denver Broncos
- Tevin Reese – Drafted in the 7th round of the 2014 NFL draft
- John B. Reid – University of North Texas head coach
- Cyril Richardson – Offensive guard for the Buffalo Bills (2014–15) and Chicago Bears practice squad
- James Monroe "Jack" Russell – New York Yankees defensive end (1946–50)
- Lloyd Russell – University of North Texas head coach (1942); Baylor Bears baseball head coach (1940–41, 1958–61)
- Lache Seastrunk – Running back for the Winnipeg Blue Bombers
- Daniel Sepulveda – Punter for Pittsburgh Steelers (2007–11); two time Ray Guy Award winner
- Del Shofner – Wide receiver for L.A. Rams (1957–60), New York Giants (1961–67); five-time All-Pro and Pro Bowler
- Mike Singletary – Linebacker for the Chicago Bears (1981–92); head coach of the San Francisco 49ers (2008–10); assistant head coach for the Minnesota Vikings, inducted into the Pro Football Hall of Fame in 1998
- Jack Sisco – University of North Texas head coach
- Jason Smith – Former NFL Offensive tackle, 2nd overall draft pick by the St. Louis Rams in 2009 NFL draft
- Jack Steadman – Former chairman, vice president, president and general manager for the Kansas City Chiefs
- Phil Taylor – Defensive tackle for the Cleveland Browns (2011–14) and Washington Redskins (2017), 21st overall draft pick in 2011 NFL draft
- Don Trull – All American quarterback at Baylor; played six seasons with the AFL Houston Oilers (1964–69)
- J. D. Walton – Former NFL Offensive center for the Denver Broncos (2010–13)
- Danny Watkins – Former Offensive tackle for the Philadelphia Eagles (2011–13), 23rd overall draft pick in 2011 NFL draft
- Jon Weeks – Long Snapper for the Houston Texans
- Terrance Williams – Wide receiver for the Dallas Cowboys
- Kendall Wright – Wide receiver for the Chicago Bears, 20th overall draft pick in 2012 NFL draft
- Bob Woodruff – former Head coach at the University of Florida and former athletic director of the University of Tennessee

=== Tennis ===
- Benjamin Becker – German professional player (defeated Andre Agassi in Agassi's final match in the 2006 U.S. Open)
- Benedikt Dorsch – Professional tennis player on the ATP tour
- John Peers – Professional tennis player on the ATP tour, was eliminated in the quarterfinals of the 2013 US Open Men's Doubles and made it to 3rd round of the 2014 Wimbledon Men's Doubles

=== Track and field ===
- Trayvon Bromell – World Junior Record holder over 100 meters
- Michael Johnson – Winner of five Olympic gold medals and nine-time world champion
- Jeremy Wariner – Winner of gold medals at the 2004 Summer Olympics in Athens, Greece for the individual 400 meter and the 4 × 400 meter
- Darold Williamson – Winner of a gold medal at the 2004 Summer Olympics in Athens, Greece in the 4 × 400 meter
- Reggie Witherspoon – Winner of a gold medal at the 2008 Summer Olympics in Beijing for the 4 × 400 meter along with teammate Jeremy Wariner.

=== Volleyball ===
- Laura Daniela Lloreda – Mexican/Puerto Rican player

=== Golf ===
- Jimmy Walker – PGA Tour major champion, winner of the PGA Championship in 2016

== Athletic directors ==
Tenure	Name	Notes
1903–1904	R. N. Watts	Resigned to become secretary of Austin's Y.M.C.A.
1907–1908	Luther Burleson	
1908–1911	Enoch J. Mills	
1913–1914	Norman C. Paine	Dual-employment as head football coach. Resigned to pursue a Ph.D. in sociology.
1914–1920	Charles Mosley	Dual-employment as head football coach. Resigned.
1920–1926	Frank Bridges	Dual-employment as head football coach. Resigned.
1926–1941	Morley Jennings	Dual-employment as head football coach. Resigned.
1941–1949	Ralph Wolf	Resigned after argument with head football coach Bob Woodruff.
1950–1958	George Sauer	Dual-employment as head football coach until 1955. Resigned.
1959–1968	John Bridgers	Dual-employment as head football coach. Contract not renewed.
1968–1971	Bill Henderson	Retired.
1971–1980	Jack Patterson	Retired.
1980–1992	Bill Menefee	Retired.
1992–1993	Grant Teaff	Resigned to take AFCA executive director post followed revelation of academic cheating among coach Darrel Johnson's basketball team.
1993–1996	Richard "Dick" Ellis	Resigned, citing the new presidency of Robert B. Sloan.
1996–2003	Tom Stanton	Resigned in response to the Baylor University basketball scandal.
2003–2016	Ian McCaw	Resigned on May 30, 2016
2016	Todd Patulski	Served as interim athletic director from June to August 2016
2016–2025	Mack Rhoades	Resigned on November 20, 2025
2025-Present	Doug McNamee	

== Mascots ==
=== Live mascots ===
Big Joe, a live mascot for the university, c. 1941

The mascots of Baylor University are two live black bears named Judge Indy and Judge Belle. American black bears roamed the majority of Texas in considerable abundance during Baylor's founding in 1845, and bears could still be found throughout many areas of the state until the 1940s.

The first live bear was a gift from the troops of the 107th Engineers, which was a unit of the 32nd Infantry Division stationed at Camp MacArthur in Waco. The soldiers were based in the city during World War I and are said to have given the live bear to a former Baylor President after a poker game. The bears are brought to the stadium by the Baylor Chamber spirit group on game days and they attend pre-game events and stay to be the living symbol of the university at the games. However, since 2010 the bears are no longer allowed at American football games on leashes. The USDA informed Baylor officials that they would no longer be permitted to bring the bears to games per Federal Code of Regulations 2.131(c)(1)which states "During public exhibition, any animal must be handled so there is minimal risk of harm to the animal and to the public, with sufficient distance and/or barriers between the animal and the general viewing public so as to assure the safety of the animals and the public." In the fall of 2005, the university finished renovation and construction of the Bill and Eva Williams Bear Habitat, a $1 million facility which includes a thirteen-foot (four-metre) waterfall, three pools, two dens, grass, and eye-level viewing. The facility is a United States Department of Agriculture- licensed Class C Zoo. It was formally dedicated on October 28, 2005.

=== Costumed mascots ===
Bruiser and Marigold are the costumed bear mascots of Baylor University.

Even though Baylor began its intercollegiate athletics in the 1890s, they did not have an official mascot until 1914. President Samuel Palmer Brooks held a vote to choose a mascot from dozens of options including the buffalo, bookworm, antelope, and ferret. It was then when the student body decided to pick an American black bear as their new mascot. In 1917, troops of the 107th Engineer Regiment who were training at nearby Camp MacArthur donated a live bear named Ted to the university. Ted made his debut at the 1917 Baylor–Texas A&M football game. Many years later, a costumed bear first made its appearance at the start of Baylor's 1981–1982 basketball season. This version of the bear did not last too long as a different version of the bear appeared in mid- to late-1980s.

Bruiser was modified two more times until the current version of Bruiser was introduced in late 2000s. In 2017, Baylor Spirit introduced Marigold as Bruiser's partner. Marigold is usually seen wearing a yellow Baylor Line jersey.

== See also ==
- List of college athletic programs in Texas
