= Tevin Elliot =

American football player (born 1991)

No. 18
- Position: Linebacker

Personal information
- Born: May 16, 1991 (age 35); Mount Pleasant, Texas
- Listed height: 6 ft 2 in (1.88 m)
- Listed weight: 245 lb (111 kg)

Career information
- High school: Mount Pleasant High School, Mount Pleasant, Texas
- College: Baylor (2009–2011)

Awards and highlights
- Sports Illustrated Impact Freshmen (2010)

Tevin Sherard Elliot (born May 16, 1991) is an American former college football linebacker who is currently serving 20 years in state prison for two rape charges against a female Baylor athlete.

== Biography ==
Regarded as only a one-star recruit by Rivals.com, Elliot was not highly recruited and not listed among the top linebacker or defensive end prospects of the class of 2009.

On October 14, 2010, at the age of 19, Elliot was named one of the Impact Freshmen of 2010 by Sports Illustrated.

On January 23, 2014, at the age of 22, Elliot was sentenced to 20 years in prison for two counts of sexual assault against a former female Baylor athlete. He is expected to serve a minimum of 10 years before becoming eligible for parole sometime in 2024.

In May 2016, reports surfaced that Baylor University and its head football coach Art Briles were aware of Elliot's assault and rape of a Baylor student. A report issued by the Pepper Hamilton law firm—hired to investigate Baylor's treatment of sexual assault claims—substantiated much of the report and indicated that Baylor took actions to cover up its students' reports of sexual assault and rape. Baylor Board of Regents chair, Richard Willis said that the investigation "revealed the university's mishandling of reports in what should have been a supportive, responsive and caring environment for students."
