= Ian McCaw =

Canadian-American athletic director

Current position
- Title: Athletic director
- Team: Liberty
- Conference: C-USA

Biographical details
- Education: Laurentian University, University of Massachusetts Amherst

Administrative career (AD unless noted)
- 1996: Tulane (interim AD)
- 1997–2002: Northeastern
- 2002–2003: UMass
- 2003–2016: Baylor
- 2016–present: Liberty

Ian McCaw is a Canadian-American college athletics administrator. He has served as the athletic director at Liberty University since 2016, when he resigned amid scandal from Baylor University.

== Biography ==
Born in Canada, McCaw graduated from Laurentian University in 1985. After working for the front office of the National Hockey League's Hartford Whalers, he entered college athletics administration. He served as athletic director at Northeastern University from 1997 to 2002 and at the University of Massachusetts Amherst from 2002 to 2003.

In 2003, McCaw was named athletic director at Baylor University. Under McCaw's direction, Baylor saw great growth and success as an athletic department, winning four team national championships and 56 Big 12 Conference championships. McCaw's hiring of Houston coach Art Briles in 2007, propelled the Bears football team to its greatest successes in program history, including Robert Griffin III's Heisman Trophy-winning season in 2011, back-to-back 11–2 records and Big 12 conference titles in the 2013 and 2014 seasons, and appearances in the 2014 Fiesta Bowl and 2015 Cotton Bowl. McCaw was named the Waco Tribune-Herald Sportsman of the Year in 2010, NACDA West Region Under Armour Athletic Director of the Year in 2012, and the Under Armour Athletic Director of the Year in 2014.

In 2015, amid the Baylor University sexual assault scandal, the university hired law firm Pepper Hamilton to investigate the university's handling of numerous sexual and non-sexual assaults by Baylor students and student-athletes. On May 26, 2016, the university announced that the firm's investigation had concluded that the football program specifically and McCaw's athletics department leaders generally failed to identify and respond to a pattern of sexual violence by a football player and to a report of dating violence. Investigators also concluded that the football program and athletics department leaders failed to take appropriate action in response to reports of a sexual assault involving multiple football players. The university announced that it had "sanctioned" McCaw and placed him on probation. He resigned his position at Baylor on May 30, 2016.

McCaw was named athletic director at Liberty University on November 28, 2016.
