= Baylor University sexual assault scandal =

2012–2016 assault allegations in Texas, US

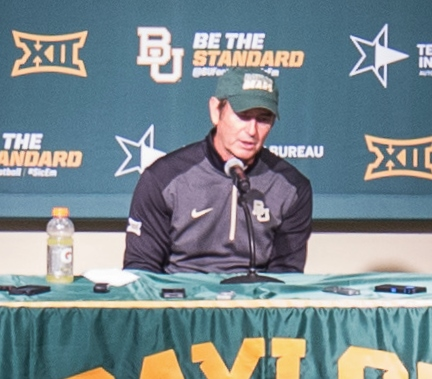
Former Baylor head football coach Art Briles in 2014

The Baylor University sexual assault scandal concerned numerous sexual and non-sexual assaults by Baylor University students, mostly players on the school's football team, and efforts by school officials to conceal them, from about 2012 to 2016.

The scandal was first brought to light when Tevin Elliot, a former linebacker, was sentenced on January 23, 2014, to 20 years in prison and fined US$10,000 for each of his two sexual assaults of a Baylor student in 2012. Sam Ukwuachu, a defensive end, was found guilty by a Texas court on August 21, 2015, of two counts of sexual assault of a Baylor student. That conviction was overturned, reinstated in 2018, and again reversed in July 2019. The 2019 reversal was then twice overruled by the Texas Court of Criminal Appeals, which reinstated the conviction in November of 2020. In December of 2025, the 10th Court of Appeals in Waco, Texas, rejected another attempt by Ukwuachu to appeal his conviction. Jacob Anderson, 20-year-old Phi Delta Theta president, was charged with sexual assault on March 3, 2016, after a fraternity party. Anderson pleaded no contest to a charge of unlawful restraint as part of a deal that included mandatory counseling, a $400 fine, and three years of probation. Shawn Oakman, a former All-American defensive end, was tried for sexual assault of a female student and found not guilty in February 2019.

The aftermath of the scandal resulted in the firing of head coach Art Briles, the demotion and eventually resignation of president Ken Starr, the resignation of athletic director Ian McCaw, and the resignation of Title IX coordinator Patty Crawford. Two others connected with the football program were also fired in connection with the scandal.

In 2018, a plaintiff's attorney, Jim Dunnam, accused Baylor of implementing a "concerted strategy to get the public to believe this is entirely and only a football-related problem."

== Background ==
In September 2015, following the conviction of former football players Tevin Elliot and Sam Ukwuachu for sexual assault, as well as allegations against other players, Baylor University commissioned the law firm Pepper Hamilton to conduct an independent external investigation regarding Baylor's handling of sexual violence.

In April 2016, former player Shawn Oakman was arrested on sexual assault charges.

After the presentation of Pepper Hamilton's report, the university fired head coach Art Briles on May 26, 2016. Baylor president Ken Starr and athletic director Ian McCaw also resigned. Jim Grobe, a former Wake Forest head coach and former chairman of the AFCA Ethics Committee, was hired on an interim basis.

After Briles threatened to sue the school for wrongful termination, Baylor provided an out-of-court settlement. In 2016, Briles and Baylor were co-defendants in a lawsuit filed by a woman allegedly sexually assaulted by a football player. After Briles's departure, many Baylor football players, including Jarrett Stidham, decided to transfer to other schools. Seven members of the 2016 recruiting class asked to be released from their National Letter of Intent, and six of the seven players who had committed to join the 2017 recruiting class withdrew.

One former student who sued the school accused it of fostering a "hunting ground for sexual predators" and suggested that the football program used rules prohibiting students from engaging in pre-marital sex and drinking alcohol to intimidate students into silence. Another 2016 lawsuit reportedly charged university officials with ignoring rape claims. In response to the multiple lawsuits, the school stated, "Baylor University is pleased that the parties were able to resolve this dispute".

== Incidents and trials ==
=== Tevin Elliot ===
Tevin Elliot joined the Baylor football team as a redshirt in 2009. Two years later, he was suspended for academic misconduct, but Starr lifted the suspension. Before being indicted on two separate counts of sexual assault, Elliot had allegedly assaulted three other women who kept it a secret and never pressed charges.

Elliot's first known sexual assaults were committed against a former Baylor student twice in the same night at a party on April 15, 2012. According to testimony given during the trial, the victim was the fifth person to be assaulted by Elliot. During the trial, two of the other victims detailed their sexual assaults that took place on October 31, 2009. On January 16, 2014, the jury indicted Elliot on two separate counts of sexual assault, allegedly involving two 18-year-old women on the same night in April 2012. A week later, on January 23, 2014, he was found guilty and was sentenced to twenty years in prison with a fine of $10,000 for each of his two sexual assaults. The jury had found him guilty in less than an hour and deliberated his punishment for two hours.

After his arrest, Elliot was suspended from Baylor's football program and campus on the claim of violating student and team policies. He later finished his degree at Bacone College in Muskogee, Oklahoma.

=== Sam Ukwuachu ===
In 2013, Sam Ukwuachu transferred to Baylor after requesting to be released from Boise State, wanting to be closer to home. Citing his depression and erratic behavior, Boise State released Ukwuachu. It was widely rumored that he was dismissed due to domestic violence or sexual assault incidents, both of which are denied by Boise State.

On the night of October 19, 2013, Baylor was celebrating its homecoming victory against Iowa State. Ukwuachu, who was ineligible to play the 2013 season because of National Collegiate Athletic Association (NCAA) rules regarding transfer students, was celebrating with the rest of the team nonetheless at the Waco convention center. Also at the celebration was an 18-year-old "Jane Doe" who was on friendly terms with Ukwuachu. Shortly before two in the morning, Ukwuachu texted Doe, who replied by saying that she would call him. During her testimony, Doe said that she had called him moments later and agreed to go with him to get something to eat or to go to another party—but after he picked her up that night, he turned the wrong way out of her apartment complex and drove her to his apartment instead. Doe described Ukwuachu as extremely agitated, getting angry with his dog and with a friend on the phone, who was in from out of town. After she resisted his initial advances, Doe testified, he began to grab her. "He was using all of his strength to pull up my dress and do stuff to me", she said. "He had me on my stomach on the bed, and he was on top of me." Doe testified that he pulled her dress up, pulled her underwear to the side, and forced her legs open with his toes, her head pressed between his bed and his desk, then forced himself inside of her. Doe was a virgin at the time. Texts between Ukwuachu and Doe from earlier in the week, before the encounter, were also revealed to the jury during trial. In those messages, Doe is unambiguous that she is not interested in a physical or romantic relationship with Ukwuachu; he sent her messages like "we have unfinished business", in reference to a previous encounter, which she characterized as Ukwuachu trying to put "moves" on her. She replied "I don't think we need finish any business" and "let's just chill." The night at his apartment, she testified, "I was screaming stop and no." According to her testimony, after he finished, he told her "This isn't rape", asked her if she was going to call the police, and left her to find a ride. Two of Doe's friends arrived in the middle of the night to pick her up, at which point she told them that Ukwuachu had raped her. The next day, Doe went to the hospital and was subject to a sexual assault nurse examination, which found vaginal injuries including redness, bleeding, and friction injuries.

The police decided not to make an arrest, but prosecutors brought the case before a grand jury. On June 25, 2014, the grand jury brought an indictment against Ukwuachu for two counts of sexual assault. The true bill of indictment does not provide any details about what happened and gave zero notice to the media. On August 7, two days after the case was exposed to the public, a judge granted a gag order on everyone involved in the case that prohibited the release of information to the media. The trial began with the jury selection in Texas on August 17, 2015. There are no publicly available details or accounts of how the night in question unfolded. There is no timeline of how the police handled it, or how the university responded, or any discussion of Baylor's investigation.

Ukwuachu was convicted of sexual assault and sentenced to 180 days in jail, 10 years' felony probation, 400 hours of community service, and had to register as a sex offender. In March 2017, Waco's 10th Court of Appeals overturned Ukwuachu's conviction and ordered a new trial based on evidence they felt shouldn't have been suppressed. This evidence indicated the victim sent text messages indicating she wanted to have sex with Ukwuachu. In a unanimous decision, the Texas Court of Criminal Appeals reinstated the conviction. They ruled that the trial court did not abuse its discretion when it did not allow into evidence text messages the woman sent to her friend while the woman and Ukwuachu were traveling to his apartment on the night of the reported assault and found the evidence "harmless".

On July 11, 2019, the 10th Court of Appeals reversed and remanded Sam Ukwuachu's 2015 sexual assault conviction after stating that prosecutors used false testimony and violated the person's due process rights. In the legal findings it was stated that there is a "reasonable likelihood that the false impression affected the judgment of the jury." In 2020, the sexual assault conviction was again reinstated.

=== Shawn Oakman ===
In February 2012, Shawn Oakman was dismissed from the Penn State Nittany Lions football team for a violation of team rules for stealing a sandwich and, while demanding the return of his identification card, for grabbing the wrist of the clerk who took it. Oakman enrolled at Baylor. In 2013, Oakman had been previously accused of assaulting an ex-girlfriend, but no charges were pressed, which led to Oakman not being disciplined by Baylor. It is unclear if Baylor knew of the incident.

A woman reported an assault that happened early Sunday morning of April 3, 2016, according to a Waco police affidavit. The woman told police she met Oakman at a nightclub and walked with him to his apartment, where she said Oakman forcibly removed her clothing and sexually assaulted her. The Associated Press generally does not identify alleged sexual assault victims. The woman told police she was able to leave the apartment after she was assaulted. The affidavit says the woman was "treated for her injuries" at a medical center, where a sexual assault examination was performed. Oakman was freed on $25,000 bond after his arrest.

On July 20, 2016, Oakman was indicted by a grand jury on charges of second-degree felony sexual assault. Oakman, once considered a potential second- or third-round pick in the 2016 NFL draft, went undrafted after his arrest. The trial was initially slated for December 2018. However, it did not begin until February 26 of the following year.

On February 28, 2019, Oakman was found not guilty of sexual assault.

== Aftermath ==
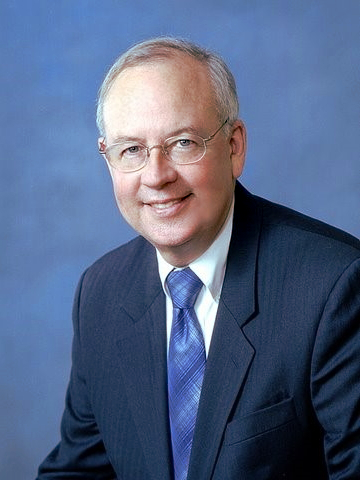
Ken Starr

In May 2016, Baylor terminated the contract of longtime head football coach Art Briles and University President Ken Starr resigned.

Title IX Coordinator Patty Crawford resigned after alleging that Baylor University did not allow her to do her job properly. She claimed that the more she pushed to help the victims, the more resistance she felt from the board of advisors. She insisted that the board was full of "a group of seniors that made sure that they were protecting the brand... instead of our students", contradicting earlier statements that she had made in an August interview. In that interview, Crawford had said that the university had an "excellent board that listens and is very supportive", that she had a "good partnership" with the athletics department and an "excellent board [of regents] that listens and is very supportive, specifically the committee that I report to. One step at a time, we're building it." Crawford said she resigned because she did not want to be a part of the problem.

In 2014, KWTX-TV claimed, "the football team may have only played a very minor role in any documented sexual assaults on Baylor students." In a 2016 story, the television station stated, "a closer review of [a 2014 report commissioned by Baylor University officials] reveals years of failures by University officials to fully adopt federal laws and guidelines governing student safety″.

In a 2017 lawsuit, victims suing the university alleged that from 2011 to 2014 at least 31 football players committed at least 52 rapes. In March 2017, the Texas Ranger Division confirmed that it was investigating the university. On March 7, 2017, US District Judge Robert L. Pitman refused to dismiss a lawsuit by victims against the university. On September 18, 2023, notification of settlement was entered into online court records for a lawsuit first filed by 15 victims in June 2016.

== Timeline ==
=== 2012 ===
- April 30, 2012: Football player Tevin Elliot is arrested on multiple charges of illegal sexual contact with a woman on campus.

=== 2014 ===
- January 23, 2014: With four women, in addition to the original accuser, coming forward with accusations, Tevin Elliot is convicted. Tanya, one of the women, stated Elliot pushed her into the mud, raped her, and then allowed her to get up. He then immediately shoved her, face first, into a metal fence and raped her again.
- January 24, 2014, Elliot is sentenced to two decades in a detention facility and fined US $10,000.

=== 2015 ===
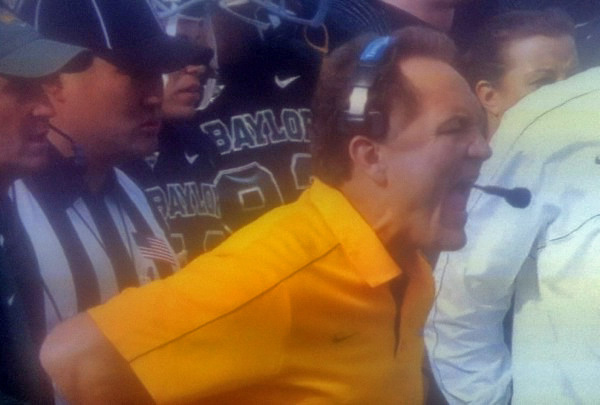
Phil Bennett

- June 2015: According to Defensive Coordinator Phil Bennett, player Sam Ukwuachu, who transferred from Boise State, would play for Baylor in 2014. Comments made based on information that was available at the time. However, soon thereafter, Ukwuachu is indicted for sexually assaulting a Baylor soccer player. Ukwuachu was immediately suspended from the team, but allowed to resume academic pursuits. He never stepped onto a football field for Baylor. He was later convicted, but his conviction was overturned before eventually being reinstated.
- August 17, 2015: Sam Ukwuachu's trial begins.
- August 20, 2015: After deliberating for five and half hours, the jury returns a guilty verdict for sexual assault charges against Ukwuachu.
- August 21, 2015: Ukwuachu is legally mandated to serve six months in a non-prison detention facility and ten years of probation. Ken Starr, the top official at the school, orders an internal investigation to ascertain how Ukwuachu was allowed to transfer in. Baylor Coach Art Briles claims he did not know why Ukwuachu transferred from Boise State. Boise State Coach Chris Petersen states he informed Briles of everything he knew, which did not include any incidents of sexual violence, as Boise State would have been required to report it had Petersen known of something. Boise State did not report any sexual violence charge against Ukwuachu.
- September 2, 2015: Baylor hires Pepper Hamilton to look into Baylor's response to sexual violence on school grounds.
- September 3, 2015: Starr claims Boise State did not give any indication that Ukwuachu's had undertaken bad acts before he departed the school.
- September 28, 2015: Ukwuachu, with a new attorney, files legal paperwork for another trial.
- October 26, 2015: A judge denies Ukwuachu's motion for a new trial.
- December 31, 2015: Baylor settles a lawsuit filed by the former soccer player allegedly assaulted by Ukwuachu.

=== 2016 ===
- January 31, 2016: Outside the Lines releases a video report of multiple women saying Tevin Elliot forced himself upon them without their consent. One victim claims she informed a member of the Baylor faculty of the assault but was told the university could take no action in the absence of a court decision.
- February 7, 2016: Due to criticism of his handling of the scandal, Ken Starr releases a statement saying, "Our hearts break for those whose lives are impacted by execrable acts of sexual violence."
- March 30, 2016: Jasmin Hernandez, the former Baylor attendee that suffered sexual assault by Elliot, files a lawsuit against the university over its failure to properly handle sexual-assault complaints.
- April 5, 2016: Baylor places "Real Men Respect Women" placards at the practice field.
- April 7, 2016: A Baylor graduate student accuses previous university player Shawn Oakman of sexually assaulting her.
- April 13, 2016: Oakman is arrested by Waco police.
- April 25, 2016: Oakman is accused of another assault, which occurred in 2013.
- May 5, 2016: In a report released by Sue Ambrose and David Tarrant of the Dallas Morning News, some within the Baylor community criticize Starr for being silent about rape and sexual offenses on school grounds and for how the school puts football above crime victims.
- May 13, 2016: The university states that its board has received the report from Pepper Hamilton regarding rape and sexual assaults at Baylor, but it refuses to divulge the information to the general populace.
- May 18, 2016: Outside the Lines publishes a report accusing Waco PD of obfuscating the sexual abuse allegations made against Baylor football players. The report claims one victim reported her assault to both Art Briles and Starr but they took no action.
- May 26, 2016: A summary of the Pepper Hamilton Report is released to the public. On the same day, Baylor announced that it had suspended Briles with intent to terminate him as soon as it could legally do so. The regents also announce Starr's removal as university president, effective May 31, but he would continue as Chancellor and faculty member.
- May 30, 2016: Baylor hires Jim Grobe, a former chairman of the AFCA Ethics Committee to replace Briles as head coach.
- May 31, 2016: Two football staff members are fired by the university in relation to the findings of the Pepper Hamilton Report.
- June 1, 2016: Multiple Baylor 2016 signees request to be released from the team. The releases are subsequently granted. Ken Starr resigns as Chancellor.
- June 3, 2016: During an interview with KWTX-TV, Starr admits it was possible that he laid eyes on a digital communication from a previous attendee with the subject, "I was raped at Baylor." Public relations consultant Merrie Spaeth, who had accompanied Starr to the interview, immediately interrupted the interview and repeatedly asked the station not to use the quote.
- June 6, 2016: Despite pressure from the public and Baylor's alumni base, the university announces it refuses to divulge the complete Pepper Hamilton findings.
- June 7, 2016: Dolores Lozano, an ex-manager for the school's acrobatics and tumbling team, states Briles and running backs coach, Jeff Lebby, took no action against running back Devin Chafin after she reported being physically assaulted three times by him. Baylor released a response statement but did not claim Briles and Lebby were unaware of what Chafin did.
- June 9, 2016: Baylor chooses to retain its player development staff, except for Briles who had already been fired. Also on June 9, 2016, a university attendee says she was sexually assaulted by someone who was still a player.
- June 10, 2016: The university and the former head football coach try to settle a lawsuit by a woman who claimed the school did not act on her complaints regarding being raped by Baylor Bears football player.
- June 13, 2016: University donors begin an effort to have Briles rehired as head coach, believing that he was made a scapegoat to cover for broader university issues.
- June 15, 2016: Several more women file lawsuits against the school for not acting following their claims of rape or sexual assault.
- June 16, 2016: Briles accuses the university of scapegoating and wrongfully terminating him.
- June 17, 2016: Briles reaches a settlement with Baylor regarding the payoff for his legally-binding agreement to work at the school. Also on June 17, 2016, a graduate of the school takes out a full-page newspaper ad criticizing Starr.
- June 20, 2016: A former Baylor student called Jane Doe, brings a federal lawsuit against the university, accusing it of forming a "hunting ground for sexual predators." She claims she was administered a substance and kidnapped from a house not on school grounds. Additionally on June 20, 2016, a lawyer for a former attendee that was sexually assaulted by a member of the university's gridiron team in 2012 claims Briles failed to keep his word to aid and say sorry to the wronged party.
- June 22, 2016: The Big 12 Conference asks the university to release the papers in regard to the rapes and sexual assault offenses at Baylor.
- June 28, 2016: Claiming Baylor did not act following their advisements of rapes or sexual assaults, three more women join a federal lawsuit against the university.
- June 29, 2016: Bob Bowlsby, Big 12 commissioner, tells reporters the university still has not released the requested documents concerning the sexual assault scandal.
- July 6, 2016: Briles asks a top court official on the national level to remove him from the lawsuit accusing him and top university faculty of not regarding a woman's assertions she was sexually assaulted by Elliot.
- July 7, 2016: After Briles is let go, quarterback Jarrett Stidham announces he will transfer from Baylor.
- July 13, 2016: Briles states he will coach again in 2017. Baylor hires Mack Rhoades to replace Ian McCaw.
- July 19, 2016: At Big 12 media days, Grobe claims that acting badly is not normal at Baylor and states that Baylor's issues are common to every school. Bowlsby makes inconsistent statements regarding the Big 12's knowledge of the scandal and personal opinions on it.
- July 20, 2016: Oakman is indicted for sexually assaulting a Baylor graduate student after he "forcibly removed" her clothes, forced her onto a bed, and sexually assaulted her at his Waco residence.
- July 23, 2016: An additional woman joins the federal lawsuit against the school because it failed to aid her and others following their claims of rape or sexual assaults.
- July 25, 2016: Brenda Tracy, an advocate for sexual assault victims, is invited by Baylor Football Coach Jim Grobe to speak to the team.
- July 28, 2016: A terminated university employee files a petition seeking more information as to why he was fired following the Pepper Hamilton findings. He states both Briles and McCaw were aware of a claimed offense.
- August 2, 2016: Baylor changes its media policy to prohibit assistant coaches from speaking to the media.
- August 6, 2016: Briles and Baylor file legal requests to end the Title IX complaint created by the school attendee that was sexually assaulted by Elliot.
- August 9, 2016: Speaking to reporters, Briles claims the fuss shall not prevent him for obtaining employment as a head coach.
- August 16, 2016: Briles tells reporters, "I've never done anything illegal, immoral or unethical."
- August 19, 2016: Starr steps down as a law school professor at Baylor days before classes start for the 2016/17 academic year.
- September 10, 2016: Briles apologizes for his part in the school's scandal, saying "I made mistakes. I did wrong, but I'm not doing this trying to make myself feel better for apologizing. I understand I made some mistakes. There was some bad things that went on under my watch. I was the captain of this ship. The captain of the ship goes down with it."
- September 16, 2016: Briles and Oakman attend Baylor's game against Rice in Houston. Briles leaves at halftime and Oakman goes into locker room after the game.
- September 19, 2016: Regarding Oakman stopping by to see players during the Rice game, Grobe tells the news outlets, "I don't know who he is." Baylor Quarterback Seth Russell defends Oakman claiming, "He's a great guy, just in a bad situation. We're not going to hold anything against him."
- September 21, 2016: Grobe, claiming his comments about Oakman were taken out of context, states he knew "of" the player but did not know what he looked like.
- September 21, 2016: Briles and McCaw are taken out of a legal complaint by a woman that stated they and Baylor did not pay attention to her assertions that she was sexually assaulted by a previous football person who had thereafter been found guilty.
- September 24, 2016: Starr claims Baylor does not suffer for an institutional issue and calls for the school to reveal the complete Pepper Hamilton findings. He defends Briles as an "honorable man" and criticizes news outlets for mishandling reporting.
- September 30, 2016: Brenda Tracy, supporter of those who have suffered rape and sexual assault, writes an article for The Huffington Post, claiming a school football player-development specialist pulled her aside following her meeting with the football players. "He was obviously very angry and defensive about what was happening. I was shocked by what he was saying. He knew that I had a voice in the media and he was doing nothing but making Baylor look guilty and he was validating for me that the football culture and that all the claims being made against them and Briles were probably true.". She made no mention of this incident immediately after her visit to Baylor on July 25, saying "Coach @WF_Grobie is a good man with a good heart. Thank you for having me @Baylor University".
- October 4, 2016: Patty Crawford, the Title IX coordinator at Baylor, resigns her job after less than two years. The university releases a statement saying, "Our understanding is that Patty was disappointed in her role in implementing the recommendations that resulted from the Pepper Hamilton investigation."
- October 5, 2016: Crawford claims that, after she upped the school's claims of rapes and sexual assault by 700% as the Title IX coordinator, the school's administration sought to quiet her. "I was being retaliated against."
- October 11, 2016: Grobe contradicts the school's information about the dismissal of defensive lineman Jeremy Faulk. The university's leaders stated it was Grobe's choice to dismiss the player because he was looked at for a rape or sexual assault offense. However, Grobe reveals it was actually a choice made by school leaders.
- October 19, 2016: The Texas Tribune reports that the United States Department of Education began a Title IX investigation regarding the school's response to rape and sexual assaults.
- October 26, 2016: A Waco Tribune report reveals that claims of rape and sexual assault at the school increased about fourfold in 2015.
- October 28, 2016: Baylor regents tell The Wall Street Journal that the sexual assault brouhaha is larger than had been made known. The news piece reveals that, since 2011, seventeen women had asserted that nineteen members of the Bears team had committed rape or assault, including four gang rapes. Briles allegedly knew of one of these but did not tell the police or Baylor officials.
- November 4, 2016: Baylor assistant coaches take to Twitter to voice their support for fired Coach Art Briles.
- November 5, 2016: At the home game against TCU, fans purchase pro-Briles T-shirts. After the game, Baylor Associate Athletic Director Heath Nielsen is accused of attacking James McBride of TheBlaze, when he saw McBride take a photo with a player from whom he had permission. A jury refused to indict the case because ""The evidence was not consistent with what the complainant alleged. It did not show an assault as the accuser had claimed.".
- November 6, 2016: After finding out about the sale of T-shirts supporting Briles, Brenda Tracy, who advocates for victims of sexual assault, calls for Baylor to end its football season. There was soon a backlash from Baylor fans, who sent messages attacking Tracy. The same day, Randy Cross, a College Football Hall of Fame inductee, voices his disgust for the scandal. He said, "I thought (the NCAA) should have stepped in (and punished Baylor for the sexual-assault scandal). I thought Art Briles should have gotten a show-cause. This whole idea that he can be back in coaching, I think, is an embarrassment. It's not only that; it's a travesty to those 17 women that have accused these kids of doing what they did."
- November 10, 2016: McLane Stadium namesake Drayton McLane states that he wants the honor of Briles "restored." He calls for the school to stop withholding the findings of the Pepper Hamilton Report.
- November 11, 2016: The university asserts Briles and McCaw knew of the gang rape allegation of a female student-athlete by five members of the football team. Both men failed to take action. Despite the admission by the school, Ken Starr, Baylor's disgraced president, later states he is skeptical that any gang rapes took place.
- November 12, 2016: Lee Corso and Paul Finebaum call for Baylor to discontinue their football season.
- November 22, 2016: It is announced that the university had reached a settlement with two students who had been gang raped by Baylor Bears football players. Also on November 22, Colin Cowherd calls for the program to be shut down. Noting the lack of safety for the media and for women on campus, he said, "Baylor, right now, has not earned the right to be in a Power Five conference."
- November 25, 2016: Because of the sexual assault scandal, Lubbock's Red Raider Outfitters chooses to not produce and sell commemorative T-shirts for the 2016 Texas Farm Bureau Shootout rivalry game between Baylor and Texas Tech, played at AT&T Stadium. In a social media post, the company stated, "Red Raider Outfitter stands for honesty, integrity, and compassion. In no way, can we support the shockingly poor handling of the sexual assaults at Baylor. Red Raider Outfitter stands with the survivors and with those who are outraged by Baylor's mismanagement. You, the fans, have spoken and requested that we not allow the Double T to be printed alongside any Baylor logo. Red Raider Outfitter proudly stands with our fans." The Red Raiders win the game, 54–35.
- November 28, 2016: Former Baylor Athletic Director Ian McCaw is hired to the same position at Liberty University. Additionally on November 28, current Baylor AD Mack Rhoades announces that, in spite of the scandal and being in the midst of a 5-game losing streak, Baylor would accept a post-season bowl bid to be coached by interim head coach Jim Grobe.
- November 29, 2016: In explaining why the university would not release the full, written Pepper Hamilton Report, Baylor Regent Dr. Ron Wilson stated, "Pepper Hamilton is an oral report so the process of writing would take four to six months. Also with the personal nature of the information so much of it would be redacted. Plus, the cost would be a factor."
- December 5, 2016: A group called Bears for Leadership Reform pushes for an independent investigation into the university's board of regents. They want the investigation to review conduct beginning even before the Pepper Hamilton Report was issued. Former Texas Governor Mark White said, "We've lost faith in Pepper Hamilton. The secrecy surrounding it does not pass the smell test."
- December 6, 2016: Baylor announces Matt Rhule as its new head football coach. Rhule leaves the same position at Temple. On the same day, the Southern Association of Colleges and Universities Commission places Baylor on accreditation probation due to the sexual assault scandal.
- December 8, 2016: Former Head Football Coach Art Briles files suit against Baylor for libel, slander, and conspiracy because officials accused him of covering up at least one report of sexual assault.
- December 12, 2016: Baylor regents vote unanimously to reject a call for a third party to review the university's handling of the sexual assault scandal. The call was made by a group of the school's major donors.
- December 13, 2016: Tom Hill, a former Baylor assistant athletic director, files suit against Pepper Hamilton, accusing the law firm of negligence and defamation. He asks for US $60,000 in damages. He had previously been offered and refused a US $34,373 severance package from the school. On the same day, a report released by the group Bears for Leadership Reform stated the university had already lost US $76 million due to the sexual assault scandal. It projected the total loss could top US$223 million.
- December 27, 2016: Bears wide receiver K. D. Cannon dedicates the team's Cactus Bowl win to Art Briles.

=== 2017 ===
- January 12, 2017: After rumors circulate that former Baylor head football coach Art Briles might be considered for the open offensive coordinator position at Auburn, a source confirms the university would not hire Briles.
- January 27, 2017: A Baylor University graduate files a lawsuit against the school, claiming she was raped by two football players, Tre'Von Armstead and Shamycheal Chatman, in 2013. The suit alleges 31 Baylor Bears football players committed 52 rapes, including five gang rapes involving 10 or more players at once, between 2011 and 2014. The filing further alleges that Baylor coaching staff put into effect a "Show em a good time" policy, which allowed things including, but not limited to, current players arranging to have women, alcohol, and illegal drugs at parties attended by recruits, paying for and taking underage recruits into strip clubs and bars, and paying for off-campus parties for players and recruits. It was at these parties where alleged gang rapes occurred repeatedly.
- February 1, 2017: Briles drops his defamation lawsuit against Baylor. Briles's attorney, Ernest Cannon, stated that the university "overloaded him in an endless supply of money, lawyers, resources, and no restraints on anything they'll do to achieve their goals."
- February 2, 2017: Cary Gray, Ron Murff, and David Harper provide documentation in response to a lawsuit filed by Colin Shillinglaw, a former assistant athletic director. The documentation shows both Briles and Shillinglaw knew about and covered up several infractions committed by Baylor football players, including underage drinking, indecent exposure, and sexual assault.
- February 3, 2017: In a unanimous vote, the board of directors of the Big 12 Conference opts to withhold 25% of future revenue payments (estimated to be $8.5 million for 2017) from Baylor until the school proves it is following conference bylaws and regulations as well as all components of Title IX.
- February 4, 2017: Brandon Washington, a member of the team's new coaching staff, is arrested during a sting operation for trying to solicit a prostitute.
- February 7, 2017: Bears defensive back Travon Blanchard is suspended from the team after being named in a protective order due to ongoing verbal and physical abuse of his girlfriend, extending as far back as July 4, 2016. At one point during the ongoing abuse, Blanchard broke the woman's finger, cutting it so badly she could not have it stitched.
- February 25, 2017: Baylor Lady Bears basketball head coach Kim Mulkey declares, "If somebody's around you and they ever say, 'I will never send my daughter to Baylor,' you knock them right in the face."
- March 1, 2017: The Texas Department of Public Safety announces the Texas Rangers were looking into the mishandling of sexual assault reports by Baylor.
- March 7, 2017: A federal judge in Austin rejects the university's request to have dismissed a lawsuit filed by 10 women who claim to have been sexually assaulted at the school.
- March 13, 2017: Baylor confirms DeMarkco Butler, associate director for football operations at the university, was dismissed after less than a month on the job. Butler, 28, was fired for sending inappropriate texts to a teenager considered to be an adult by Texas law.
- March 22, 2017: Tre'Von Armstead is arrested on three counts of sexual assault for allegedly forcing a woman to perform sex acts in mid-April 2013, while he was a tight end on the Baylor Bears football team.
- March 23, 2017: The United States Court of Appeals for the Tenth Circuit overturns the conviction of Sam Ukwuachu and grants him a new trial.
- April 5, 2017: ABC News reports the Baylor scandal led Texas legislators to push for laws with tougher sexual assault reporting requirements for universities in the state. According to the report, the proposed bills "would require school employees and student leaders to immediately relay reports of assaults to the school's investigations office or face possible criminal charges or expulsion, bar schools from using student conduct code violations to intimidate victims and witnesses, and make it easier to report assaults anonymously and online."
- April 7, 2017: In allowing a lawsuit against Baylor and Art Briles to move forward, U.S. District Judge Robert Pitman calls "disturbing" the claim made by the filer, a former student, that the university insulated football players from sexual assault allegations. Claims of intentional infliction of emotional distress against all defendants were dismissed.
- April 10, 2017: The Legal Intelligencer reports the lawyers for Colin Shillinglaw filed a notice of nonsuit, saying the case would be taken to arbitration instead.
- May 16, 2017: A former Baylor volleyball player files a Title IX lawsuit against the university, alleging she was drugged and raped by as many as eight football players in a single incident. The lawsuit further alleges the football team had a system of hazing freshman members by forcing them to bring freshman females to parties where "'trains' would be run on the girls", the football team's code for drugging and gang-raping.
- July 7, 2017: Baylor settles a lawsuit with a former female student over the mishandling of her alleged attack in 2015. This marks the first lawsuit the university settled relating to the sexual abuse scandal.
- July 18, 2017: Travon Blanchard is arrested on a misdemeanor assault charge stemming from domestic violence allegations which earlier led to his suspension from the team.
- August 15, 2017: Jasmin Hernandez, the first former student to sue Baylor for ignoring and mishandling rape allegations, settled her case with the school.
- August 28, 2017: The Hamilton Tiger-Cats, a team in the Canadian Football League, announce they are hiring Art Briles as Assistant Head Coach of Offense, to major blowback on social media and calls for boycotts by fans. Following the outrage on both sides of the border, the Canadian Football League and the Tiger-Cats released a joint statement announcing that Briles would not be joining the team. On August 29, Tiger-Cats owner Bob Young stated, "We made a large and serious mistake. We want to apologize to our fans, corporate partners and the Canadian Football League. it has been a difficult season and we are searching for answers. This is clearly not one of them."
- September 5, 2017: Baylor settles the lawsuit brought by "Elizabeth Doe", the woman who claimed to have knowledge of at least 52 acts of rape by more than 30 Bears football players over several years.
- September 22, 2017: The Houston Chronicle reports a court filing revealed Baylor University Interim President David E. Garland stated that some women who said they had been sexually assaulted were willing victims who deserved God's wrath.
- December 7, 2017: Waco Tribune-Herald reports Baylor University Title IX Coordinator Kristan Tucker resigned, effective January 2, 2018. Tucker served under former Title IX Coordinator Patty Crawford and was promoted to the position upon Crawford's resignation.

=== 2018 ===
- February 16, 2018: NBC Sports reports that two Baylor football players are under investigation for allegedly assaulting a female member of the Baylor equestrian team on November 12, 2017, hours after Baylor's loss to Texas Tech in Arlington.
- March 14, 2018: Baylor head coach Matt Rhule confirms three players have been suspended from the team due to the November 12 alleged sexual-assault incident. Another player was suspended for unspecified reasons. The players are linebacker Eric Ogor, safety Tre'von Lewis, safety John Arthur, and defensive end Justin Harris.
- March 31, 2018: Reuters reports ousted coach Art Briles was paid $15.1 million in severance pay following his dismissal in the wake of the sexual assault scandal. Former university president and chancellor Kenneth Starr received more than $4.5 million in severance pay.
- April 4, 2018: It's On Us, a Baylor student organization, opens an art exhibit displaying the clothes sexual assault victims were wearing at the time they were attacked.
- April 6, 2018: Deadspin reports that, in March 2018, Liberty University settled lawsuits filed by three players who were dismissed from the Liberty Flames football team for sexual-assault claims which were never substantiated. The players alleged the university committed defamation and Title IX violations. The lawsuits stated that Liberty overreacted and dismissed the players to make up for hiring officials sullied by the sexual-assault scandal at Baylor.
- April 19, 2018: Baylor announces Laura Johnson as its new Title IX Coordinator. She was scheduled to assume the role on June 11, 2018.
- June 6, 2018: In a 9–0 decision, the Texas Court of Appeals reinstates Samuel Ukwuachu's conviction. The court states that the lower appeals court erred when in its judgement that the trial court abused its discretion when judging the text messages.
- June 19, 2018: In a sworn deposition, former Baylor Athletic Director Ian McCaw claims the university indulged in "an elaborate plan that essentially scapegoated black football players and the football program for being responsible for what was a decades-long, university-wide sexual assault scandal".
- August 7, 2018: In an effort to continue avoiding sanctions from the NCAA the law firm representing Baylor reportedly recommends the school self-impose a 2018 bowl ban. However, Baylor denies the claim.
- August 9, 2018: The Waco Tribune-Herald reports Baylor officials were aware of and discussed issues regarding player Tevin Elliot. They opted to "put potential disciplinary action on hold months before the then-football player raped another student".
- August 22, 2018: PRWeek releases a story stating Baylor used Matt Burchett, director of student activities at the school, as a mole to "infiltrated sexual assault survivor groups to shape PR strategy and talking points on how to handle the groups and student demonstrations".
- August 23, 2018: Jacob Walter Anderson, a former Phi Delta Theta fraternity president at Baylor, reaches a plea agreement and is expected to plead no contest to charges that he drugged and sexually assaulted a female student at a party in South Waco in March 2016.
- August 30, 2018: In a response filing in the lawsuit brought by former Baylor student Delores Lozano, Briles accused the school's board of regents for blaming the football team and its coaches when it was the administration and the Baylor Police Department who actually covered up reports of sexual assault.
- October 1, 2018: The Fort Worth Star-Telegram reports that the NCAA has completed its investigation of the sexual assault scandal and released a formal notice of allegations against Baylor. The school is accused of "lack of institutional control" and Art Briles is accused of "failure to promote an atmosphere of compliance."
- October 15, 2018: According to a CBS News report, under a plea agreement, Jacob Walter Anderson pleaded no contest to one count of unlawful restraint. He had been accused of raping a female student during a party.
- December 10, 2018, Anderson's plea is accepted and he will serve no jail time. Instead, it is agreed that Anderson will seek counseling and pay a $400 fine.

=== 2019 ===
- February 28, 2019: After a two-day trial, Shawn Oakman is found not guilty of sexual assault.
- March 7, 2019: U.S. District Judge Robert Pittman issues an order requiring Pepper Hamilton to provide documents to the attorneys representing women who have sued Baylor alleging Title IX violations. Pepper Hamilton received the documents from Baylor while they worked for the school in regard to multiple sexual assault allegations.
- March 27, 2019: A former member of the Baylor equestrian team files a lawsuit against the university, claiming her sexual assault investigation was handled improperly under federal Title IX law.
- July 10, 2019: After finding prosecutors used false testimony and violated his due-process rights, the 10th Circuit Court of Appeals reverses the 2015 sexual assault conviction of Sam Ukwuachu and grants him a new trial.

=== 2023 ===
- September 18, 2023: Notification of settlement is entered into online court records for a lawsuit first filed by 15 victims in June 2016. Its terms were not divulged. Among the suit's plaintiffs was a woman who claimed she was sexually assaulted by a football player in April 2014. Another plaintiff claimed two players assaulted her in April 2016. A player on Baylor's club rugby team stated she was assaulted in the fall of 2012.

== See also ==
- Penn State child sex abuse scandal
- Baylor University basketball scandal
- USA Gymnastics sex abuse scandal
- George Tyndall, physician under investigation for serial sexual assault of students at the University of Southern California
- Vanderbilt rape case
- 2024 Cornell University rape allegations
