= Jeff Ray =

American basketball coach

Jeff Ray is the men and women's golf head coach, life skills coordinator, and former basketball head coach at Midwestern State University in Wichita Falls, Texas. On January 8, 2002, he was named the school's Director of Athletics. He took over the reins of the men's basketball program a year and a half later and became the golf head coach in 2006. Ray has now been a part of the MSU athletics family as a player, coach, or administrator for 19 of the past 23 years.

== Playing history ==
Ray earned all-state accolades as a prep senior at Archer City High School, located just south of Wichita Falls. Ray helped the Wildcats win 44 consecutive district games while playing for his father, Bobby.

Ray started his college basketball career at Midland Junior College and Cooke County College, but transferred to MSU in 1982 to play for NAIA Hall of Fame coach Dr. Gerald Stockton. During his senior season, Ray helped the Indians post a 25-16 mark and make an appearance in the 1984 NAIA National Tournament.

== Coaching history ==
Following his senior year, Ray stayed at MSU for two more seasons to serve as a graduate assistant under women's basketball coach Kim Griffee.

Ray then moved to Lon Morris College in Jacksonville, Texas, where he was an assistant coach under Vic Trilli for two seasons.

Ray returned to MSU in 1988 to become Dr. Gerald Stockton's full-time assistant coach. Ray helped Stockton get the Indians program back on a winning track and make appearances in the NAIA National Tournament semifinals in 1993 and 1994.

Ray took on the additional duties of coaching the women's program in the 1992–93 and 1993-94 seasons. Ray's two seasons at the Lady Indians helm were two of the program's finest ever, with his teams posting 22-8 and 28-6 records and qualifying for the NAIA national tournament both seasons. Ray also coached the Lady Indians only 1st Team NAIA All-Americans in Serena Carter (1993) and Lynn Buckmaster (1994).

Following the retirement of Stockton in 1994, Ray relinquished the reins of the women's program to take over the men's team. Over the course of six years, Ray's teams posted a record of 118-60, a winning percentage of .663. Ray's teams averaged nearly 20 wins per season and made two appearances in the NAIA National Tournament and two appearances in the NCAA Division II national tournament.

Ray then spent a season at the University of North Texas as an assistant coach, again under Vic Trilli, and about six months in the private sector before returning to MSU in 2002.

In Ray's first season back as head coach the Indians compiled a 16-12 record and finished fourth in the Lone Star Conference South Division.

Ray lead the men's basketball team to their fourth conference championship in March 2009. A little more than two weeks later, he stepped down as basketball head coach. He compiled a record of 230-121 in the 12 seasons that he was head coach.

== Record by season ==
=== As women's head coach ===
- 1992-1993 (22-8)
- 1993-1994 (28-6)

=== As men's head coach ===
- 1994-1995 (19-11)
- 1995-1996 (17-11)
- 1996-1997 (17-11)
- 1997-1998 (11-15)
- 1998-1999 (27-5)
- 1999-2000 (27-7)
- 2003-2004 (16-12)
- 2004-2005 (18-11)
- 2005-2006 (16-11)
- 2006-2007 (24-7)
- 2007-2008 (13-13)
- 2008-2009 (25-7)

== Championships ==
- 1998-99 - Lone Star Conference Tournament Champion
- 1999-00 - Lone Star Conference Tournament Champion
- 2006-07 - Lone Star Conference Tournament Champion
- 2008-09 - Lone Star Conference Tournament Champion
