= Baylor University basketball scandal =

2003 controversy

The Baylor University basketball scandal occurred in the early 2000s, when Baylor University's men's basketball program was investigated and punished for numerous infractions by the National Collegiate Athletic Association (NCAA). The scandal broke out after the 2003 murder of Baylor basketball player Patrick Dennehy. Dennehy's teammate Carlton Dotson pleaded guilty to the murder and was sentenced to a 35-year prison term.

Shortly after Dennehy's initial disappearance, Baylor and the NCAA began investigations into multiple allegations, ranging from drug use among players to improper payments to players by the coaching staff. Baylor self-imposed punishments, which the NCAA augmented to include extended probation for the school through 2010, the elimination of one year of non-conference play, and a ten-year show-cause penalty on resigned head coach Dave Bliss. The sanctions so crippled the basketball program that they didn't have another winning season until 2008. It is one of the harshest penalties ever imposed on a Division I program that didn't include the NCAA's "death penalty".

== Disappearance and murder of Patrick Dennehy ==
Patrick Dennehy was a junior forward who transferred to Baylor University following his sophomore season at the University of New Mexico (UNM) in 2001–2002. In the summer of 2003, Dennehy and his new teammate Carlton Dotson indicated that they were concerned about their safety. After both men failed to attend a party, there were indications that something had gone wrong when Dennehy's family had not heard from him and Dennehy's roommate returned home to find that his dog had not been fed. On June 25, Dennehy's car was found in Virginia Beach, Virginia, with its license plates removed.

An affidavit filed on June 23, which was unsealed on June 30, which sought a search warrant for Dennehy's computer reported that an informant in Delaware told police that Dotson, who was by now at home in Hurlock, Maryland, told a cousin that he had shot and killed Dennehy during an argument while firing guns in the Waco, Texas area. On July 21, Dotson was charged with Dennehy's murder and taken into custody in Maryland. On July 26, a badly decomposed body was found in a gravel pit near Waco and was later identified as Dennehy. On July 30, his death was ruled a homicide, and on August 7, a memorial service was held for Dennehy in San Jose, California.

Following a stint in which Dotson's competency to stand trial was in question, he pleaded guilty to the murder on June 8, 2005, and was sentenced a week later to 35 years in prison. Dotson was released on parole on November 19, 2024. According to court records, Dotson owes $39,634 in court fees and costs; with $904 being paid back.

== NCAA violations ==
In early August 2003, allegations arose concerning Dennehy's ability to remain with the Baylor basketball team during the 2002–2003 academic year without an athletic scholarship. Allegations of impropriety within Baylor's athletic department surfaced and university president Robert B. Sloan appointed an investigative panel to determine if there were any potential violations of National Collegiate Athletic Association (NCAA) rules at the school.

=== Improper payments to players ===
Having reached the limits on team scholarships, Baylor head coach Dave Bliss had surreptitiously paid Dennehy's tuition and that of teammate Corey Herring. Herring and his family had no knowledge of this; he was under the impression that he was on scholarship. During the investigations, Bliss publicly claimed Dennehy had paid his tuition by being a drug dealer, but was soon under investigation by the university and the NCAA. Additionally, in the weeks preceding his resignation, Bliss flew to New York City—without the knowledge of anyone, including his wife—in an attempt to convince Herring's mother to lie about paying $18,641. Later, Bliss pretended to be Herring's father—in an attempt to determine what evidence school and NCAA investigators might find against him—when he called Baylor's financial aid office to check on payments made to Herring's account.

=== Drug use ===
On August 1, further allegations arose from Dotson's estranged wife, Melissa Kethley, and by Sonya Hart, the mother of Baylor athlete Robert Hart. They reported widespread abuse of marijuana and alcohol among Baylor players that was subsequently ignored by Bliss and his staff. Sonya Hart revealed that she had raised concerns about the drug use with associate athletic director Paul Bradshaw, but that no one ever got back in contact with her.

=== Recruiting violations ===
On August 5, two members of the 2002–2003 Baylor basketball team told The Dallas Morning News that members of the coaching staff were present during a pickup game involving recruit Harvey Thomas during his official visit to Baylor. One of the two players said that Bliss and assistant coach Rodney Belcher were both present during the game. NCAA rules state that staff observation of a recruit's athletic activities, directly or indirectly, during their official visit to their university constitute an "illegal tryout."

=== Prior violations at SMU ===
It was also revealed that Bliss had apparently broken several NCAA regulations during his tenure at Baylor and during his tenure at Southern Methodist University (SMU) from 1980 to 1988. At the time, both schools were members of the Southwest Conference. On August 2, an NCAA memo obtained by the Fort Worth Star-Telegram detailed major rules violations, including booster payments of $2,000 to $5,000 to center Jon Koncak during his junior and senior years. Both Bliss and SMU received no NCAA penalties for the infractions because the university had already received the death penalty for massive violations in their football program in February 1987, and the decision was made not to further punish the SMU athletic department. Shortly after the investigation, Bliss left SMU to take a position at New Mexico in 1988, before joining the Baylor program in 1999.

== Bliss resignation ==
For his part, Bliss denied all allegations saying, "We have followed the rules, however difficult they may be, for 30 years." However, on the day after Dennehy's memorial service, Bliss met with Baylor investigators and was told that Dennehy's girlfriend had accused him of paying the portions of Dennehy and Herring's tuition not covered by financial aid. Both payments violated NCAA rules. Bliss confessed to making the payments, which totaled $7,000. This, combined with the violations of Baylor's drug test policy and Bliss' presence at Thomas' official visit to Baylor, led Sloan to force his resignation on August 8, 2003. Athletic director Tom Stanton resigned on the same day. Although there was no evidence that Stanton knew of the violations, he resigned to take responsibility for what happened.

=== Preliminary sanctions imposed ===
On the same day that Bliss resigned, Baylor's investigative committee announced their preliminary findings and imposed preliminary sanctions on the basketball program. Baylor placed itself on two years' probation and withdrew from the 2003-04 Big 12 Conference tournament, effectively removing itself from postseason consideration. A full release was granted to every player in the men's basketball program; any player who wished to transfer would be allowed to do so without penalty.

=== Lying to investigators ===
On August 16, the Star-Telegram reported that Bliss had told players to lie to investigators by indicating that Dennehy had paid for his tuition by dealing drugs. These conversations were taped on microcassette by assistant coach Abar Rouse from July 30 to August 1. On the tapes, Bliss was heard instructing players to fabricate the story of Dennehy being a drug dealer to Baylor investigators and also said that talking to the McLennan County Sheriff's Department would give him the opportunity to "practice" his story. The tapes also showed that Bliss and his staff knew that Dennehy had been threatened by two teammates when they publicly denied such knowledge. Rouse taped the conversations after Bliss threatened to fire him if he did not go along with the scheme. The revelations shocked Baylor and the college basketball community. However, despite the potential allegations of extortion, obstruction of justice and witness tampering, no criminal charges were filed against Bliss.

== Penalties ==
Baylor continued to investigate the basketball program over the next seven months and released their final report on February 26, 2004. The full list of major program violations included:

- Bliss paying for tuition for two players, Dennehy and Herring, and attempting to conceal it.
- Coaching staff providing meals, transportation, lodging and clothing to athletes.
- Coaching staff paying for tuition and fees for a recruit at another school.
- Bliss's encouragement of school boosters to donate to a foundation tied to a basketball team that included prospective Baylor recruits.
- Failure to report positive drug test results by athletes.
- Failure by the entire coaching staff to "exercise institutional control over the basketball program."

Other improprieties of a lesser nature were also discovered.

As a result, Baylor imposed further penalties on the basketball program. The program's probation was extended for an additional year, scholarships were reduced for the 2004–05 and 2005–06 seasons, expense-paid recruiting visits were also reduced for the next two seasons, other recruiting abilities were also inhibited, and one exhibition game was eliminated for the 2004–05 season. Baylor announced that it would re-certify its entire athletic department conformed to NCAA rules. Baylor forwarded its findings to the NCAA, who imposed further penalties on the school on June 23, 2005:

- The university's probation was extended until June 22, 2010.
- Baylor was barred from playing any nonconference games for the 2005–06 season, the first time such a "half-season" penalty had been imposed.
- The NCAA further reduced Baylor's paid recruiting visits from twelve to nine for the 2006–07 season. (Baylor had already imposed restrictions on recruiting visits for the 2004–05 and 2005–06 seasons.)
- In addition, other smaller penalties were also imposed on Baylor.

The NCAA also imposed a ten-year show-cause penalty on Bliss for "unethical conduct." This meant that until 2015, any NCAA member school that wanted to hire Bliss had to report to the organization every six months stating that he was in compliance with any restrictions the NCAA imposed on him, unless that school could demonstrate that Bliss had served his punishment. It is the most severe penalty the NCAA can hand a coach. As most schools will not even consider hiring someone with a show-cause order outstanding, the order had the effect of blackballing Bliss from the NCAA coaching ranks for the duration of the penalty. The NCAA found that Bliss and his staff had demonstrated "a blatant and sweeping disregard" for their rules. Besides paying parts of Dennehy and Herring's tuition, Bliss admitted that he'd concealed under-the-table payments to Herring and lied to both the NCAA and Baylor investigators. He also admitted to telling assistant coaches to file false expense reports and lie to Baylor investigators.

Doug Ash, who had been Bliss's top assistant throughout Bliss's coaching career at Oklahoma, SMU, New Mexico and Baylor, was hit with a five-year show-cause order. Another former assistant, Rodney Belcher, was hit with a seven-year show-cause order.

In its final report, the NCAA called the violations at Baylor as serious as those which occurred at SMU almost twenty years earlier. Indeed, Baylor was eligible for the death penalty since its men's tennis program was on probation for major violations; the NCAA can hand down the death penalty for a second major violation within five years, even if it occurs in a different sport. However, the organization praised Baylor for taking prompt action once the violations came to light (in marked contrast to SMU, where there was evidence that administrators knew about the violations and did nothing).

== Aftermath ==
The scandal left Baylor's basketball program in ruins. Lawrence Roberts, John Lucas III, Kenny Taylor, and Tyrone Nelson transferred to other schools. Two of the four became immediate stars at programs that would win regular-season conference titles in 2004 – Roberts became the main inside force at Mississippi State, leading their team in scoring and rebounding and being selected as a first-team All-American, while Lucas stayed in the conference at Oklahoma State, becoming their second-leading scorer and assists leader while helping his team to reach the Final Four. Taylor transferred to the University of Texas at Austin and Nelson enrolled at Prairie View A&M University. A year later, Herring transferred to Canisius College.

Bliss' successor, Scott Drew, was hired two weeks after Bliss' ouster. Due to his unusually late hiring–two months before practice and three months before the season opener–and the crippling sanctions imposed by both the school and the NCAA, Baylor only won a total of 36 games, including only thirteen conference games, from 2003 to 2007. However, Drew quickly turned the program around after his recruits arrived; Baylor made the 2008 NCAA tournament, finished second in the 2009 NIT, and advanced to the Elite Eight of the 2010 and 2012 NCAA tournaments—the school's deepest NCAA run since going to the Final Four in 1950. In 2019–20, Drew led the Bears to the greatest season in school history at the time. Baylor finished with a 26–4 regular-season record, was ranked 4th in the final Coaches Poll, and was projected to a #1 seed in the 2020 NCAA tournament which would've been a first for the program. Unfortunately for Baylor, the 2020 Tournament was canceled due to the COVID-19 pandemic. The following season, Baylor won the Big 12 regular season title for the first time in program history, received a #1 seed for the 2021 NCAA tournament's South Region, advanced to its first Final Four appearance since 1950, and made its first title game appearance since 1948, where the Bears won their first national championship.

Rouse sued his attorney in 2005 for releasing the incriminating tapes of Bliss, claiming that it breached the attorney–client privilege. Rouse's attorney claims she did not know how the tapes got transcribed, but the journalist who published them said he got them from her.

After Baylor, Rouse worked as a graduate assistant coach at Midwestern State University in Wichita Falls, Texas. He left the position in October 2007 and has not had another basketball job since; he has said that he has been effectively blackballed from the collegiate ranks for taping Bliss's statements. Despite the near-universal revulsion at Bliss's actions, many leading members of the college basketball coaching fraternity considered Rouse's recordings a serious breach of trust. For example, Mike Krzyzewski said that if he ever found out one of his assistants had been secretly taping him, "there's no way he would be on my staff". Jeff Ray, the Midwestern coach who hired Rouse, commented: "I'm right in the middle of it, don't get me wrong. But sometimes the things you see are pretty disgusting. Why is there this black cloud hanging over him? He did nothing wrong. To me, this is all a testimony to the sad state of affairs of our profession."

Bliss eventually returned to the college basketball coaching ranks, in 2015, as head coach at Southwestern Christian University, an NAIA member. He resigned that position in April 2017, following the airing of the Showtime documentary Disgraced, which chronicled the cover-up at Baylor.
