= Nicole Seligman =

American attorney and corporate director (born 1957)

Nicole Seligman (born 1957) is an American attorney and corporate director.

She received national attention in the United States for her representation of Lieutenant Colonel Oliver North during the Iran–Contra hearings, and of President Bill Clinton during his impeachment trial.

Seligman is a former executive vice president and general counsel of Sony Corporation and former president of Sony Corporation of America.

== Early life and education ==
She earned a B.A., magna cum laude, from Harvard College (Radcliffe) in 1978, and, in 1983, a J.D., magna cum laude, from Harvard Law School, where she edited the Harvard Law Review. In between college and law school (1978–1980), she worked as associate editorial page editor for Hong Kong's Asian Wall Street Journal (1978–1980). After law school, she clerked for Judge Harry T. Edwards at the U.S. Court of Appeals for the District of Columbia (1983–1984) and Justice Thurgood Marshall on the Supreme Court of the United States (1984–1985).

== Career ==
Seligman began her career in the private sector as a partner at Williams & Connolly in Washington, D.C. Only shortly after joining the firm, she was assigned to assist partner Brendan Sullivan in representing Lt. Col. North before Congressional hearing and at his trial. Eleven years later, her more senior partner, David Kendall, President Clinton's outside counsel, asked for her assistance. She appeared with Clinton when he testified before the grand jury in the Monica Lewinsky scandal, and she spoke on his behalf before the Senate at the impeachment trial. Her other clients at Williams & Connolly included large media organizations such as CNN (in the Operation Tailwind matter), ABC, and occasionally the National Enquirer (which was primarily represented by Kendall).

In September 2001, she was recruited by Howard Stringer, CEO of Sony Corporation of America, to become an executive vice president and general counsel. In June 2003, she became corporate executive officer of the worldwide Sony Corporation. When Stringer became Sony Corporation CEO in June 2005, Seligman rose to become general counsel of that corporation, retaining the same role at SCA. She became president of Sony Corporation of America on June 27, 2012.

In 2013, the Council on CyberSecurity announced that Seligman is a member of the organization's advisory board.

On February 18, 2016, it was announced that Seligman is stepping down from the positions of president of Sony Entertainment and Sony Corporation of America; In an internal memo to employees, it was stated that she would leave at the end of March.

In March 2024, Seligman joined OpenAI's board of directors.

== Personal life ==
She is married to Joel I. Klein, former chancellor of the New York City Department of Education and former U.S. Assistant Attorney General in charge of the Justice Department's Antitrust Division.

== See also ==
- List of law clerks for the tenth seat of the Supreme Court of the United States
