= Robert Barnett (lawyer) =

American lawyer (1946–2025)

- Born: Robert Bruce Barnett; August 26, 1946; Waukegan, Illinois, U.S.
- Died: September 25, 2025 (aged 79); Washington, D.C., U.S.
- Education: University of Wisconsin (BA); University of Chicago (JD)
- Political party: Democratic
- Spouse: Rita Braver (m. 1972)
- Children: 1

Robert Bruce Barnett (August 26, 1946 – September 25, 2025) was an American lawyer who was a partner at the law firm Williams & Connolly.

== Early life and education ==
Robert Bruce Barnett was born on August 26, 1946, in Waukegan, Illinois, the son of Betty and Bernard Barnett. His father ran the Waukegan office of the Social Security Administration and had a popular call-in radio show that offered advice on federal retirement benefits. In 1964, he graduated from Waukegan High School where he served as class president. In 1968, he graduated with a bachelor's degree in English and History from the University of Wisconsin-Madison (where he was a member of Pi Lambda Phi fraternity), and in 1971 he graduated with a J.D. degree from the University of Chicago, where he was comment editor for the University of Chicago Law Review.

== Career ==
After school, he clerked for John Minor Wisdom in New Orleans (where he married Rita Braver who accepted a job at CBS affiliate WWL-TV). In 1972, the couple moved to Washington, D.C. where he clerked for Supreme Court justice Byron White (succeeding David E. Kendall) and his wife became a news-desk editor at the CBS News bureau. After his one-year clerkship, he accepted a position as aide to Minnesota Senator Walter Mondale who assigned him the task of soliciting support for legislation to curb filibusters. He became close friends with fellow Mondale aide Michael Berman.

In 1975, he was hired by Joseph A. Califano Jr. and joined the law firm of Williams, Connolly & Califano. Soon after, Mondale was chosen as Jimmy Carter's presidential running mate, Barnett went to Atlanta to help run Mondale's campaign. After Carter's win, Barnett returned to his law practice. He made a name for himself defending white-collar clients including Toyota distributor, Jim Moran. In 1984, Barnett helped to prep Mondale's running mate, Geraldine Ferraro, for her debate against George H. W. Bush; and defended her from accusations about her husband's alleged Mob affiliations and questionable tax returns. He also represented David Stockman and Kitty Dukakis, helping both to secure lucrative contracts with book publishers. In 1992, he again served as a debate coach this time for Bill Clinton in his successful presidential campaign. Returning to private practice, he found many customers eager to have him represent them in securing lucrative contracts and advances for their books, including Secretary of State James Baker; former Vice President Dan Quayle and that of his wife Marilyn Quayle; and James Carville and his wife Mary Matalin. He also expanded into representing television news people in contract negotiations including at one point his wife, Rita Braver, Chris Wallace, Andrea Mitchell, Brit Hume, Wolf Blitzer, Sanjay Gupta, Lesley Stahl, and Brian Williams.

In 1992, he became the personal attorney of Hillary Clinton (per her memoir) and assisted the Clintons when their aide Vince Foster committed suicide. After criticism arose as to whether it was appropriate for Barnett to represent so many newscasters and journalists who were reporting on the White House while also serving as lawyer to the Clintons; Barnett resigned from representing the Clintons turning his work over to fellow Williams & Connolly attorney David E. Kendall. He represented George Stephanopoulos in a book about the Clintons. In 1997, he went back to representing the Clintons, and helped to negotiate the sale of their post-presidential memoirs; and helped former Clinton officials to secure new contracts (Donna Shalala as president of the University of Miami and Lawrence Summers as president of Harvard University. He also represented Dick Cheney, Laura Bush, Jenna Bush, Alan Greenspan, and Tony Blair in securing book contracts and advances with publishers. In December 2000, he auctioned Hillary Clinton's memoirs to Simon & Schuster for $8 million - then the 2nd-largest advance ever paid for a nonfiction title; and followed it in August 2001 with Bill Clinton's memoirs for the largest nonfiction advance to date. He secured multimillion-dollar book deals for Tim Russert; Edward Kennedy; Karl Rove (purchased by former client Mary Maitlin); and in 2004, Barack Obama with the reissuance of Dreams From My Father and sell The Audacity of Hope and Change We Can Believe In. Despite this, he remained a Hillary Clinton supporter and assisted her preparing for all her primary debates against Obama. Barnett prided himself on representing clients regardless of political affiliation and also assisted outgoing Republican officials Henry Paulson, George W. Bush, and other serving candidates.

He also served as a practice debate opponent for many Democratic presidential and vice-presidential candidates. In 2004, Barnett served on Board of Trustees of the John F. Kennedy Center for the Performing Arts and, in 2015, he served as senior counsel for the center.

== Personal life and death ==
On April 10, 1972, Barnett married Rita Braver, whom he met while in college. They have a daughter, Meredith Jane Barnett (born 1978); Meredith married Daniel Ross Penn, April 5, 2008.

Barnett died at a hospital in Washington on September 25, 2025, at the age of 79.

== See also ==
- List of law clerks for the sixth seat of the Supreme Court of the United States
