= James Tanner (disambiguation) =

James Tanner (born 1976) is an English chef and television personality.

James Tanner may also refer to:

- James C. Tanner (1926–2019), American journalist
- James R. Tanner (1844–1927), American soldier and civil servant
- James Mourilyan Tanner (1920–2010), British paediatric endocrinologist
- James T. Tanner (1858–1915), English stage director and dramatist
- James Tanner (singer), contestant on The X Factor
- Jim Tanner, sports and entertainment agent
- Gid Tanner (James Gideon Tanner, 1885–1960), American old-time fiddler
