= Colonial Theater (Allentown, Pennsylvania) =

Former movie theater

- Colonial Theater in October 1962
- Interactive map of Colonial Theater
- Address: 513-17 West Hamilton Street; Allentown, Pennsylvania, 18101; United States
- Coordinates: 40°36′12″N 075°28′07″W
- Type: Theater

Construction
- Opened: 1920
- Closed: 1982
- Demolished: 2005
- Rebuilt: 1963

The Colonial Theater was a cinema and stage theater in Allentown, Pennsylvania, United States. Opened in 1920, for over 50 years it was considered the glamour cinema in the central business district. It closed in 1982, and was torn down in 2005 after years of being vacant and deteriorated. The site has been redeveloped as Three City Center, part of the Allentown Neighborhood Improvement Zone (NIZ).

== History ==
=== 19th century ===
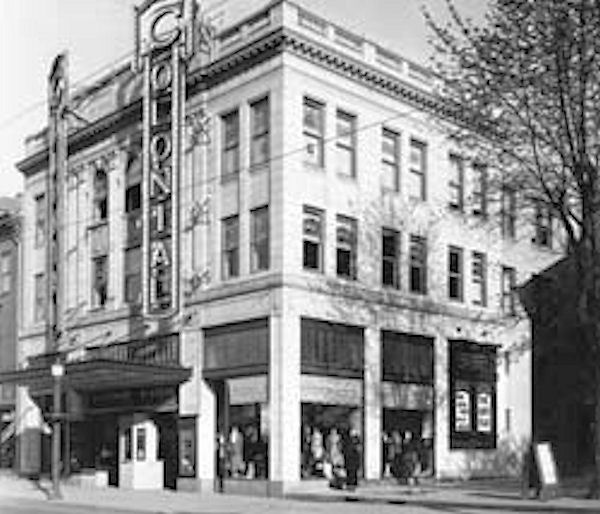
The Colonial Theater in 1921

The Colonial Theater was built on the site of a Center City Allentown mansion owned by John Dodson Stiles, a lawyer who represented Pennsylvania's 7th congressional district in the U.S. House of Representatives during the Civil War.

In the 1870s, Stiles returned to Allentown, where he practiced law until his death in 1896. Two years later, in 1898, his home was remodeled by his son, Charles Frederick (Fred) Stiles, who turned it into the Hotel Hamilton.

=== 20th century ===
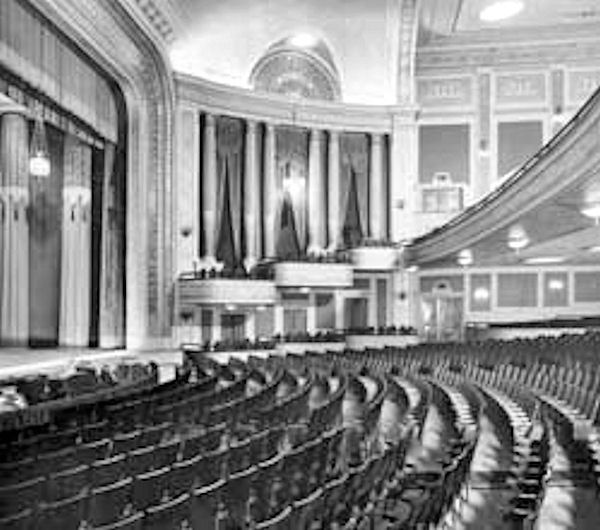
The theater's main auditorium

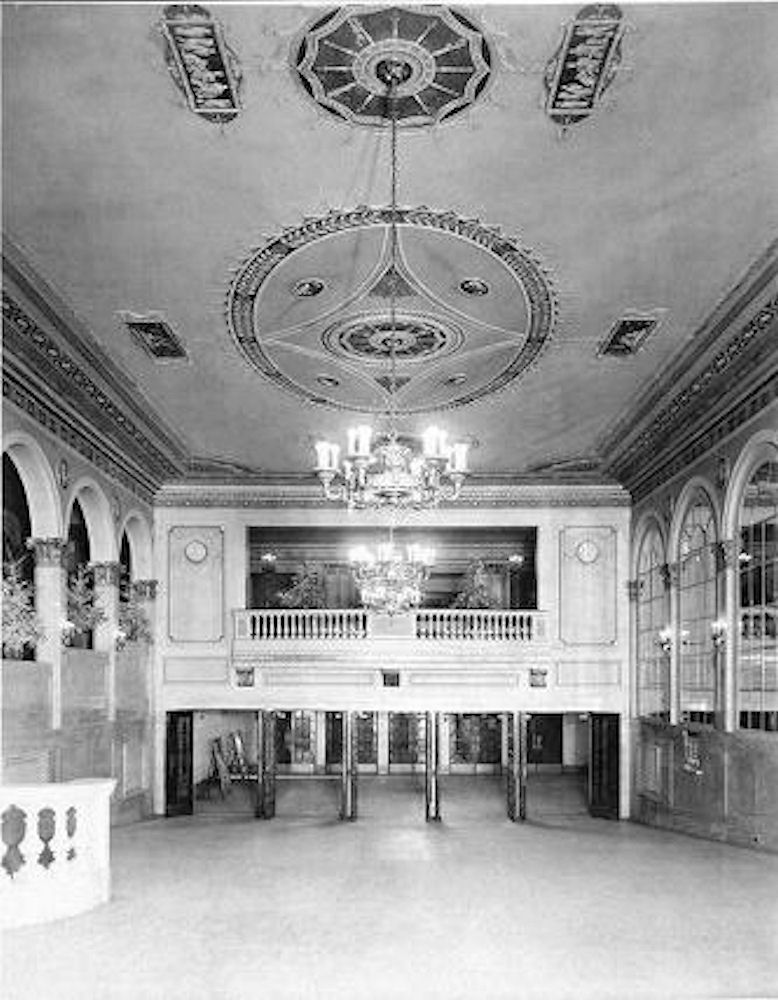
The interior of the theater in 1964 following its extensive renovations

During World War I, the Hotel Hamilton suffered a devastating fire. The hotel was later razed, which opened a prime real estate lot on Hamilton Street in Center City Allentown. The location for the new theater was near the Old Lehigh County Courthouse and a short walk up the street from the Allentown trolley station at 6th and Hamilton streets. The Hotel Hamilton had served as a gathering place for Lehigh County's legal minds and travelers since its opening, which made it an appealing place for an entertainment venue.

In 1919, after the end of a shortage of building materials during World War I, the Colonial Theater was constructed. The theatre was owned by Sidney Wilmer and Walter Vincent, both from Utica, New York. The two had owned the Orpheum Theater in Allentown since 1906. In 1920, the Orpheum was renamed The State Theater when it switched from a vaudeville venue to a film venue. Under Wilmer and Vincent's ownership, the Orpheum was profitable. Given its success, the two sought to open a second theater in the city.

The Ochs Construction Company from Allentown was the general contractor for the building. The Colonial was designed by Philadelphia architects Hoffman and Henon, who were producing illustrations for major motion picture theaters around the nation. The building was a concrete and steel three-story building in Beaux-Arts style. Wilmer and Vincent wanted this to be primarily a movie theater and not a vaudeville house.

The interior had a three-story auditorium with two balconies. The marble used was rose Tavernell imported from France. The three grand chandeliers lit the long center ramp that swept up to the interior doors. Set in the marble arches of the columns were baskets of flowers, gifts from Wilmer's and Vincent's many clients in the theater world.

The theater also had ground-floor retail shops and second and third-story professional offices, which were leased to law firms, insurance agents, and other small businesses, including rehearsal rooms that were used by musicians and acting troupes.

The Colonial held its opening night on October 11, 1920. The first film shown at the theater was The Idol Dancer by D.W. Griffith. Also on the bill was a Pathe newsreel and a comedy, High and Dizzy, starring silent screen favorite Harold Lloyd. Matinee prices for the orchestra and balcony seats were 25 cents, but box seats on Saturday evening would be 65 cents, a high price by the standards of the time.

For most of the next five decades, the Colonial was one of the most profitable and popular theaters in Allentown. Although designed primarily for the presentation of films, it also occasionally served as a performing arts theater.

The theater also hosted traveling jazz shows, including touring groups from Harlem's Cotton Club. In 1929, the theater installed sound equipment for talking pictures. In February 1935, it was the site of a live national radio broadcast of Amos and Andy.

It was remodeled in 1937; seats were added, new projection equipment installed and a new air conditioning system put in place. The following year, in 1938, Walter Vincent was chairman of the board of Republic Pictures, a Hollywood film studio Vincent made a film about the city, Allentown On Parade, which premiered in Allentown on August 18, 1938, along with a Republic Pictures' romance film, Army Girl. Before a capacity crowd on the flag-draped stage of the Colonial Theater, a coast-to-coast phone conversation between Allentown community leaders and the stars of "Army Girl" was broadcast throughout the theater. In an era when a cross-country phone call was costly and not widely available, hearing the live voices of Hollywood stars was quite an event. In 1944, the property was sold to Fabian Theaters, Inc., which operated a chain of thirty theaters in New York and New Jersey.

After World War II, the Colonial gradually became a cinema-only facility; however, it continued to host an occasional stage show until the 1960s. The emergence of television in the 1950s caused revenues to decline as more and more people began to stay home and watch entertainment in their living rooms. In 1954, the theater's screen was replaced with one capable of showing CinemaScope widescreen films.

In the early 1960s, the theater was closed for a major renovation. Its front facade was cleaned and painted, the lower facade retiled, and a new marquee was installed. The interior was fitted with new theater seats, new carpeting, and which were installed on the first floor along with new carpeting and gold and blue draperies; the walls were re-plastered and a new ceiling was installed. Two new lounges were added to the main floor and a new RCA stereo sound system was added. The grand opening in October 1962 was the film Barabbas.

During the 1960 and early 1970s, the Colonial was the premiere theater in Center City Allentown, showing such films as Cleopatra; Mary Poppins; Doctor Zhivago; Guess Who's Coming to Dinner; Midnight Cowboy (The only "X" rated film ever shown there); M*A*S*H; The Godfather, and The Godfather Part II.

In 1973, United Artists Eastern Theaters Inc. purchased the building from the Fabian movie chain. However, during the 1970s and 1980s, the multi-cinema mall theaters and also the decline of the Allentown Central Shopping district on Hamilton Street led to austere times for the Colonial, along with other Hamilton Street theaters in Allentown.

In the late 1970s, the Rialto Theater at 10th and Hamilton Streets closed, and the Eric Twin, which opened in 1969 about a block east, was renovated into a multi-cinema of six screens, all of which were capable of projecting 70mm films, while the Colonial was a single-screen capable of only 35mm film projection. This meant that many of the Hollywood blockbuster films of the era were shown at other theaters.

By the mid-1970s, the theater was largely showing second and third-run films.

On September 23, 1982, the theater cinema part of the building was closed, though professional and retail offices remained open.

After announcing the closure, the Colonial announced that the closure was only temporary until a new owner could be found. Negotiations with several cinema chains fell through, however, and the theater remained closed for several years.

In 1988, the property was sold to Mark Mendleson, an investor from Philadelphia. In the time while it was closed, the building sustained water damage from a leaking roof. Again in need of renovation and losing money, Mendleson closed the building for "temporary repairs" that shuttered the professional offices and retail space.

Instead of renovating the property, however, property records show that in spite of their inactivity and deterioration, the Colonial and other properties owned by Mendleson, were used as collateral to obtain tens of millions of dollars in loans for Mendleson's other projects. The closed theater, judged as viable as an operable business by the City of Allentown in 1987, began to structurally deteriorate. Mendelson, in turn, laid the blame for his troubles on the city's economic woes and city officials, who he said "tortured: him with unfulfilled promises and turned their backs when he needed help.

For the better part of the next 15 years, Mendleson and the City of Allentown were at loggerheads with regards to the Colonial and his other properties, all of which were deteriorating.

In 1990, when Allentown gained was infamously named at the very bottom of Money magazine's ranking of 300 places to live in the United States, the magazine used the Colonial Theater to illustrate the city's downfall in a single photograph, captioned "A vacant movie theater in Allentown".

In 1994, with nearly $5 million in liens against his properties in Allentown, the Colonial went to a tax sale. Mendelson gambled that no one would bid on the property — thus becoming responsible for the unpaid bills — and won. At that time, Mendelson began to make amends by paying some of the Colonial's back taxes.

=== 21st century ===
The Colonial Theater on December 9th, 2001, showing its derelict condition after a decade of neglect. The theater was torn down in 2005.

Colonial Theater's interior on March 5, 2005, illustrating the deterioriated condition of the theater, which was deemed as unsalvagable, was torn down

In 2001, the City of Allentown ordered the Colonial Theater sealed to keep vagrants out of the property, and Mendleson was ordered to repair its roof and make other structural repairs due to the deterioration of the property and to prevent structural collapse. The city fought for years to take control of the long-blighted theater, and obtained a court order in 2003, prying it from the grip of the Mendelson Family Trust.

In March 2005, the Colonial Theater was demolished by the city. long with the Colonial theater building, the city also razed some vacant early 20th century buildings known as the Colonial Annex, and the former Allentown Trust building at 527 Hamilton Street, which were next to the former theater building. Once one of the city's largest banks, it was built about 1905. In June 1931, the bank had 12,000 depositors and $1 million in assets. The run on the banks during the Great Depression forced the bank into closure. In June 1932, the bank was taken over by the Commonwealth of Pennsylvania. The building was then used for many years afterwards as offices for Lehigh County until it was shuttered in 1988.

With the demolition of the vacant properties, a large empty lot was created between Old Lehigh County Courthouse on Hamilton Street and Law Street. The city then graveled over the empty lots and the land remained vacant for several years.

The Colonial Theater faced legal issues for several years, until 2008, when the Mendleson Trust settled its dispute with the city over the value of the seized property and payment of city tax liens on that and other properties connected to Mendelson.

Once the settlement was reached, the large empty lot on the north side of Hamilton Street was placed for sale by the city. In July 2013, following several attempts by the city to sell the vacant lot to several developers, an agreement was made to sell the property to the City Center Development Corporation.

In April 2014, the City Center Development Corporation announced that construction had begun on Three City Center, a seven-story, $50 million office and retail building on the former Colonial theater and Allentown Trust Company sites. The Three City Center building is a five-story building that includes 110,000 square feet of retail and office space. It was designed to blend in with surrounding architecture and has two fronts, one on the 500 block of Hamilton Street and the other facing the city's Arts Park.

In May 2015, Three City Center opened.

== See also ==
- List of historic places in Allentown, Pennsylvania
