= Newdow v. Carey =

2010 US federal court case

Newdow v. Rio Linda USD
- Court: United States Court of Appeals for the Ninth Circuit
- Full case name: Dr. Michael A. Newdow, et al. v. Rio Linda Union School District, et al.
- Argued: December 4 2007
- Decided: March 11 2010

Holding
- The teacher-led recitation of the Pledge of Allegiance to the Flag of the United States of America that includes the phrase "under God" by students in public schools does not constitute an establishment of religion prohibited by the United States Constitution.

Court membership
- Judges sitting: Dorothy Wright Nelson, Stephen Reinhardt, Carlos Bea

Case opinions
- Majority: Bea, joined by Nelson
- Dissent: Reinhardt

Newdow v. Rio Linda Union School District (also known as Newdow v. Carey), Nos. 05–17257, 05–17344, and 06–15093, was a United States Court of Appeals for the Ninth Circuit decision that upheld the constitutionality of the teacher-led recitation of the Pledge of Allegiance by students in public schools. The 2–1 majority found that the recitation did not constitute an establishment of religion prohibited by the United States Constitution.

It was an appeal from the Eastern District of California, which ruled that the recitation of the Pledge of Allegiance in public school is unconstitutional based on the Ninth Circuit's ruling that the words "under God" violate the Establishment Clause of the United States Constitution in Newdow v. United States Congress in 2002. That case was later appealed to the U.S. Supreme Court and overturned on an issue of standing in Elk Grove Unified School District v. Newdow in 2004.

In the new case, the plaintiffs were three unnamed families. The defendants were Rio Linda Union School District, the United States as a Defendant-Intervenor and a group of defendant-intervenors, including lead intervenor John Carey, who sought to preserve the current wording of the Pledge. The private defendant-intervenors were represented by the Becket Fund for Religious Liberty. The Court of Appeals consolidated the defendants' three different appeals for briefing and argument.

The Court heard oral argument in the case on December 4, 2007, where the petitioner Michael Newdow argued for plaintiffs. Deputy Assistant Attorney General Gregory Katsas argued for the United States, Terence Cassidy argued for the Rio Linda Union School District, and Kevin Hasson of the Becket Fund argued for the private intervenor-defendants. A decision was handed down on March 11, 2010.

Oral Argument
