= Becket (law firm) =

U.S. nonprofit organization

Becket Fund for Religious Liberty
- Headquarters: 1900 Pennsylvania Avenue NW, Washington, D.C. 20006
- Major practice areas: Religious freedom and other First Amendment cases
- Key people: Mark Rienzi (president and CEO)
- Revenue: $18.8 million (2024)
- Date founded: 1994
- Founder: Kevin Hasson
- Company type: Non-profit organization
- Website: becketfund.org

Becket, also known as the Becket Fund for Religious Liberty, is a non-profit public interest law firm based in Washington, D.C., with a mission to "protect the free expression of all faiths." Becket promotes accommodationism and is active in the judicial system, the media, and in education. Becket has an undefeated record at the Supreme Court of the United States, having won 13 consecutive cases since 2012.

== History and leadership ==
The Becket Fund for Religious Liberty was founded in 1994 by Kevin Hasson, a lawyer who previously worked in the Reagan Administration Justice Department under Samuel Alito, then-Assistant Attorney General and current U.S. Supreme Court Justice. Subsequently, Hasson worked at the Washington law firm Williams & Connolly, where he became well-known and controversial for defending Catholic University's decision to fire Charles Curran for his opposition to Church doctrine despite his being a respected moral theologian.

Hasson, who is Catholic, named The Becket Fund after Saint Thomas Becket, who was the Archbishop of Canterbury from 1162 to 1170 during the reign of Henry II of England. A long series of quarrels with King Henry ended with Becket's murder and martyrdom at Canterbury Cathedral in 1170. His last words were an acceptance of death in defense of the church of Christ.

In 2011, Hasson stepped down as president of Becket, making way for William P. Mumma, who has since served as the president and chairman of the board. Kristina Arriaga, who was the executive director of Becket starting in 2010 and a member of the firm since 1995, is now a senior advisor to the board. Montse Alvarado, who started with Becket in 2009, replaced Arriaga as executive director in 2017. Mark Rienzi now serves as president and CEO of Becket.

In 2021, the law firm reported having 63 employees and revenue of about $11.2 million, up from $7.5 million in 2020. In 2014, the law firm had eleven litigating attorneys, and an estimated budget of five million dollars. The firm operates as a non-profit.

== Supreme Court cases ==
Becket has served as counsel at the Supreme Court for thirteen religious freedom cases since 2012, starting with Hosanna-Tabor v. EEOC (2012). In Hosanna-Tabor, the Supreme Court unanimously ruled (9–0) in favor of the ministerial exception doctrine for the first time, which exempts religious institutions from anti-discrimination laws in hiring its "ministers".

They also served as counsel to the plaintiffs in Burwell v. Hobby Lobby Stores, Inc. (2014) in their fight to exempt themselves from having to pay for four different drugs and devices they deemed as abortifacients. The court ruled 5–4 in favor of Hobby Lobby, asserting that family owned businesses have a right to operate in accordance with their conscience.

Becket also litigated Holt v. Hobbs (2015) at the Supreme Court. A Muslim inmate in the Arkansas prison system wanted to grow a beard according to his faith. When he was denied his request he wrote a petition to the Supreme Court asking to hear his case. The Court agreed to take on the case and Becket represented Holt, citing that the denial of the plaintiff's right to grow his beard according to his faith is a clear violation of the Religious Land Use and Institutionalized Persons Act. The Supreme Court would later unanimously rule in support of Holt. Becket served as counsel to the Little Sisters of the Poor in Little Sisters of the Poor Saints Peter and Paul Home v. Pennsylvania (2020). That same term, Becket represented Our Lady of Guadalupe School in Our Lady of Guadalupe School v. Morrissey-Berru (2020).

Becket has also filed petitions to the Supreme Court in two cases involving the United States Department of Health and Human Services' contraceptive mandate on employer-paid health insurance coverage of contraception, which had at the time been consolidated into Zubik v. Burwell, Little Sisters of the Poor v. Burwell, and Houston Baptist University and East Baptist University v. Burwell.

In 2021, Becket litigated at the Supreme Court Fulton v. City of Philadelphia (2021). In a 9–0 ruling, the Court held that the City of Philadelphia could not refuse to contract with Catholic Social Services (CSS) because of CSS's rejection of same-sex couples as foster parents, a violation of the city's non-discrimination requirements.

In 2025, Becket litigated Catholic Charities Bureau v. Wisconsin (2025). The Supreme Court ruled in a 9–0 decision that Wisconsin's denial to give an unemployment tax exemption was unconstitutional because it discriminated against religious organizations based on their religious activities.

== Other litigation activities ==
Becket has represented groups and persons from many different religious traditions; its founder, Kevin Hasson, claims that Becket defends the "religious rights of people from 'A to Z,' from Anglicans to Zoroastrians." Previous clients also included the City of Cranston in the attempt to preserve the Prayer Banner at Cranston High School West.

In 1997, the Rigdon v. Perry case set a precedent that the military could not ban chaplains from following the directives of their religious leaders.

In 2010, Becket represented Sacramento-area public school students who sought to continue reciting the current form of the Pledge of Allegiance (including the words "under God") in Newdow v. Carey, the second case brought by Michael Newdow seeking to remove the words "under God" from the Pledge of Allegiance. Becket also represented intervenors in the challenge to the Pledge of Allegiance in Hanover, New Hampshire public schools. Both cases were resolved in favor of the current Pledge language.

In 2012, Becket represented a mosque in Murfreesboro, Tennessee, that was denied the right to use its building by a local court after complaints that the mosque was promoting terrorism. Becket has also litigated on behalf of prisoners who seek to continue following their beliefs in prison. Becket has sought to ensure that observant Jewish prisoners are provided with kosher food in every prison in the United States. In the case of Moussazadeh v. Texas Department of Criminal Justice, the United States Court of Appeals for the Fifth Circuit affirmed the right of a Jewish prisoner to receive kosher food in a Texas prison.

From 2016 to 2019, Becket represented Lehigh County, Pennsylvania when it was sued by the Madison, Wisconsin based atheist advocacy organization Freedom From Religion Foundation for having a cross on its County seal and flag. Edward G. Smith, a federal judge with the United States District Court for the Eastern District of Pennsylvania in Philadelphia, citing the 1971 case of Lemon v. Kurtzman ruled that the addition of a cross on the county's seal was unconstitutional in 2017, but the County appealed the decision. In 2019 the United States Court of Appeals for the Third Circuit in Philadelphia, citing American Legion v. American Humanist Association, a ruling earlier that year, ruled that the presence of a cross in the County seal did not violate the constitution since it commemorated the history of Lehigh County.

In 2022, the firm began representing Yeshiva University, a Modern Orthodox Jewish university in New York City, in a case where undergraduate students sued the university for refusing to recognize an LGBTQ student group. A New York court ruled that the university must recognize the undergraduate Pride Alliance in June, 2022; the university appealed to the U.S. Supreme Court in an attempt to block the ruling in August 2022.

Another significant area of litigation for Becket has been land use by religious organizations. Becket brought the first case under the Religious Land Use and Institutionalized Persons Act, and has been involved with such litigation throughout the United States.

In 2021, Becket began representing the Apache Stronghold, a group of Arizona Apaches who sued the United States government to prevent the opening of a Copper Mine in Oak Flat, Arizona, a location sacred to Apaches. In September 2024, Becket petitioned the U.S. Supreme Court to overturn an appellate court ruling allowing the federal government to build a copper mine on an Apache worship site. Becket argues that the government would be violating the First Amendment's guarantee of freedom of religion if the mine is developed. If a mine is built, it will create a crater two miles wide and 1,000 feet deep that would destroy the Apache worship site located in the Oak Flat Campground.

While Becket typically litigates in favor of religious liberty claims, it occasionally intervenes in favor of the state to oppose free exercise challenges. One example came when Jewish plaintiffs challenged Indiana's restrictive abortion statutes after Dobbs v. Jackson Women's Health Organization, claiming that Indiana's laws limiting abortion infringed on Jewish religious belief (which the plaintiffs contended require that abortion be available in most or all situations). In contrast to their normally broad defense of religious liberty claimants, Becket here argued that the Jewish plaintiffs, who had won a preliminary challenge in lower court, were "insincere" in their stated religious beliefs and that even if their religious beliefs were sincere Indiana was justified in overriding them to protect "innocent life".

== International activities ==
Becket has represented Muslim clients in the European Court of Human Rights, and assisted in pre-litigation and litigation in Europe, Asia, and Australia.
