= Rita Braver =

American journalist

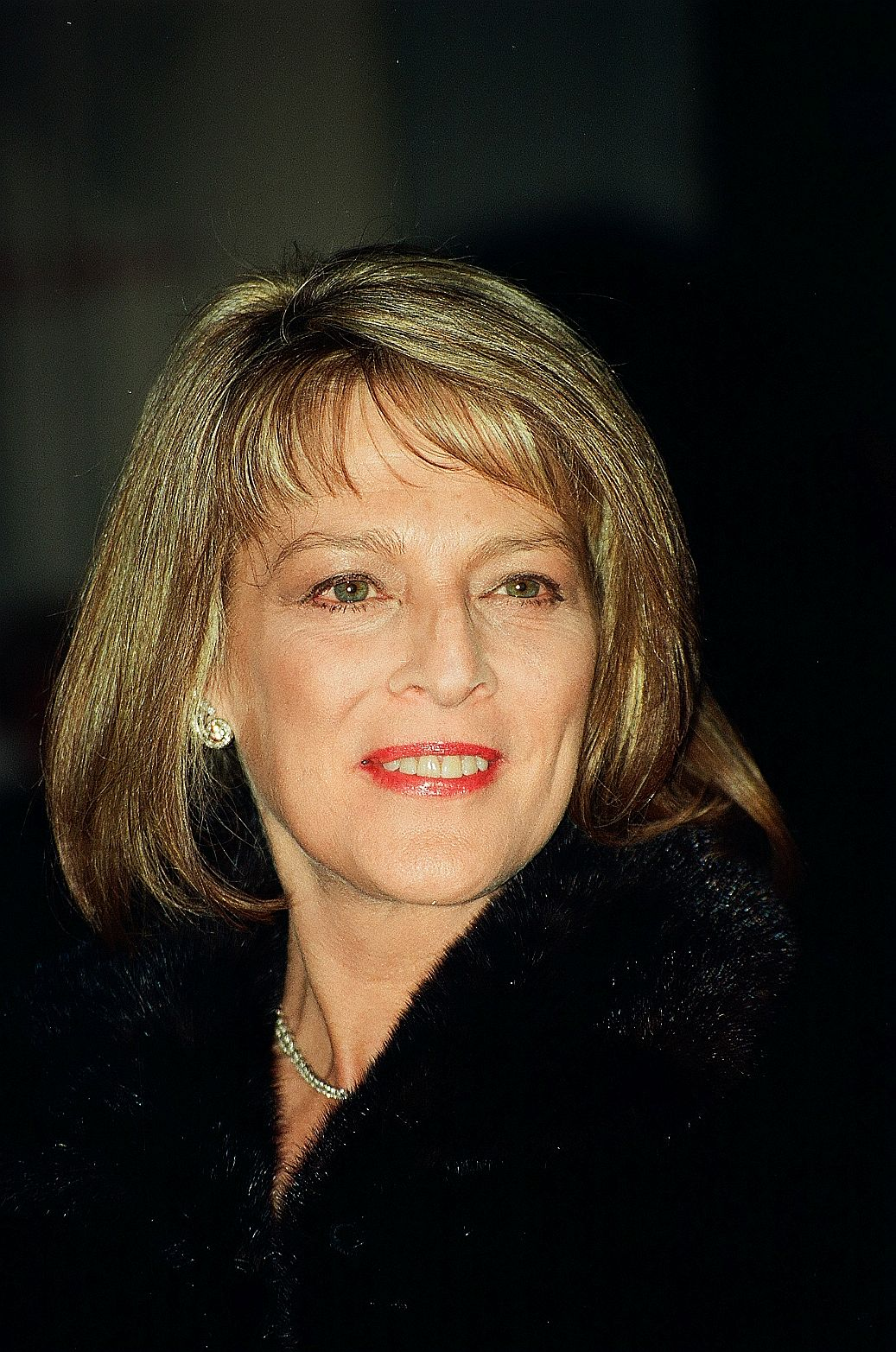
- Born: Rita Lynn Braver; April 12, 1948 (age 78)
- Education: University of Wisconsin (BA)
- Occupation: News correspondent
- Spouse: Robert B. Barnett (m. 1972; died 2025)
- Children: 1

Rita Braver (born April 12, 1948) is an American retired television news correspondent. She worked with CBS News, and is best known for her investigative journalism of White House scandals such as the Iran-Contra affair.

== Life and career ==
Rita Lynn Braver was born to a Jewish family on April 12, 1948, and raised in Silver Spring, Maryland. Her father died while she was a teenager. She has two sisters: Bettie Braver Sugar and Sharon Braver Cohen. She graduated from the University of Wisconsin-Madison with a degree in political science, and spent a few years at WWL-TV in New Orleans as a copy girl before moving to Washington, D.C., with her husband and joining CBS in 1972 as a producer.

From 1983–1993, Braver served as CBS News's chief law correspondent. She broke the story of the John Walker spy ring, as well as that of another spy, Jonathan Pollard. She also led CBS's coverage of the Iran-Contra affair. She served as CBS's chief White House correspondent during Bill Clinton's first term, and since 1998 was a chief national correspondent for Sunday Morning.

She retired from CBS News on March 30, 2025.

== Personal life ==
On April 10, 1972, Braver married Washington, D.C., lawyer Robert B. Barnett (1946–2025) whom she met in college. They have a daughter, Meredith Jane Barnett (born 1978), who married Daniel Ross Penn in a Jewish ceremony in Washington D.C. on April 6, 2008.
