= Mary-Rose Papandrea =

American Constitutional Law Professor

Professor Mary-Rose Papandrea
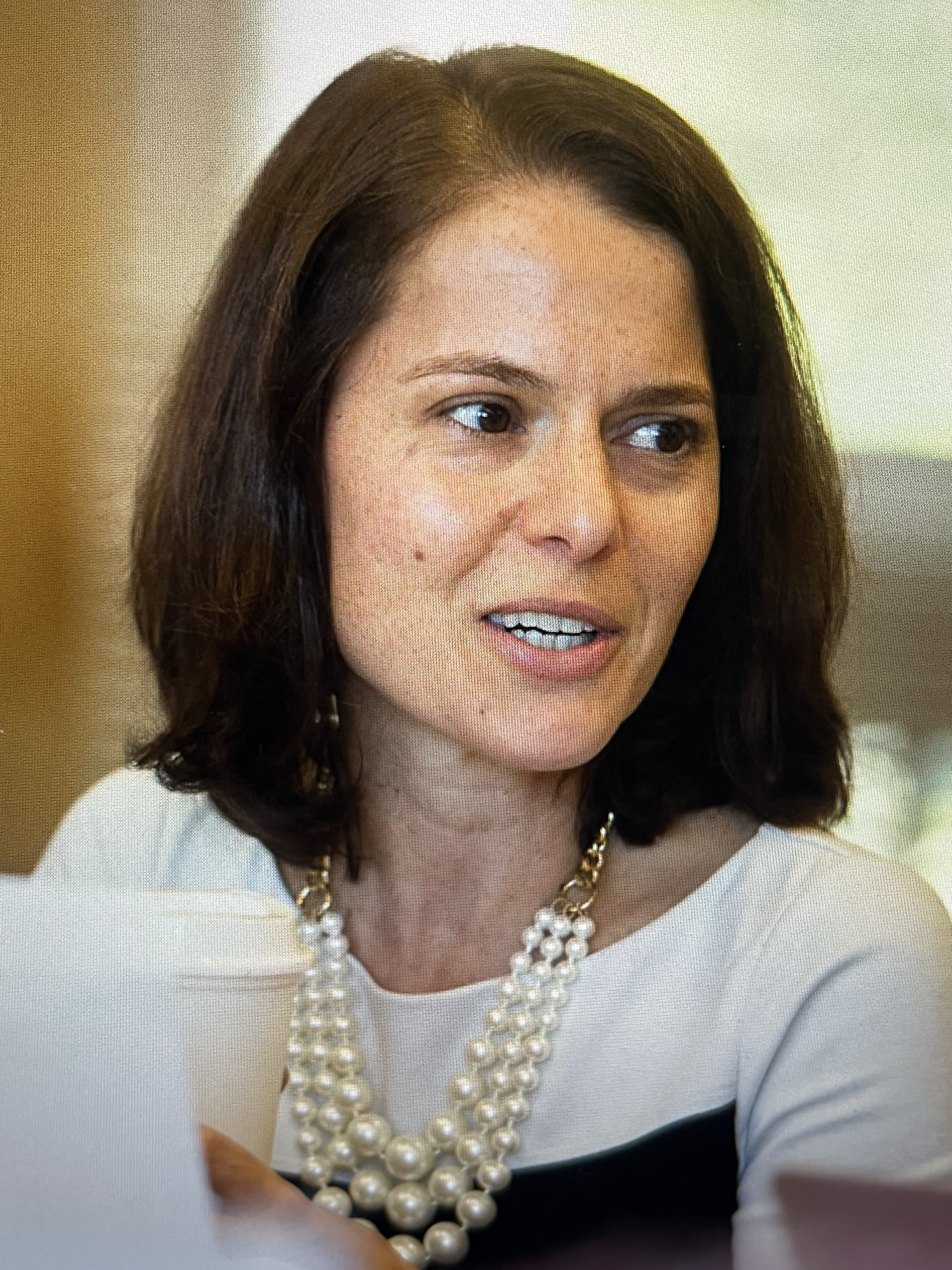
- Citizenship: United States of America
- Education: Yale College
- Alma mater: Chicago Law School
- Occupations: Academic; Professor
- Years active: 1995 - present
- Employer: George Washington University
- Title: Inaugural Holder of the Burchfield Professorship of First Amendment and Free Speech Law
- Website: https://www.law.gwu.edu/mary-rose-papandrea

Mary-Rose Papandrea is an academic and professor best-known for her work in media and constitutional law.

== Education ==
In 1992, Papandrea graduated from Yale College cum laude with her bachelors degree in Humanities. She then attended the University of Chicago Law School, served as the Topics & Comments Editor of the Chicago Law Review, and obtained her J.D. degree in 1995 with High Honors and Order of the Coif.

== Career ==
Before entering into the world of academia, Papandrea was a law clerk for Associate Justice David H. Souter of the United States Supreme Court. She also clerked for Judge Douglas Ginsburg of the U.S. Court of Appeals for the D.C. Circuit and Judge John G. Koeltl of the U.S. District Court for the Southern District of New York. Additionally, she practiced law at Williams & Connolly, LLP in Washington D.C, where she litigated cases involving privacy, defamation, and employment claims.

Papandrea began her career as a professor at the Boston College Law School. Then, for over a decade, she served as the Samuel Ashe Distinguished Professor of Constitutional Law at the University of North Carolina School of Law, where she was also the associate dean for academic affairs, the Judge John J. Parker Distinguished Professor of Law, and the faculty advisor for the university’s annual First Amendment Law Review symposia. Also while at UNC, she led the university’s strategic initiative “Promote Democracy” and received the Charles E. Daye Award for Excellence in Service and the Professor S. Elizabeth Gibson Award for Faculty Excellence. Papandrea is now the Inaugural Holder of the Burchfield Professorship of First Amendment and Free Speech Law at the George Washington University Law School.

Papandrea has had her articles published across several law schools, including Stanford University, Duke University, and the University of Chicago, in addition to co-writing a textbook entitled Media and the Law, Second Edition. She has also spoken and moderated at conferences, podcasts, and events throughout the United States on a range of topics, primarily the First Amendment of the United States Constitution, national security, and citizen journalism: the Practising Law Institute Communications Law in the Digital Age conference series, the University of North Carolina School of Law's annual First Amendment Law Review Symposium, and Slate's Amicus podcast, to name a few.

Additionally, Papandrea is an elected member of the American Law Institute and an advisor to the ALI’s Third Restatement of Torts: Defamation and Privacy. She served as the Chair of the American Association of Law Schools Mass Media Law and National Security Law sections and remains on the Executive Committee of both sections, as well as a member of the Editorial Board for the Journal of National Security Law & Policy.

== Selected works ==
Scholarship

- “Citizen Journalism and the Reporter’s Privilege," Minnesota Law Review 91 (2007), Boston College Law School Research Paper No. 110.
- “Social Media, Public School Teachers, and the First Amendment," North Carolina Law Review 90 (2012), Boston College Law School Legal Studies Research Paper No. 267.
- “Student Speech Rights in the Digital Age," Florida Law Review 60 (2008), 1027–1102, Boston College Law School Legal Studies Research Paper No. 149.
- The Story of New York Times Co. v. Sullivan," in First Amendment Stories, ed. Richard W. Garnett and Andrew Koppelman (New York: Thomson Reuters/Foundation Press, 2012), pp. 229–263; Boston College Law School Legal Studies Research Paper No. 269.
- “Lapdogs, Watchdogs, and Scapegoats: The Press and National Security Information," Indiana Law Journal 83 (2008), Boston College Law School Research Paper No. 133.
- “Under Attack: The Public’s Right to Know and the War on Terror” (2005), Boston College Law School Legal Studies Research Paper No. 51
- “The End of Balancing? Text, History & Tradition in First Amendment Speech Cases After Bruen," Duke Journal of Constitutional Law & Public Policy 18 (2023), UNC Legal Studies Research Paper No. 4277611 (with Clay Calvert).
- “The Free Speech Rights of University Students," Minnesota Law Review 101 (2017), 1801–1862.
- “Leaker Traitor Whistleblower Spy: National Security Leaks and the First Amendment," Boston University Law Review 94 (2014).
- “The Great Unfulfilled Promise of Tinker," Virginia Law Review Online 105 (2019), 159–176, UNC Legal Studies Research Paper.
- “The Free Speech Rights of Off-Duty Government Employees," Brigham Young University Law Review 2010, no. 6 (2011), Boston College Law School Legal Studies Research Paper.
- “Money, Money, Money: Universities, Government Funding, and Academic Freedom," GWU Legal Studies Research Paper No. 2025-59; GWU Law School Public Law Research Paper No. 2025-59.
