= Flag and seal of Lehigh County, Pennsylvania =

Flag

Flag of Lehigh County
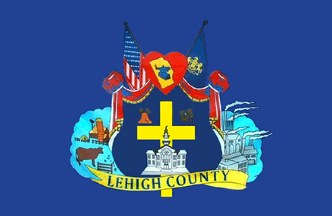
- Use: County of Lehigh
- Adopted: December 28, 1944
- Design: County seal on a blue field

Seal of Lehigh County
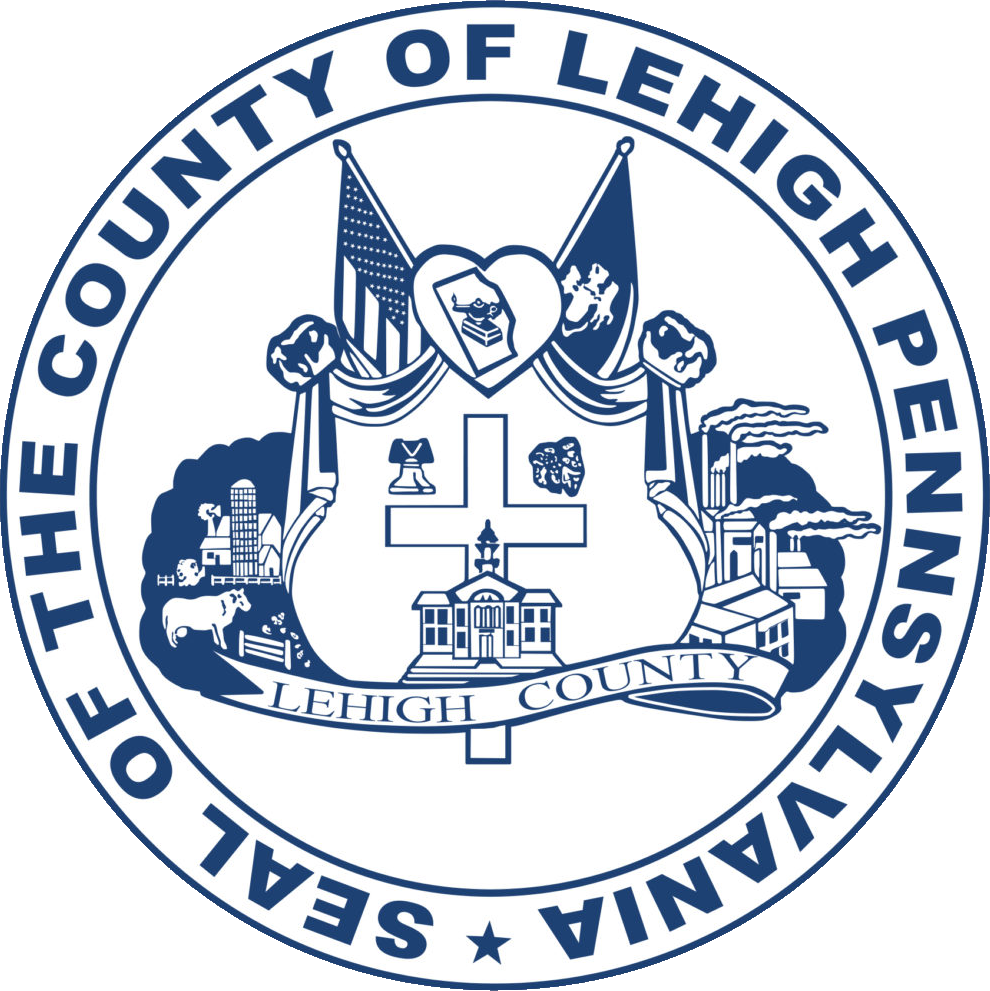
- Adopted: December 28, 1944
- Crest: Flag of the United States and the Flag of Pennsylvania crossed
- Torse: A heart with outline of Lehigh County surmounted by an oil lamp
- Shield: Old Lehigh County Courthouse surmounted on a golden cross, a Bison, and the Liberty Bell
- Supporters: Farms and factories

The flag of Lehigh County in Pennsylvania features the county's seal atop a blue field.

The county seal of features the Old Lehigh County Courthouse surmounted on a golden cross, representing Lehigh County's first Christian settlers. On the cross's right is a bison, representing the Trexler Nature Preserve, where the animals graze. On the cross's left is the Liberty Bell, which was hidden in Allentown, the county seat of Lehigh County, for nine months in 1777 following the fall of Philadelphia during the Revolutionary War.

Supporting the seal, to the right, are factories, and, to the left, are farms; both represent historical economic foundations of Lehigh County. Above the seal is the flag of the United States and the flag of Pennsylvania crossed and surmounted by the red heart of Allentown, which includes an outline of Lehigh County surmounted by an oil lamp, an Allentown symbol.

== History ==
=== Unsuccessful court challenge ===
On November 5, 2015, Freedom From Religion Foundation, a Madison, Wisconsin-based atheist advocacy organization, demanded that Lehigh County redesign the seal and the flag, citing a violation of their freedom of religion and First Amendment rights and previous court rulings the organization had received elsewhere, including court-ordered removal of an ichthys on Republic, Missouri's seal and the removal of a cross on the seals of Zion, Illinois, La Mesa, California, and Edmond, Oklahoma. The organization stated, "We urge the County to immediately discontinue using this seal and to develop a new seal that is both constitutional and representative of all citizens."

Lehigh County's council responded with a unanimous vote asserting that the seal would not be changed. A letter sent to the foundation from the county stated that the seal was strictly secular and represented the historical settling of Lehigh County by Christian groups. In August 2016, the foundation sued the county, and the county retained Becket Law for their defense. The county reiterated the secular nature of the cross, stating that "The cross, one of more than a dozen elements, was included to honor the original settlers of Lehigh County, who were Christian."

In September 2017, Edward G. Smith, a federal judge with the United States District Court for the Eastern District of Pennsylvania in Philadelphia, ruled that the addition of a cross on the county's seal was unconstitutional and that the county needed to modify it. In his ruling, Smith stated that, while he did not believe the cross itself was unconstitutional, an earlier precedent in the 1971 case of Lemon v. Kurtzman mandated it.

In response to the federal court ruling, in a 6-3 county council vote, the county again asserted that it would not cease using the county seal and appealed the ruling to the United States Court of Appeals for the Third Circuit in Philadelphia. In August 2019, citing American Legion v. American Humanist Association, a ruling earlier that year, the appeals court determined that the presence of a cross in the county seal did not violate the constitution since it commemorated the history of Lehigh County.

The Freedom from Religion Foundation did not appeal the ruling by the Third Circuit Court of Appeals, the case was closed, and the cross remains on the Lehigh County flag.
