= Rigdon v. Perry =

1997 United States court case

Rigdon v. Perry was a 1997 United States case brought by the Becket Fund for Religious Freedom. It set a precedent that the military could not ban chaplains from following the directives of their religious leaders.

The case originated with a military ban on preaching on pending federal legislation by chaplains. Rigdon, a Catholic priest, as well as an Orthodox Jewish rabbi both wanted to preach in favor of passage of the partial-birth abortion ban on 1997. They brought a suit on First Amendment and Religious Freedom Restoration Act grounds against the federal government ban on them doing so.

The case eventually also involved Muslim chaplains, and the Washington, D.C. district court found that the government had acted in an unjustified and heavy-handed manner.

== Sources ==
- Becket Fund article on Rigdon v. Perry
