= Kevin Hasson =

American non-profit executive, founder of Becket (law firm)

- Education: University of Notre Dame; Notre Dame Law School
- Known for: Founder and president emeritus of Becket

Kevin J. "Seamus" Hasson is founder and president emeritus of Becket, a non-profit, public interest law firm that represents persons of all faiths. The Becket Fund is well known for successfully representing the Little Sisters of the Poor in the U.S. Supreme Court. The firm also successfully represented Hobby Lobby in Burwell v. Hobby Lobby Stores, Inc., in which the Supreme Court held that protections under the Religious Freedom Restoration Act applied to closely held corporations. The Becket Fund also secured a victory in EEOC v. Hosanna Tabor, which the Wall Street Journal called one of "the most important religious liberty cases in half a century."

Prior to his retirement, Hasson lectured and debated in a wide variety of venues, including The University of Oxford, the Vatican, Harvard Law School, and Stanford Law School. He holds honorary doctorates from several universities, including The Catholic University of America, Ave Maria University, and his alma mater, the University of Notre Dame. Hasson currently serves as a trustee at the University of Dallas.

Hasson has been quoted in the New York Times, the Washington Post, the Wall Street Journal, the Christian Science Monitor, USA Today, and U.S. News & World Report, as well as in regional media outlets from the Los Angeles Times to the Chicago Tribune to the Philadelphia Inquirer. He has appeared on broadcast news programs including the Today Show, Dateline NBC, Fox & Friends, NPR, CNN, and Al-Jazeera. While serving as President of the Becket Fund, Hasson met with religious and world leaders across the globe, such as Pope John Paul II, the Dalai Lama, and Elie Wiesel.

Before founding the Becket Fund in 1994, Hasson was an attorney at Williams & Connolly in Washington D.C., where he focused on religious liberty litigation. From 1986 to 1987, he served in the Office of Legal Counsel at the Justice Department where he advised the White House and cabinet departments on church-state relations. In this position he worked under Samuel Alito.

Hasson was involved in successfully arguing the right of the Catholic University of America to enact and enforce a Vatican ban on a professor from teaching theology. He also was a counsel for the Catholic Church in Abortion Rights Mobilization, Inc. v. United States Catholic Conference where he defended the right of the Catholic Church to maintain its tax exempt status while teaching and advocating its moral position on abortion.

He is a 1985 magna cum laude graduate of the University of Notre Dame Law School, and also holds a master's degree in theology from Notre Dame. He is a member of the board of directors of the Bible Literacy Project.

== Awards ==
In 2011, the International Center for Law and Religion Studies and J. Reuben Clark Law School of Brigham Young University presented Hasson the International Religious Liberty Award in recognition of his outstanding contributions to the promotion and preservation of religious freedom.

== Publications ==
- The Right to Be Wrong: Ending the Culture War Over Religion in America. San Francisco, CA: Encounter Books, 2005. ISBN 978-1594030833
- " 'Believers, Thinkers, and Founders: How We Came To Be One Nation Under God' ". New York, NY: Penguin Random House, 2016 ASIN B00540P9N4
