= Jim Tanner =

American sports and entertainment agent

Jim Tanner is the executive director and general manager of the University of North Carolina men's basketball team. He is a former sports and entertainment agent certified by the National Basketball Players Association (NBPA). Prior to his role at UNC, Tanner founded Tandem Sports + Entertainment in 2013 and served as its president. He represented clients including Tim Duncan, Ray Allen, Grant Hill, Vince Carter, Tamika Catchings and Jeremy Lin.

In 2006, Tanner was named to the Sports Business Journal and Washingtonian "40 Under 40" lists and he has twice been recognized by Sports Illustrated as one of the "101 Most Influential Minorities in Sports."

== Background ==
As an undergraduate student, Tanner attended his home state University of North Carolina-Chapel Hill on a Morehead-Cain Scholarship – the first merit scholarship program established in the United States and one of the most selective at public universities today. After graduating with a B.A. in English Literature (1990), Tanner continued his education at the University of Chicago Law School (1993), where he studied under then-professor, Barack Obama.

Tanner began his legal career as a corporate and mergers-and-acquisitions lawyer with the Washington, D.C., office of Skadden, Arps, Slate, Meagher & Flom LLP. After four years, Tanner left the firm to work on the 1996 Bill Clinton election campaign.

After the election, Tanner was recruited by Williams & Connolly LLP to work alongside then-partner, Lon Babby. Between 1997 and 2010, Tanner and Babby led the Williams & Connolly sports law practice, representing athletes in the National Basketball Association (NBA) and Women's National Basketball Association (WNBA). Between 2010, when Babby left the firm to become president of basketball operations for the Phoenix Suns, and 2013, Tanner was solely in charge of the basketball and entertainment practice, notably signing Jeremy Lin in the aftermath of "Linsanity.”

In 2013, Tanner left Williams & Connolly with his client base to establish Tandem Sports + Entertainment.

In February 2025, Tanner was named executive director and general manager of North Carolina Tar Heels men's basketball where he would help manage the construction of the roster, negotiate contracts, identify and hire new scouting and analytics staff, and spearhead player development programs.

== Personal life ==
A native of High Point, N.C., Tanner was a Morehead-Cain Scholar at UNC. He previously served on Carolina’s Board of Directors in the College of Arts and Sciences as well as the Board for the Morehead-Cain Scholarship Fund.
