= Old Lehigh County Courthouse =

United States historic place in Allentown, Pennsylvania

- U.S. National Register of Historic Places
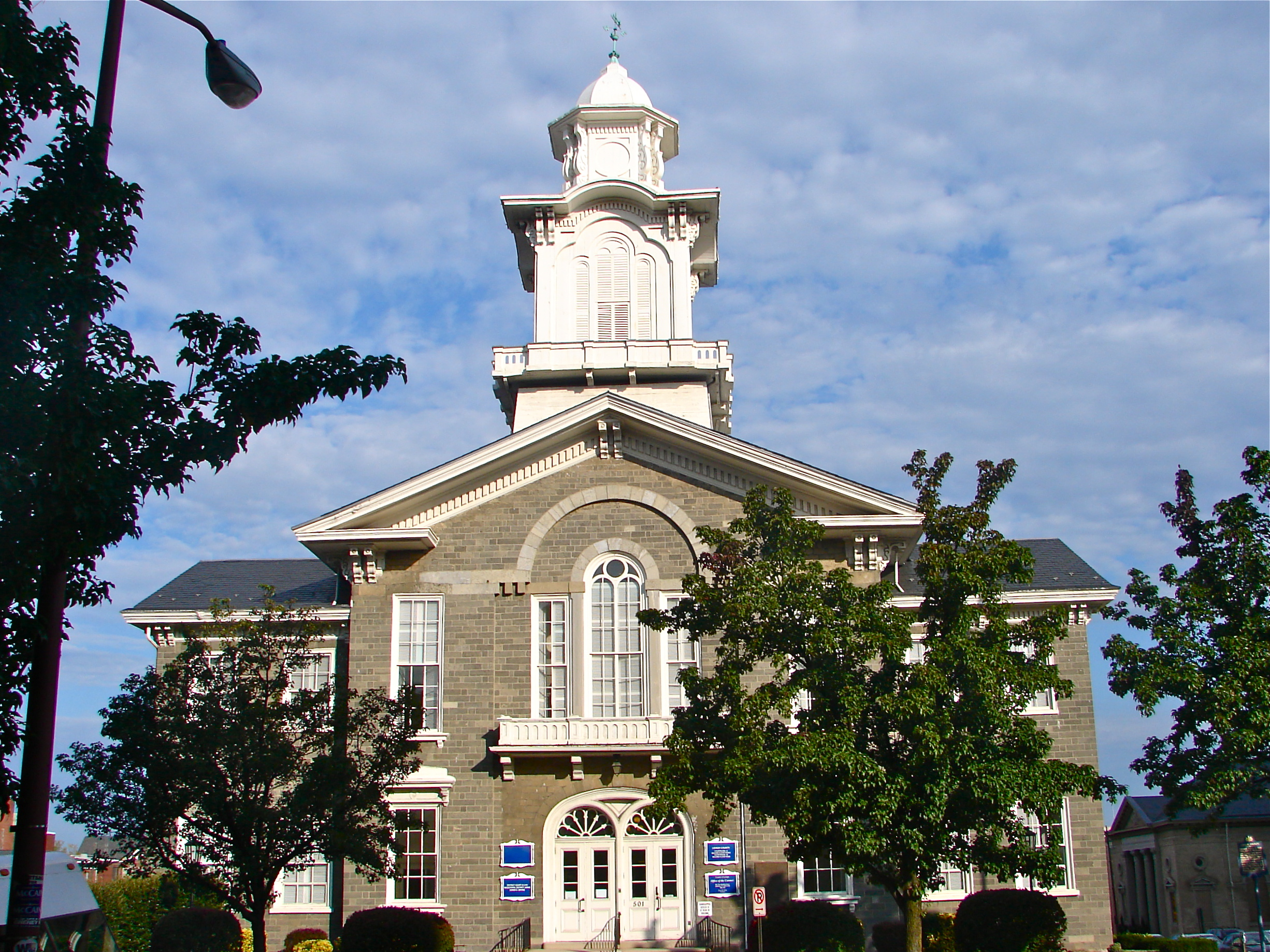
- Old Lehigh County Courthouse on Hamilton Street in Allentown in October 2011

- Location within Pennsylvania Location within the United States
- Location: 503 West Hamilton Street, Allentown, Pennsylvania, U.S.
- Coordinates: 40°36′13″N 75°28′4″W
- Area: 0.6 acres (0.24 ha)
- Built: 1819
- Architect: Culver, Eber; Ashbach, Gustav A.
- Architectural style: Beaux-Arts, Italianate, Federal
- NRHP reference No.: 81000550
- Added to NRHP: September 11, 1981

The Old Lehigh County Courthouse is a historic county courthouse located at 503 West Hamilton Street in Allentown, Pennsylvania. It was added to the National Register of Historic Places in 1981.

== History and architectural features ==
=== 19th century ===
The courthouse's original section was built between 1814 and 1819 and was a two-and-one-half-story stone building with a hipped roof. It was remodeled and enlarged in 1864, in the Italianate style. An addition on the west was added in between 1880 and 1881.

=== 20th century ===
Between 1914 and 1916, a second addition was added to its north between 1914 and 1916 in the Beaux-Arts style. The courthouse is featured on the Lehigh County seal, which was introduced in 1944. In 1981, in recognition of its historical significance, the Old Lehigh County Courthouse was added to the National Register of Historic Places.

== See also ==
- List of historic places in Allentown, Pennsylvania
- List of state and county courthouses in Pennsylvania
