= Williams & Connolly =

American law firm

Williams & Connolly LLP
- Headquarters: 680 Maine Avenue, S.W. Washington, D.C. United States
- No. of offices: 1
- No. of attorneys: 300–400
- Major practice areas: Litigation
- Date founded: 1967
- Founder: Edward Bennett Williams; Paul Connolly
- Company type: LLP
- Website: wc.com

Williams & Connolly LLP (W&C) is an American white-shoe law firm based in Washington, D.C., known for its specialization in white-collar crime defense. The firm was founded by trial lawyer Edward Bennett Williams and Paul Connolly in 1967.

High-profile cases include the successful defense of U.S. President Clinton's impeachment, representation of Enron's law firm Vinson & Elkins, representation of the motion picture studios in the Kazaa/Grokster file-trading litigation, defense of the Vioxx cases, and counsel for the plaintiff states in the United States v. Microsoft antitrust remedy trial. The firm represented Lieutenant Colonel Oliver North during the Iran-Contra Affair and John Hinckley, the would-be assassin of Ronald Reagan. In 2025, the firm was reported to have been hacked in a Chinese state-sponsored espionage campaign.

== Clientele ==
Williams & Connolly partner Robert Barnett has represented Barack Obama, Bill Clinton, George W. Bush, James Patterson, Hillary Rodham Clinton, Michelle Obama, Laura Bush, Bob Woodward, Sarah Palin, Dick Cheney, Alan Greenspan, Katharine Graham, Ben Bernanke, Paul Ryan, Tim Russert, Barbra Streisand, Jack Welch, Khaled Hosseini, Bill Walton, Mitch McConnell, Jake Tapper, and others.

The firm's corporate clients include Google, Disney, Samsung, Intel, Bank of America, The Carlyle Group, Medtronic, Genentech, Eli Lilly, Halkbank, and 21st Century Fox. The firm represented Elizabeth Holmes in her Theranos criminal trial.

In 2023, the University of Michigan retained Williams & Connolly to consult the University in connection with the alleged opponents’ play signal decoding scandal involving the Michigan football program. In 2024, the University of Virginia retained W&C to investigate allegations against Melina Kibbe following an open letter signed by 128 faculty members declaring no confidence in her.

In 2025, Perkins Coie hired Williams & Connolly to defend itself after being targeted in an executive order by President Donald Trump. W&C filed suit against the order in federal court winning a restraining order. W&C was described as "a very brave law firm" by the U.S. district judge in the case, given that the Trump administration was determined to punish and terrorize law firms that provided services to Trump's perceived opponents.

In January 2026, Federal Reserve Bank chairman Jerome Powell retained Williams & Connolly in response to President Donald Trump's retaliatory prosecution against Powell.

== Recognition ==
Williams & Connolly has a notable reputation for being aggressive and skilled firm in cases against the Department of Justice, and is known for its scorched-earth approach.

In 2025, Vault.com ranked Williams & Connolly as the #1 firm for White Collar Defense and Internal Investigation in the United States and the #2 law firm in Washington, DC. Williams & Connolly is the subject of the 2010 book Masters of the Game: Inside the World's Most Powerful Law Firm by Kim Eisler.

As of 2024, no woman had made as many United States Supreme Court appearances as Williams & Connolly partner Lisa Blatt, who has advocated in front of the Supreme Court over 50 times.

The American Lawyer jointly named Williams & Connolly Law Firm of the Year in 2025, among eight firms, four of which were honored for successful challenges to executive orders, and four others, including Williams & Connolly, for legal representations of those firms.

== Alumni ==
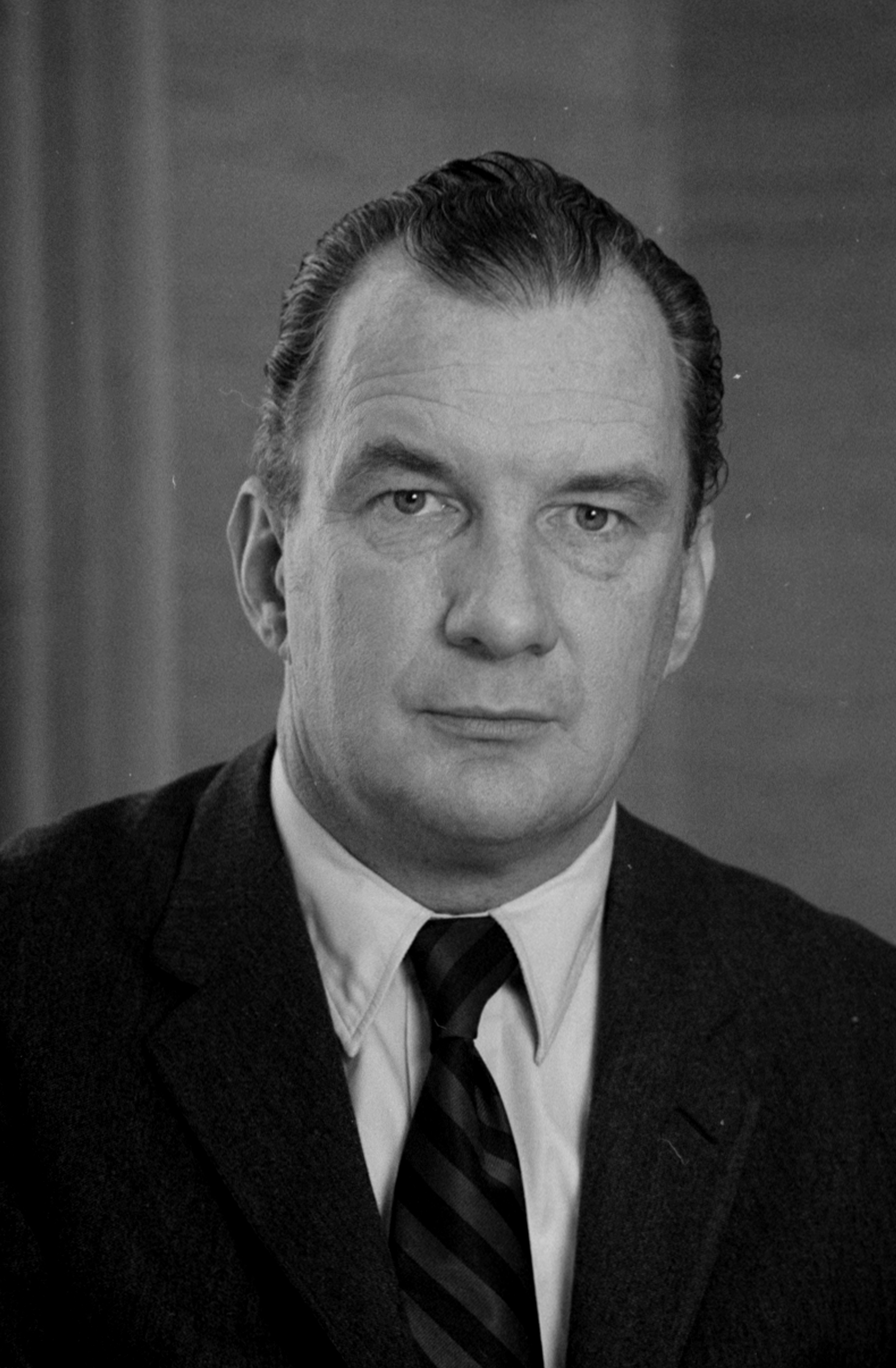
- The firm was founded by trial lawyer Edward Bennett Williams, a graduate of the College of the Holy Cross and Georgetown University who became famous for his high-profile clients
  Edward Bennett Williams, high-profile founder of the firm, Washington Redskins and Baltimore Orioles team owner, and political power broker

=== Supreme Court Justices ===
- Elena Kagan, associate justice of the United States Supreme Court
- Brett Kavanaugh, associate justice of the United States Supreme Court, worked for one summer as a summer associate

Over the past decade, 45 Supreme Court clerks have been full-time or summer associates with Williams & Connolly.

=== Judiciary ===
- Whitney Hermandorfer, judge of the United States Court of Appeals for the Sixth Circuit
- Sven Erik Holmes, former judge of the United States District Court for the Northern District of Oklahoma and former chief legal officer of KPMG
- Ellen Segal Huvelle, former senior judge of the United States District Court for the District of Columbia and first woman partner at Williams & Connolly
- Embry Kidd, judge of the United States Court of Appeals for the Eleventh Circuit
- Scott Matheson Jr., judge of the United States Court of Appeals for the Tenth Circuit
- Allison Jones Rushing, judge of the United States Court of Appeals for the Fourth Circuit
- Ana C. Reyes, judge of the United States District Court for the District of Columbia
- Amul Thapar, judge of the United States Court of Appeals for the Sixth Circuit
- Nancy Torresen, senior judge of the United States District Court for the District of Maine and first female judge to serve in the District of Maine

=== Government ===
- Joseph A. Califano, Jr., former named partner of Williams, Connolly & Califano, former U.S. Secretary of Health, Education, and Welfare under President Jimmy Carter, and former White House Domestic Affairs Advisor under President Lyndon B. Johnson
- Gregory Craig, former White House counsel under President Barack Obama
- Jenny Durkan, former mayor of Seattle and former U.S. Attorney for the Western District of Washington
- Laurie S. Fulton, former United States Ambassador to Germany under President Barack Obama
- Howard Gutman, former United States Ambassador to Belgium under President Barack Obama
- Sarah M. Harris, Principal Deputy Solicitor General and former Acting Solicitor General under President Donald Trump
- Cynthia Hogan, former Deputy Assistant to the President and Counsel to Vice President Joe Biden
- Mary Beth Long, the first woman confirmed by the U.S. Senate as an Assistant Secretary of Defense, the first female civilian four-star military equivalent in the history of The Pentagon, and the first woman to be appointed as chair of NATO's High Level Group
- Daniel Meltzer, former chair of the Intelligence Oversight Board and Principal Deputy Counsel under President Barack Obama
- Judith A. Miller, former general counsel of the United States Department of Defense under President Bill Clinton and former general counsel of the Bechtel Corporation
- Mike Pompeo, 70th United States Secretary of State
- Matt Rice, Solicitor General of Tennessee and former professional basketball player
- Chuck Robb, former U.S. Senator from Virginia and Governor of Virginia
- Karyn Temple, former U.S. Register of Copyrights

=== Business ===
- Lon Babby, former President of Basketball Operations of the Phoenix Suns
- Greg Baer, president and CEO of the Bank Policy Institute
- Kevin Hasson, founder and president emeritus of the Becket Fund for Religious Liberty
- Jeff Kindler, former CEO of Pfizer
- Jason Levien, CEO and co-chairman of D.C. United and Chairman of Brisbane Bullets, formerly CEO and Managing Partner of the Memphis Grizzlies
- Larry Lucchino, president and CEO emeritus of the Boston Red Sox
- C.J. Mahoney, Chief Legal Officer of Meta Platforms
- Nicole Seligman, former president of Sony Entertainment
- Max Stier, president and CEO of the Partnership for Public Service
- Jim Tanner, executive director and general manager of the University of North Carolina men's basketball team
- Katharine Weymouth, former publisher of The Washington Post

=== Academia ===
- Paul Butler, criminal law scholar and professor at Georgetown University Law Center and former federal prosecutor
- Mary-Rose Papandrea, constitutional law scholar and professor at George Washington University School of Law
- Theodore Ruger, constitutional law scholar, professor and former dean of University of Pennsylvania Law School
- Michael Tigar, professor emeritus of law at Duke University School of Law, former professor at University of California, Los Angeles School of Law, University of Texas at Austin School of Law, and American University Washington College of Law, after a career as a solo practitioner in criminal defense and human rights
