= David E. Kendall =

American lawyer

David Kendall
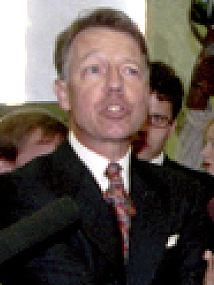
- Kendall in 1998
- Born: David Evan Kendall; May 2, 1944 (age 82); Camp Atterbury, Indiana, U.S.
- Education: Wabash College (BA); Yale University (JD); Worcester College, Oxford (BA)
- Occupation: Attorney
- Spouse: Anne (m. 1968)
- Children: 3

David Evan Kendall (born May 2, 1944) is an American attorney, a graduate of Wabash College, Yale Law School, and Worcester College, Oxford, who clerked with Supreme Court Justice Byron White, worked as associate counsel at the NAACP Legal Defense Fund, and has been a partner at Williams & Connolly LLP of Washington, DC since 1981, where he has provided legal counsel to individuals and corporations on high-profile business and political matters.

He is known for his roles in the Coker v. Georgia, Gilmore v. Utah, and other death penalty cases; in the copyright and contract cases of MGM Studios v. Grokster and Tasini v. AOL; as well as in various First Amendment cases, including for The Washington Post. In addition, he is known for having advised President Bill Clinton during the Lewinsky scandal, and representing him during his impeachment trial. He served as defense attorney in the successful defense of retired General David Petraeus, and currently represents the former Secretary of State, Hillary Clinton, including in the matter of her use of a private email server while serving as U.S. Secretary of State.

== Early life and education ==
Kendall was born at Camp Atterbury near Edinburgh, Indiana, on May 2, 1944, and grew up in Sheridan, Indiana. While a student at Wabash College, Kendall helped register black voters in Mississippi during the Freedom Summer of 1964, which led to his arrest on multiple occasions. While in Mississippi, he was the roommate of murdered civil rights worker Andrew Goodman during the last week of Goodman's life.

Kendall obtained his Bachelor of Arts in history from Wabash College in 1966 (summa cum laude, Phi Beta Kappa). As a Rhodes Scholar, Kendall earned a degree at Worcester College, Oxford in 1968, elevated to a Master of Arts (Oxon) per tradition. He earned a Juris Doctor from Yale Law School in 1971, where he met Bill Clinton and Hillary Clinton.

== Career ==
=== Clerkship and NAACP ===
Following a clerkship with Supreme Court Justice Byron White, Kendall served at the NAACP Legal Defense Fund from 1973 to 1978, focusing on criminal defense practice, and handling high-profile death penalty cases including Coker v. Georgia and the death penalty appeals of John Spenkelink.

=== Professional practice ===
He joined Williams & Connolly LLP, a Washington, D.C. law firm, in 1978 and became a partner there in 1981. He currently works on diverse matters such as intellectual property, criminal investigations, and the William J. Clinton Presidential Center and Clinton Foundation. As he states in his profile at his law firm's web page, he "has appeared in trial courts in 23 states and has argued appeals in six federal courts of appeal, seven state supreme courts, and the Supreme Court of the United States." He has briefed and argued numerous important criminal cases before the Supreme Court on pro bono assignments.

==== Representation of corporate clients ====
His notable clients have included the Washington Post and the National Enquirer (in First Amendment cases), Baltimore Orioles owner Peter Angelos (in a naming rights case), the Motion Picture Association of America (in their copyright and intellectual property case against Napster and Grokster), as well as AOL and other clients. He successfully defended AOL in a class-action suit, Tasini v. AOL, wherein contributors to The Huffington Post, who were not paid for their work, claimed that they were entitled to compensation when AOL purchased The Huffington Post.

==== Representation of President Clinton ====
Kendall began representing President Clinton in November 1993 in an investigation related to the Arkansas savings and loan, Whitewater Development Company, Inc. As the investigation expanded, Kendall went on to represent Clinton during the 1998–99 impeachment proceedings, and continues to represent the Clintons in miscellaneous civil matters.

Kendall advised President Clinton during the grand jury appearance that led to the discovery of Clinton's relationship with White House intern Monica Lewinsky. The Washington Post notes that the Washington legal establishment was critical of Kendall's advising Clinton to pursue the "legalistic argument" that Clinton's sexual encounters with the intern did not constitute a sexual relationship, "for not having Clinton come forward earlier with the truth about Lewinsky, for letting him testify before the grand jury [and digging] himself into even deeper… trouble with his… answers, and for inflaming [Independent Counsel Kenneth] Starr with repeated attacks;" he is credited, however, for the fruit born from battles with Starr, including the August 1998 ruling of Judge Norma Holloway Johnson "accusing Starr of violating grand jury secrecy rules," and for improving the public's perception of his client's case by referring to the Starr Report as "an extravagant effort to find a case where there is none."

==== Representation of General David Petraeus ====
Kendall served as counsel to retired General David Petraeus, over his mishandling and dissemination of classified materials (to his biographer, Paula Broadwell), where Kendall saw felony charges reduced and possible prison time avoided in Petraeus's misdemeanor guilty plea and sentence of two years of probation and a $100,000 fine.

==== Representation of Secretary Clinton ====
Kendall began representing former Secretary of State, Hillary Clinton, before her State Department appointment, in November 1993, over matters regarding an Arkansas savings and loan, Whitewater Development Company, Inc., and represented her interests throughout her husband's legal challenges during his presidency, including in bar counsel investigations and civil litigation.

Kendall currently represents the former Secretary in the matter of her use of a private e-mail server while serving as United States Secretary of State, as well as in various civil matters.

== Published works ==
- ABA Standards for Criminal Justice: Fair Trial and Free Press (1991), as a part of the ABA Task Force

== Honors ==
Kendall was recognized with a Doctor of Laws, honoris causa (honorary), degree from his alma mater, Wabash College, on May 16, 2010.

== Personal life ==
Kendall has been married to Anne L. Kendall, a psychologist with the Wake Kendall Group, since 1968, and they have three children.

== See also ==
- List of law clerks for the sixth seat of the Supreme Court of the United States
