= Cheryl Mills =

American lawyer

29th Counselor of the United States Department of State
- In office May 24, 2009 – February 3, 2013
- President: Barack Obama
- Preceded by: Eliot Cohen
- Succeeded by: Heather Higginbottom

Chief of Staff to the United States Secretary of State
- In office January 21, 2009 – February 1, 2013
- President: Barack Obama
- Preceded by: Brian Gunderson
- Succeeded by: David Wade

White House Counsel
- Acting
- In office August 6, 1999 – September 1999
- President: Bill Clinton
- Preceded by: Chuck Ruff
- Succeeded by: Beth Nolan

Personal details
- Born: Cheryl Denise Mills; 1965 (age 60–61)
- Party: Democratic
- Spouse: David Domenici
- Education: University of Virginia (BA); Stanford University (JD)

Cheryl Denise Mills (born 1965) is an American lawyer and corporate executive. She first came into public prominence while serving as deputy White House Counsel for President Bill Clinton, whom she defended during his 1999 impeachment trial. She has worked for New York University as Senior Vice President, served as Senior Adviser and Counsel for Hillary Clinton's 2008 presidential campaign, and is considered a member of Hillary Clinton's group of core advisers, self-designated as "Hillaryland". She served as counselor and chief of staff to Hillary Clinton during her whole tenure as United States Secretary of State. After leaving the State Department in January, 2013, she founded BlackIvy Group, which builds businesses in Africa.

On September 3, 2015, she testified before the House Select Committee on Benghazi regarding her and former Secretary Clinton's actions and role during the 2012 Benghazi attack, although the fact that she no longer held a security clearance may have limited the scope of the committee's questioning.

== Early life and education ==
Mills is the daughter of a lieutenant colonel in the U.S. Army and grew up on Army posts all over the world, including Belgium, West Germany, and the U.S. She attended Eleanor Roosevelt High School in Greenbelt, Maryland. Mills received her B.A. from the University of Virginia in 1987, where she was Phi Beta Kappa, and her J.D. from Stanford Law School in 1990, where she was elected to Stanford Law Review. She married David Domenici.

She worked as an associate at the Washington law firm of Hogan & Hartson. While there, she represented school districts seeking to achieve racial integration per Brown v. Board of Education.

== White House counsel ==
After serving as Deputy General Counsel of the Clinton/Gore Transition Planning Foundation after Clinton's 1992 election, she served as Associate Counsel to the President in the White House from 1993 on. Until the impeachment, she was little known to the public, although she did rise to public attention when a burglar reportedly broke into her car and stole documents relating to the handling of the late Vincent Foster's papers related to the Whitewater controversy, as well as the 1993 federal raid on the Branch Davidian compound in Waco.

During the impeachment trial, the BBC reported that she was "widely regarded as the shining star of the defense team, and gave an effective presentation on President Clinton's behalf on the second day of defense arguments." Other media outlets also viewed her work quite favorably. Her presentation to the Senate focused on refuting the obstruction of justice charge and the House Managers' claim that failure to convict the President would damage the rule of law. Her summation became known for its endorsement of Clinton's record with respect towards women and minorities; she said, "I stand here before you today because President Bill Clinton believed I could stand here for him . . . I'm not worried about civil rights, because this President's record on civil rights, on women's rights, on all of our rights is unimpeachable."

After Clinton was acquitted, Mills was offered the White House Counsel position when Charles Ruff stepped down, but she declined.

== Post-White House career ==
After leaving the Clinton administration, Mills took a break from the practice of law. From 1999 to 2001, she served as Senior Vice President for Corporate Policy and Public Programming at Oxygen Media.

By 2002, she was working for New York University (NYU). While at NYU, she played a central role in the university administration's efforts around union contracts with adjunct faculty and graduate students. The Washington Post reported in October 2015 that, during Mills' first four months at the State Department, she continued to work at NYU on a part-time basis, negotiating with officials in Abu Dhabi to build a campus in the United Arab Emirates city. She worked for no pay in those first months at the State Department, and was officially designated as a "temporary expert-consultant", which allowed her to continue receiving outside income while serving as Clinton's Chief of Staff. On her financial disclosure forms, she reported $198,000 in income from NYU in 2009, during the period her university work overlapped with her time at the State Department, and that she collected an additional $330,000 in vacation and severance payments when she left the university's payroll in May 2009. Additionally, Mills remained on the Clinton Foundation’s unpaid board for a short time after joining the State Department. Another Clinton aide, Huma Abedin, spent her final six months employed as Clinton’s deputy chief of staff in 2012, while also simultaneously employed by the Clinton Foundation. As has Abedin's, Mills’ employment arrangement has raised questions regarding potential conflicts of interest, in Mills' case about how one of the State Department's top employees set boundaries between her public role and a private job that involved work on a project funded by a foreign government. Under Federal ethics laws, employees are prohibited from participating in matters that would have any direct and predictable effect on themselves or an outside employer. Mills told The Washington Post that she did not “recall any issues” at the State Department that would have required her recusing herself, and said she would have consulted with the ethics office if such an issue had come up. Nick Merrill, a spokesman for the Clinton campaign, declined to comment.

== Department of State ==
Mills served as the counselor and chief of staff to Secretary of State Hillary Clinton beginning in January 2009. In her capacity as counselor, she was a principal officer who served the Secretary as a special adviser on major foreign policy challenges. As chief of staff, Mills managed the department's staff, providing support to the Secretary in administering operations of the department. Several months after her appointment, former White House Press Secretary Joe Lockhart noted in an interview: “I think Secretary Clinton wants to know you’re a team player, but she wants to hear it straight and she gets exactly that from Cheryl.”

In summer 2016, CNN reported on another ethical question pertaining to Mills' relationship with the Clinton Foundation during her tenure at the State Department: In 2012 Mills had traveled to New York City in order to assist the foundation by conducting interviews in a high-level candidate search. Mills' attorney emphasized that she had assisted on a strictly volunteer basis, and was not paid for her services or travel; a State Department spokesperson indicated that such an undertaking was not in conflict with federal ethics rules.

=== Attorney-client privilege ===
As an employee of the United States Department of State, Mills was Counselor to the Secretary of State; it is unclear under the Federal Rules of Evidence whether attorney–client privilege applies to these communications in the private and public sectors. Law Professor Patricia Salkin writes in The Urban Lawyer that "government lawyers would be well advised to caution their government clients, particularly if the client is believed to be an individual public official, about the uncertainty of the privilege for what may be about to be disclosed". Mills' attorney raised this protection in May 2016, as Mills was being questioned by the Federal Bureau of Investigation in connection with the investigation of Clinton's private email server. In 2002, the United States Court of Appeals for the Seventh Circuit reiterated that government lawyers may not exercise an attorney-client privilege in an effort to shield information from a grand jury.

On June 18, 2018, U.S. Senators posed questions regarding Miss Mills and her colleague Heather Samuelson within the unprecedented relationships between her government duties and her private practice in light of possible scenario of obstruction of justice to Michael Horowitz and Christopher Wray. Horowitz indicated that the decision to delete emails would have been limited to "non-work related" emails. FBI boss Wray said that he could not come up with a scenario concerning a precedent of such relations between "witnesses" or "suspects" in response to Senator Whitehouse.

=== Food security ===
Mills oversaw the department's interagency global hunger and food security initiative (Feed the Future) and diplomacy and development efforts in Haiti working closely with USAID and others across the government. She served as the United States representative on the Interim Haiti Recovery Commission (IHRC).

Shortly after taking office, Secretary Clinton asked Mills to lead an interagency consultation of current agriculture and food security efforts. The subsequent strategy became (Feed the Future). The Obama administration pledged $3.5 billion over three years to boost agricultural productivity. Describing the importance of food security Mills said, "We are always worried whenever people can't feed themselves. And particularly worried when that actually might translate to destabilization of a country. It is one of the reasons why this program is such an important one."

=== Haiti ===
In January 2011, Mills joined Prime Minister Jean-Max Bellerive, the Inter-American Development Bank, Sae-A and the Interim Haiti Recovery Commission, headed by Bill Clinton, to announce the construction of Caracol Industrial Park in Northern Haiti. Its first tenant was projected to create 20,000 jobs alone. She has said, "I feel a special connection to Haiti and the Haitian people. The power of Haitian heritage and the strength of the Haitian people is tremendous. And, Haiti holds a unique and rich role in the history of African Americans."

In her keynote speech at the ribbon-cutting ceremony at Caracol Industrial Park on October 22, 2012, then-Secretary of State Hillary Clinton praised Mills as "a real driver of our government’s support for everything that we see here today".

== BlackIvy Group ==
Mills founded BlackIvy Group and is CEO of BlackIvy Group, a company which builds and grows enterprises in Africa. Her close professional relationship with Sae-A chairman Woong-ki Kim led them to cooperate with Costa Rican president Luis Guillermo Solís cutting the ribbon at the new Sae-A factory in Costa Rica.

== Other ==
Throughout her career, Mills has been active in community service and civic affairs. In 1990, she worked with DCWorks, a non-profit organization that supported the academic and social development of underprivileged high school students of color. She served on the Boards of the See Forever Foundation, National Partnership for Women and Families, the Leadership Conference on Civil Rights Education Fund, the Jackie Robinson Foundation, the Center for American Progress, and the William J. Clinton Presidential Library Foundation. In 2010, Mills received UVA's Distinguished Alumna Award. In the corporate world, Mills served on the board of Cendant Corporation.

Mills has spoken about women in the work place and work-life balance. “There weren't often a lot of models where you could see women at the height of what they were doing and balancing their family,” she told ABC News. “And being able to see her [Clinton] with Chelsea, see what their relationship was like, see when she took the time, all those things helped you to be thoughtful about how to be an effective parent yourself."

On March 26, 2014, Elle magazine honored Mills at the Italian Embassy in the United States during its annual “Women in Washington Power List” celebration.

Legal offices
Preceded by Chuck Ruff	White House Counsel; Acting; 1999	Succeeded by Beth Nolan
Government offices
Preceded by Brian Gunderson	Chief of Staff to the United States Secretary of State; 2009–2013	Succeeded by David Wade
Preceded by Eliot Cohen	Counselor of the United States Department of State; 2009–2013	Succeeded by Heather Higginbottom
