= Patricia Salkin =

American lawyer

Patricia E. Salkin
- Born: Suffern, New York, U.S.
- Other name: Patty
- Education: University at Albany; Albany Law School and University of the Arts
- Occupations: Lawyer, Provost, Educator, Writer
- Known for: Provost at Touro University

Patricia E. Salkin is an American jurist. She is the Senior Vice President for Academic for the Touro University System, and the Provost of the Graduate and Professional Divisions of Touro University. She is the former (first woman) Dean of Touro College Jacob D. Fuchsberg Law Center in Central Islip, NY.

== Education and early career ==
Salkin graduated from Albany Law School in 1988.

After many years working at Albany Law School's Government Law Center, Salkin was appointed the Raymond & Ella Smith Distinguished Professor of Law, as well as Associate Dean and Director of the Government Law Center of Albany Law School.

Salkin co-chaired of the New York State Bar Association's Standing Committee on Legal Education and Admission to the Bar. She served as a member of the New York City Bar's Task Force on New Lawyers in a Changing Profession, beginning with its initial formation in July 2012. She is a past chair of the Association of American Law Schools' State & Local Government Law Section, and is the author of hundreds of books, articles and columns including a piece in the Journal of Legal Education on incorporating best practices into the teaching of land use law.

She served an appointed member of the National Environmental Justice Advisory Council, a Federal Advisory Committee to the U.S. Environmental Protection Agency.

She also has received her PhD in Creativity for her work titled "May It Please the Campus: Lawyers Leading Higher Education" from Rowan University.

== Bar association work ==
A member of the American Bar Association's House of Delegates, Salkin has held many leadership positions within both the ABA and the New York State Bar Association including: Past Chair of the ABA State and Local Government Section, Fellow of the ABA, and former member of the Standing Committee on Governmental Affairs (ABA); Past Chair of the NYSBA Municipal Law Section and Founding Member and Past Chair of the NYSBA Committee on Attorneys in Public Service; and she has chaired numerous NYSBA task forces including one focusing on: government ethics, eminent domain, and town and village justice courts.

== Scholarship ==
A nationally recognized scholar on land use law and zoning, Salkin is the author of the popular blog, Law of the Land. Her land use publications include: The 4-volume 4th edition of New York Zoning Law & Practice (1999–present); the 5-volume 5th edition of American Law of Zoning (2008–present); Bordering on Madness: An American Land Use Tale Companion (with Popper and Avitale)(2008); Land Use & Sustainable Development: Cases and Materials, 8th ed. (Thomson West) (with Nolon) (2012); Climate Change and Sustainable Development Law in a Nutshell (Thomson Reuters) (with Nolon) (2010); Land Use in a Nutshell (Thomson West) (with Nolon & Wright) (2007); The Greening of Local Governments (with Hirokawa, eds.) (ABA Press 2012); and the annual Zoning and Planning Law Handbook, ed. (Thomson Reuters).

She has served on the board of directors of the New York Planning Federation and has been active in land use reform efforts including membership on the Land Use Advisory Committee of the NYS Legislative Commission on Rural Resources. She is a reporter for the American Planning Association's Planning & Environmental Law and on the Editorial Advisory Board for The Urban Lawyer, produced by UMKC School of Law for the ABA. Salkin continues to serve as the long-term chair of the American Planning Association's Amicus Curiae Committee. She has consulted on land use issues for many national organizations including: the American Planning Association, the American Institute of Certified Planners, the National Academy for Public Administration and the National Governor's Association.

== Selected publications ==
=== Continuing treatises ===
- Salkin, Patricia E., American Law of Zoning, 5th ed. Thomson/West, 2008–present. WorldCat (OCLC) Catalog Record
- Salkin, Patricia E., New York Zoning Law and Practice, 4th ed. West Group, 1999–present. WorldCat (OCLC) Catalog Record
- Salkin, Patricia E., Zoning and Planning Law Handbook, 2014 ed. Clark Boardman Callaghan, 2010–present. World Cat (OCLC) Catalog Record

=== Books ===
- Salkin, Patricia E. Land Use Planning and Development Regulation Law, 3rd Edition, Practitioner Treatise Series (w/J. Juergensmeyer and T. Roberts). Thomson Reuters. ISBN 0314172505
- Salkin, Patricia E. Handling the Land Use Case: Land Use Law, Practice & Forms, 3rd Edition (w/ J. Delaney, S. Abrams, F. Schnidman and J. Tappendorf). Thomson Reuters, 2019.ISBN 978-1-539-23144-8
- Salkin, Patricia E., ed. Town and Gown: Legal Strategies for Effective Collaboration (w/C. Baker). Chicago, IL: American Bar Association Press, 2013. ISBN 978-1-61438-861-6
- Salkin, Patricia E. Navigating the New Public Square: Social Media and Local Governments (w/J. Tappendorf). Chicago, IL: American Bar Association Press, 2013. ISBN 978-1-61438-859-3
- Salkin, Patricia E. Climate Change and Sustainable Development Law in a Nutshell (w/J. Nolon). St. Paul, MN: Thomson West, 2011. ISBN 978-0-314-26420-6
- Salkin, Patricia E., ed. Pioneering Women in the Law: From Kate Stoneman to the Present. Chicago, IL: American Bar Association Press, 2008. ISBN 978-1-59031-984-0
- Salkin, Patricia E., ed. Ethical Standards in the Public Sector, 2nd ed. Chicago, IL: American Bar Association, Section of State and Local Government Law, 2008. ISBN 978-1-60442-062-3
- Salkin, Patricia E. Bordering on Madness: An American Land Use Tale, Companion Reader (w/ A. Popper and D. Avitabile). Durham, N.C.: Carolina Academic Press, 2008. ISBN 978-1-59460-579-6
- Salkin, Patricia E. Land Use and Community Development: Cases and Materials, 7th ed. (w/ J. Nolon and M. Gitelman. St. Paul, MN: Thomson West, 2008. ISBN 978-0-314-18498-6
- Salkin, Patricia E. Land Use in a Nutshell (w/ J. Nolon). St. Paul, MN: Thomson West, 2006. ISBN 978-0-314-16371-4
- Salkin, Patricia E., Land Use: Cases, Materials and Problems, 6th ed. (w/ M. Gitelman, J. Nolon and R. Wright). St. Paul, MN: Thomson West, 2004. ISBN 0-314-14602-4

=== Articles ===
Selected recent articles:

- "Honey, It's All the Buzz: Regulating Neighborhood Bee Hives" Boston College of Environmental Affairs Law Review, 2011
- "Feeding the Locavores One Chicken at Time: Regulating Backyard Chickens" Zoning and Planning Law Report, March 2011
- "Regulating Controversial Land Uses" Real Estate Law Journal, Vol. 39, p. 526, Spring 2011
- "Abandonment, Discontinuance and Amortization of Nonconforming Uses: Lessons for Drafters of Zoning Regulations" Real Estate Law Journal, Vol. 38, p. 482, Spring 2010,
- "Practically Grounded: Convergence of Land Use Law Pedagogy and Best Practices" Journal of Legal Education, Vol. 60, 2010
- "Can You Hear Me Up There? Giving Voice to Local Communities Imperative for Achieving Sustainability" Environmental & Energy Law & Policy Journal, Vol. 4, p. 256, 2009
- (with Amy Lavine) "Land Use Law and Active Living: Opportunities for States to Assume a Leadership Role in Promoting and Incentivizing Local Options" Rutgers Journal of Law and Urban Policy Vol. 5, 2008
- Squaring the Circle on Sprawl: What More Can We Do?: Progress Towards Sustainable Land Use in the States" Widener Law Journal, Vol. 16, No. 3, 2007
- (with Allyson Phillips) "Eliminating Political Maneuvering: A Light in the Tunnel for the Government Attorney-Client Privilege "Indiana Law Review, Vol. 39, 2006
- "Conflicts of Interest and Other Legal Ethical Considerations for Planners and Lawyers" Planning and Environmental Law, August 2005
- "Intersection Between Environmental Justice and Land Use Planning" Planning and Environmental Law, May 2006
- "Community Redevelopment, Public Use, and Eminent Domain" The Urban Lawyer, Vol. 37, No. 2, Spring 2005
- "Integrating Local Waterfront Revitalization into Local Comprehensive Planning and Zoning " Pace Environmental Law (PELR) Review, Vol. 22, 2005
- "GIS in an Age of Homeland Security: Accessing Public Information to Ensure a Sustainable Environment" William & Mary Environmental Law and Policy Review, Vol. 30, 2005

== Blogs ==
- Law of the Land

== Professional activities ==
- Co-chair, Committee on Legal Education and Admission to the Bar, New York State Bar Association, 2014–2019
- Co-chair, Government Ethics Task Force, New York State Bar Association, 2010-2011
- Member, American Law Institute, elected March 2010
- Fellow, American College of Real Estate Lawyers, elected March 2009
- Chair, Task Force on Eminent Domain, New York State Bar Association, 2005-2007
- Delegate, American Bar Association, 2005–present
- Elected Fellow, New York State Bar Association, 2005–present
- Elected Fellow, American Bar Association, 2003–present
- Member, Advisory Board, Land Use Law Institute, Vermont Law School, 2008–present
- Member, University Council, Empire State College, 2008–present
- Member, National Environmental Justice Advisory Council, U.S. EPA, 2007–present
- Editorial Board, The Urban Lawyer, University of Missouri-Kansas City School of Law,1996–98, 2002–Present
- Reporter, Planning and Environmental Law, 1992–present
- Chair, Amicus Curiae Committee, American Planning Association, 1999–Present

== Honors and awards ==
- Essence of SALT Award, Society of American Law Teachers (2022)
- Kate Stoneman Award, Albany Law School (2019)
- ICMA Honorary Member (2019)
- Brava Award, Smart CEO (2016)
- Ruth G. Shapiro Memorial Award, New York State Bar Association (2015)
- Women in the Courts Honoree, Suffolk County Courts (2014)
- Educational Leader, Long Island Women's Agenda (2013)
- Distinguished Educator for Excellence in Scholarship, Albany Law School (2008)
- Distinguished Alumna Award, Rockefeller College, University at Albany (2004)
- Excellence in Alumni Service, University at Albany Alumni Association (2004)
- Award for Excellence in Public Service, New York State Bar Association, Committee on Attorneys in Public Service (2002)
- Forty Under Forty, Capital District Business Review (2000)
- Outstanding Young Alumna Award, Albany Law School (1996)
