= Lanny A. Breuer =

American lawyer

Lanny Breuer
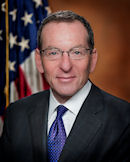

United States Assistant Attorney General for the Criminal Division
- In office April 20, 2009 – March 1, 2013
- President: Barack Obama
- Preceded by: Alice Fisher
- Succeeded by: Mythili Raman (acting)

Special Counsel to the President, Office of Counsel to the President
- In office February 1997 – April 1999
- President: Bill Clinton

Member of the United States Holocaust Memorial Council
- In office November 1999 – November 2004

Personal details
- Born: Lanny Arthur Breuer; August 5, 1958 (age 68) Queens, New York, U.S.
- Party: Democratic
- Spouse: Nancy Robinson Breuer
- Children: Samuel Breuer; Benjamin Breuer
- Education: Columbia University (BA, JD)

Lanny Arthur Breuer (born August 5, 1958) is an American criminal defense lawyer who currently serves as vice chair of Covington & Burling LLP. From 2009 to 2013, he served as Assistant Attorney General for the Criminal Division of the U.S. Department of Justice under President Barack Obama. From 1997 to 1999, he served as Special Counsel to President Bill Clinton. He is a fellow of the American College of Trial Lawyers.

== Early life and education ==
Breuer grew up in Elmhurst, Queens, where he attended Newtown High School. Breuer's parents were both Holocaust refugees; his father from Austria and his mother from Germany. His mother's parents were both murdered in the Holocaust. Breuer's father, a journalist in Vienna, came to America after fleeing to England. In the United States, Breuer's father was the music editor of Aufbau, a German language newspaper in New York. Breuer graduated from Columbia College in 1980, and Columbia Law School in 1985. He currently serves as Chair of the Columbia Alumni Association.

== Career ==
=== Early career ===
After graduating from Columbia Law School, Breuer was an assistant district attorney in Manhattan from 1985 to 1989. Asked how his mother reacted to his decision to become a junior D.A. after an expensive Columbia education, he recalled:

My parents just never made any money at all. I called up my mother to break the news that her son was not going to a law firm: "Mom, you've just got to remember that Cy Vance Jr. - who, of course, is now the D.A. — he's in the D.A.'s office. And Dan Rather Jr., he's in the D.A.'s office. And Andrew Cuomo, the son of the governor, he's in the D.A.'s office." There was a long pause. And my mother said: "Them? They should go to the D.A.'s office. You? You should go to a firm."

In fact, some 20 years later, his former boss, the legendary Manhattan D.A. Robert Morgenthau, would still remember Breuer as "a poor Jewish kid from Queens."

As an assistant district attorney, he prosecuted violent crime, such as armed robbery and gang violence, white collar crime, and other offenses.

From 1989 until 1997, Breuer practiced law with the law firm of Covington & Burling LLP in Washington, D.C. In this period, he represented U.S. Marine Sergeant Justin Elzie, one of the first U.S. service members to challenge his dismissal from the military for revealing that he was gay. He also received attention for defending Corey Moore in a first-degree murder trial.

=== White House Counsel's Office ===
In 1997, Breuer joined the White House Counsel's Office as special counsel to President Bill Clinton, working under counsel to the president Charles F.C. Ruff. As special counsel, Breuer defended the White House and President Clinton in the congressional and Justice Department investigations of the Clinton campaign's fundraising.

He also defended the White House and President Clinton in the various independent counsel investigations, including Ken Starr's Lewinsky investigation. During the impeachment proceedings against President Clinton, he defended the President in the impeachment hearings in the House and the impeachment trial in the Senate.

=== Private practice ===
Prior to becoming assistant attorney general, Breuer was a partner in the Washington law firm of Covington & Burling LLP and the co-chairman of its white-collar defense and investigations practice group. Breuer was best known for his work representing the subjects of congressional investigations. He represented the University of California in an investigation of Los Alamos National Laboratory, Moody's Investor Service in the wake of Enron's collapse, Halliburton/KBR in a hearing conducted by the House Committee on Oversight and Government Reform, Roger Clemens, Yahoo!, and the special litigation committee of the board of directors of Hewlett Packard.

Breuer made headlines when a former colleague from the White House, Sandy Berger, asked for representation after an investigation disclosed Berger's theft of classified documents from the National Archives.

== Assistant attorney general ==
On January 22, 2009, President Obama selected Breuer to head the Criminal Division of the Department of Justice. He was confirmed by the Senate on April 20, 2009, by a vote of 88–0. He immediately began recruiting elite lawyers from corporate firms, they later became known as the Breu Crew, in hopes of finding those responsible for culpable actions which eventually contributed to the 2008 financial crisis. The crackdown never took place.

=== FCPA enforcement and anti-corruption initiatives ===
During his tenure as assistant attorney general, Breuer substantially increased enforcement of the Foreign Corrupt Practices Act (FCPA), bringing in billions in penalties and leading prosecutions against numerous individuals.

His team has secured convictions against over three dozen individuals since 2009. Among the most noteworthy corporate resolutions in the FCPA area since Breuer became AAG are those involving BAE Systems ($400 million), JGC Corporation ($218.8 million), Daimler AG ($185 million), and Johnson & Johnson ($70 million).

On November 15, 2012, Breuer announced with the Securities and Exchange Commission the release of long-awaited guidance on the Department of Justice's and SEC's approach to FCPA enforcement. The 120-page guide, A Resource Guide to the U.S. Foreign Corrupt Practices Act — was largely praised by the business and enforcement communities.

=== Financial fraud and money laundering ===
In June 2012, under Breuer's leadership, the Fraud Section resolved an investigation of Barclays Bank into the bank's manipulation of the London Interbank Offered Rate, or LIBOR, the premier benchmark for short-term interest rates. Barclays entered into a non-prosecution agreement with the Justice Department, pursuant to which it agreed to pay $160 million. This was part of an approximately $450 million total resolution with U.S. and British authorities. Shortly after the announcement of the Barclays resolution, the top leadership of the bank was forced to resign.

On December 19, 2012, Attorney General Holder and Breuer announced the second LIBOR resolution, this time with UBS AG and UBS Japan. UBS Japan agreed to plead guilty to wire fraud, and UBS AG entered into a non-prosecution agreement with the government and, together with UBS Japan, agreed to pay $500 million in penalties. This was part of an approximately $1.5 billion total resolution with U.S., British, and Swiss authorities. In addition, two individual former UBS traders were charged by criminal complaint with manipulating LIBOR for their own ends.

On December 11, 2012, Breuer announced that HSBC agreed to forfeit $1.25 billion – the largest forfeiture by a bank in U.S. history – and to pay $665 million in civil penalties for violating the Bank Secrecy Act, the International Emergency Economic Powers Act, and the Trading With the Enemy Act. HSBC would not be criminally prosecuted for alleged terrorist financing. Commentator Glenn Greenwald noted the disparity between that decision and the extremely harsh penalties regularly doled out to powerless American Muslims accused of similar behavior. A New York Times editorial called the decision a "dark day for the rule of law."

The department has also reached resolutions with, among others, ING Bank ($619 million), Standard Chartered ($227 million), and MoneyGram ($100 million).

Under Breuer's tenure, the Criminal Division also secured the conviction and 30-year prison sentence of the former chairman of Taylor, Bean & Whitaker in a $3 billion bank fraud, and the conviction and 110-year prison sentence of R. Allen Stanford for perpetrating a $7 billion Ponzi scheme.

=== BP oil spill ===
On November 15, 2012, Breuer and Attorney General Holder jointly announced the largest criminal resolution in history in connection with the April 20, 2010 Deepwater Horizon oil rig explosion. As part of the resolution, BP agreed to plead guilty to 11 felony manslaughter charges, environmental crimes, and obstruction of Congress, and to pay $4 billion in criminal fines and penalties. In addition to resolving charges against the corporation, the two highest-ranking supervisors on board the Deepwater Horizon were charged with manslaughter, and a former BP executive was charged with obstruction of Congress and making false statements.

=== Organized and violent crime and cooperation with Mexico ===
Breuer coordinated the largest mafia takedown in the U.S. Department of Justice's history, announcing with Attorney General Holder in January 2011 charges against more than 125 members of La Cosa Nostra. The division has also prosecuted the most notorious national and international violent gangs operating in U.S. cities and along the southwest border, such as MS-13 in North Carolina, Maryland, and California, and the Aryan Brotherhood of Texas.

The division also brought the largest U.S. prosecution of an international criminal network organized to sexually exploit children. Along with these efforts, Breuer and his team led the extradition of more than 300 defendants from Mexico since 2009, including over 110 defendants in 2012. He has also overseen the investigations of the murders of U.S. citizens and others in Mexico, including ICE Agent Jaime Zapata.

=== Fast and Furious ===
In December 2011, Senator Chuck Grassley called for Breuer's resignation due to his involvement with Operation Fast and Furious. In October 2011, Breuer stated that he regretted having not done more to raise concerns at the U.S. Justice Department.

In September 2012, the Justice Department's Office of Inspector General released a comprehensive report examining Operation Fast and Furious and related matters. The report exonerated Breuer with respect to the operation, concluding that he did not authorize any of the investigative activities in Operation Fast and Furious, including the wiretap applications, and was unaware in 2009 or 2010 that ATF agents in Operation Fast and Furious were failing to interdict firearms. Grassley stated that the report was wrong, citing evidence that Breuer was fully aware of the operation and had lied to Congress during his testimony.

=== Additional items ===
Breuer was in this position during the prosecution of Thomas Andrews Drake, an NSA whistleblower indicted in 2010 under the Espionage Act of 1917 for "retaining national defense information", which led investigative reporter Jane Mayer to write, "Because reporters often retain unauthorized defense documents, Drake's conviction would establish a legal precedent making it possible to prosecute journalists as spies."

=== Criticism ===
Breuer was criticized by many for failing to pursue criminal cases against major financial institutions, like UBS and HSBC. Author Matt Taibbi, in his book, The Divide, argued that Breuer was "risk averse" and that he and Attorney General Eric Holder were overly concerned about the "collateral damage in the form of bad press and political fallout" should they lose a criminal prosecution and thus pushed for cash settlements over proper criminal procedure.

=== Departure from DOJ and return to private practice ===
On January 23, 2013, the Washington Post reported that Breuer was expected to step down and leave the office after being one of the longest-serving heads of the Criminal Division.

The Washington Post article followed the broadcast of a Frontline program on January 22, 2013 criticizing the paucity of prosecutions arising from Wall Street fraud, given the relative ease with which Frontline investigators located whistleblowers. Breuer explained his reasons in the broadcast, focusing on a perceived lack of evidence sufficient to overcome the evidentiary standard of beyond a reasonable doubt and the economic effect of bringing a case against a systemically important institution.

On January 30, 2013, AAG Breuer's departure was confirmed by the Justice Department, as taking place on March 1, 2013.

Upon leaving the DOJ, Breuer rejoined Covington & Burling as its vice chair. The New York Times speculated that he could earn as much as $4 million in private practice.

== Media representation ==
Breuer features extensively in PBS Frontline's 'Untouchables'.
