= Alice S. Fisher =

American lawyer

Alice Fisher
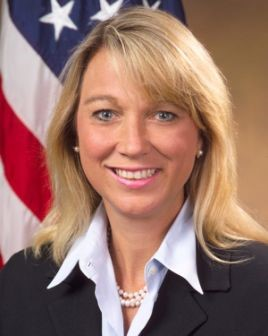

United States Assistant Attorney General for the Criminal Division
- In office August 31, 2005 – May 23, 2008
- President: George W. Bush
- Preceded by: Christopher Wray
- Succeeded by: Lanny Breuer

Personal details
- Born: Alice Stevens Biedenbender; January 27, 1967 (age 59) Louisville, Kentucky, U.S.
- Party: Republican
- Spouse(s): W. Clinton Fisher, III
- Education: Vanderbilt University (BA); Catholic University (JD)

Alice Stevens Fisher (born January 27, 1967) is an American lawyer and partner at the Washington, D.C. office of Latham & Watkins. Fisher served as Deputy United States Assistant Attorney General for the Criminal Division from 2001 to 2003 and as an Assistant Attorney General in the Department of Justice Criminal Division for three years, from 2005 to May 23, 2008.

In 2010 Fisher was recognized as one of "Washington's Most Influential Women Lawyers" by the National Law Journal and was rated among the top 45 women lawyers under 45 in 2011 by The American Lawyer in 2011.

On May 13, 2017, Fisher was interviewed for the post of FBI Director following the dismissal of James Comey by President Donald Trump. Fisher withdrew her name from consideration the week of May 15, 2017.

== Education ==
From 1985 to 1989, Fisher studied at Vanderbilt University in Nashville, Tennessee, where she completed her bachelor's degree. In 1989, she began her studies at the Columbus School of Law (CUA Law) of the Catholic University of America, in Washington, D.C. where she earned her J.D. in 1992.

== Early career ==
According to statements at her May 12, 2005 AAG nomination hearing, Fisher graduated from law school in 1992 and then worked for "several years as an associate at Sullivan and Cromwell". Her clients included "corporations in civil litigation". She also represented an inmate on death row in a "habeas corpus appeal".

From 2001 to 2003, during the tenure of Michael Chertoff—then-United States Assistant Attorney General for the Criminal Division—who became her "longtime" mentor, (Note: Leahy said Fisher was Chertoff's "long-time protégé".) Fisher was Deputy United States Assistant Attorney General for the Criminal Division. By 2005 she had become a partner in Latham & Watkins in Washington, D.C.

== Latham & Watkins ==
By 2005, Fisher was a partner at the law firm of Latham & Watkins in Washington, D.C. Fisher specializes in "white collar criminal investigations, internal investigations and advising clients on a range of criminal matters", including: international criminal matters relating to alleged bribery under the Foreign Corrupt Practices Act (FCPA) and similar foreign laws; economic sanction and export control issues; and criminal matters such as healthcare fraud, accounting and securities fraud and procurement fraud. Fisher previously served as global co-chair of the firm's white-collar and government investigations practice group.

== Assistant Attorney General for the Criminal Division ==
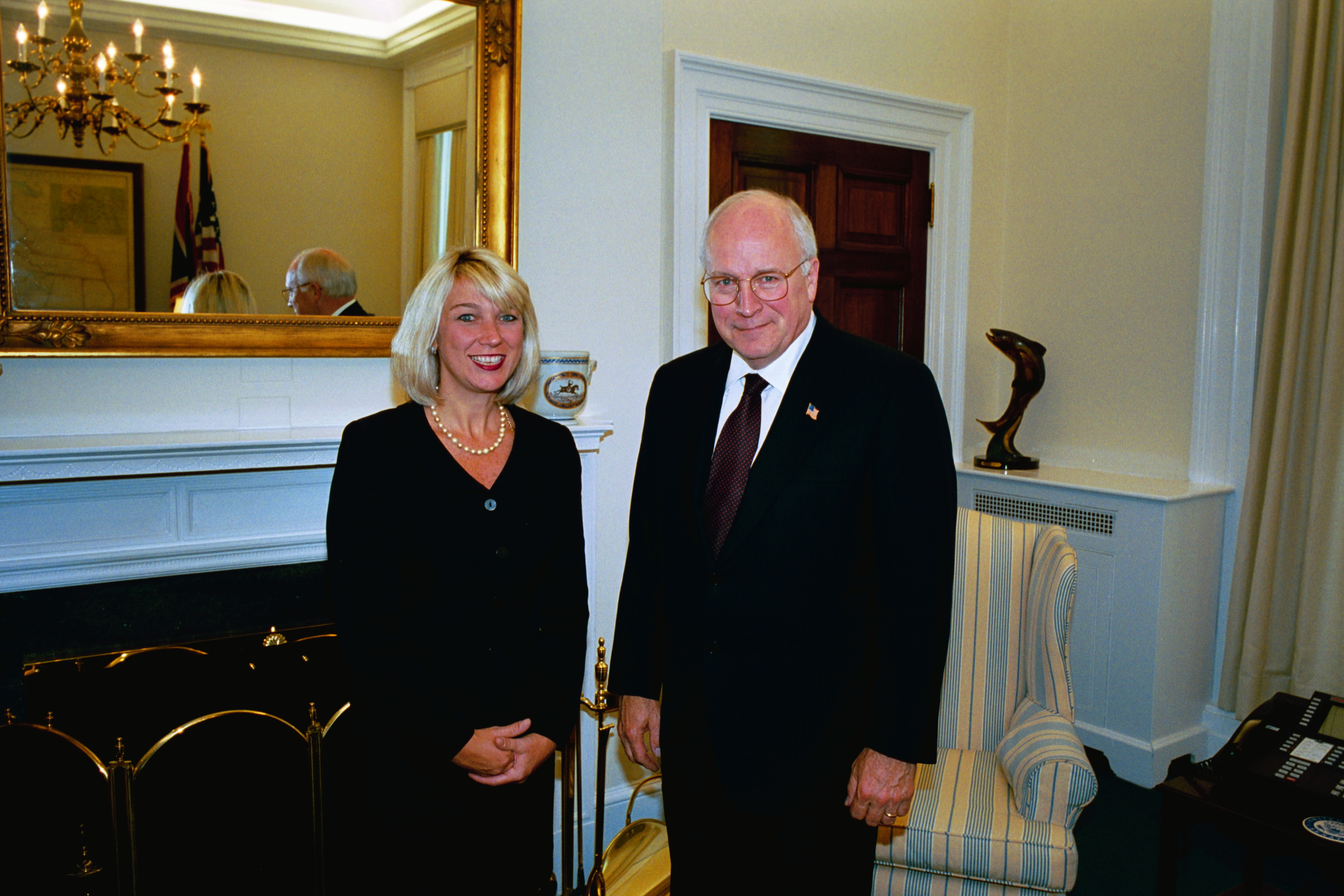
Fisher with Dick Cheney in 2003

From 2001 to 2003, Fisher was Deputy United States Assistant Attorney General for the Criminal Division.

Fisher served as Assistant Attorney General for the Criminal Division at the Department of Justice (DOJ) for three years—from 2005 until she resigned on May 23, 2008, She served as an Assistant Attorney General during President George W. Bush's second term. She was initially appointed in a recess appointment on August 31, 2005, to head the Criminal Division in the Department of Justice. Fisher was confirmed by the Senate on September 19, 2006 in a 61–35 vote.

=== Nomination, hearing and confirmation ===
Fisher was nominated on March 29, 2005, and her nomination was sent to the Senate April 4, 2005. Her nomination was stalled by Michigan Senator Carl Levin over his inquiry into interrogation tactics at the Guantanamo Bay, Cuba, naval facility. She was confirmed by the senate on September 19, 2006.

According to an August 15, 2005 The New York Times' article by Eric Lichtblau, Senate Democrats blocked Fisher's confirmation for about four months because of concerns over her "possible role in overseeing detention policies at Guantánamo Bay, Cuba". Fisher and the Justice Department say she never took part in such meetings." According to the Times article, Senator Arlen Specter said "in the interview on Friday [August 12, 2005,] that he had concerns about the depth of criminal prosecution experience at the top of the Justice Department after the departure of" Deputy Attorney General James B. Comey, who left in August 2005 to be Lockheed Martin's new general counsel. Comey had been "a veteran prosecutor in Manhattan...Judiciary Committee members said that for the first time in memory, none of the most senior officials at the Justice Department"—Attorney General Alberto R. Gonzales, Timothy E. Flanigan, Robert D. McCallum, Jr., or Alice Fisher "would have experience as a criminal prosecutor."

=== Tenure ===
One of Fisher's first major investigations at the DOJ was the Jack Abramoff Indian lobbying scandal which dealt with congressional corruption. In January 2006, Fisher announced a deal in which Abramoff, a Republican lobbyist, pleaded guilty to three felonies, including conspiracy to bribe public officials, in return for Abramoff's cooperation in the wide-ranging investigation into congressional corruption.

In 2006, after a four-year investigation, federal prosecutors recommended to Fisher that three top Purdue Pharma executives be indicted on felony charges, including conspiracy to defraud the United States, on the basis that the company knew about "significant" abuse of the drug OxyContin in the first years its introduction in 1996 and concealed that information. According to a May 25, 2018 CNBC article, Rudy Giuliani, who was representing Purdue at the time, held meetings with Fisher. Following these meetings, Fisher, along with others in the criminal division," made it clear that they did not support the indictments" chose not to pursue them.

In Florida in 2008, during the tenure of Fisher as AAG, then U.S. Attorney the Southern District of Florida, Alexander Acosta was overseeing a federal investigation into possible sex trafficking crimes by multimillionaire financier Jeffrey Epstein, which ended in a secret non-prosecution agreement under which Epstein pleaded guilty to lesser charges of soliciting a minor for prostitution in exchange for immunity from federal prosecution. Prosecutors never notified Epstein's victims of the existence of this agreement, despite being required to do so by the Crime Victims' Rights Act. Prior to the signing of the agreement, Epstein's lawyers lobbied Fisher and other DOJ officials multiple times in an unsuccessful effort to get them to drop the case. A subsequent lawsuit brought by Epstein's victims revealed extensive correspondence between his lawyers and the Justice Department, which showed that they also appealed to Fisher to argue against Acosta's stated intention to notify Epstein’s victims of the plea agreement. In an April 2008 letter to the DoJ, one of Epstein's lawyers wrote that the victim notification “letter was only halted by an eleventh-hour appeal to AAG Fisher.”

Fisher denied Starr's allegation and said in a statement, "I did not make any decisions related to victim notification and any statement to the contrary is demonstrably false."

After Epstein was arrested on charges of sex trafficking again in 2019, during a bail hearing, his lawyers unsuccessfully argued that the 2008 non-prosecution agreement should also apply in New York because it was made in consultation with senior officials at the Justice Department, and suggested those officials "endorsed the exercise of prosecutorial discretion that was at the heart" of the agreement. Fisher was among the senior DOJ officials they named as being involved. A spokeswoman for Fisher described the lawyer's comments as a "mischaracterization".

According to The Washington Post, Fisher's signature initiatives during her tenure included "a crackdown on corporate bribes and a new strategy to attack international organized crime."

== Speaking and publications ==
Fisher has published articles and spoken on criminal law topics such as the Criminalization of Corporate Conduct, the Foreign Corrupt Practices Act, government investigations, other international compliance issues and the legal industry.

== Notes ==
Legal offices
Preceded by Christopher Wray	Assistant Attorney General for the Criminal Division; 2005–2008	Succeeded by Lanny Breuer
