= Impeachment of Bill Clinton =

1998 US charging of president

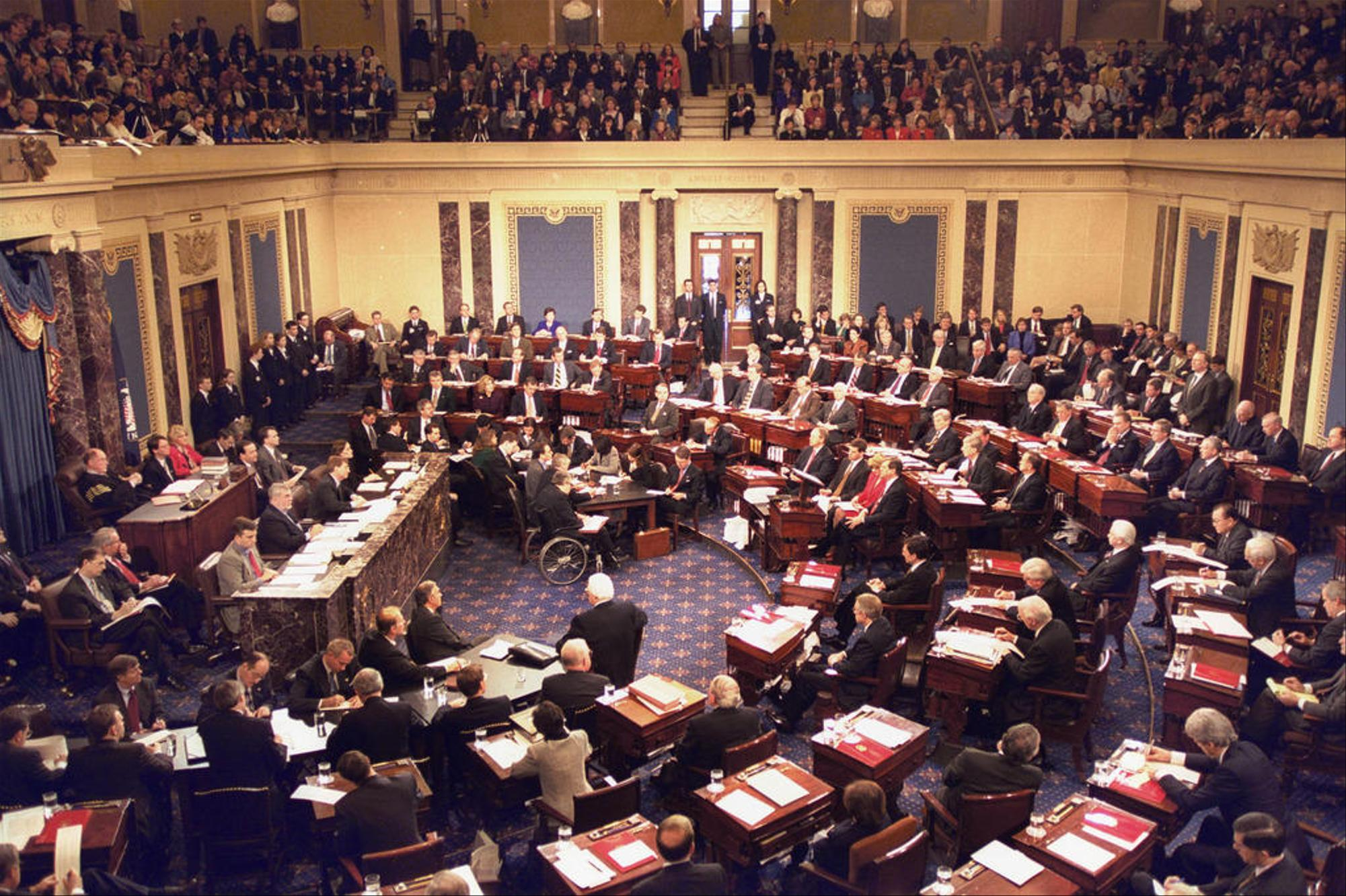
- Floor proceedings of the U.S. Senate during the trial of President Bill Clinton in 1999, Chief Justice William Rehnquist presiding
- Accused: Bill Clinton, 42nd president of the United States
- Proponents: Newt Gingrich (Speaker of the House of Representatives); Dick Armey (House Majority Leader); Tom DeLay (House Majority Whip)
- Date: December 19, 1998, to February 12, 1999
- Outcome: Acquitted by the U.S. Senate, remained in office
- Charges: Perjury (2), obstruction of justice, abuse of power
- Cause: Clinton's testimony denying that he had engaged in a sexual relationship with Monica Lewinsky in a sexual harassment lawsuit filed against Clinton by Paula Jones; allegations made in the Starr Report

Congressional votes

Voting in the U.S. House of Representatives
- Accusation: Perjury / grand jury
- Votes in favor: 228
- Votes against: 206
- Result: Approved
- Accusation: Perjury / Jones case
- Votes in favor: 205
- Votes against: 229
- Result: Rejected
- Accusation: Obstruction of justice
- Votes in favor: 221
- Votes against: 212
- Result: Approved
- Accusation: Abuse of power
- Votes in favor: 148
- Votes against: 285
- Result: Rejected

Voting in the U.S. Senate
- Accusation: Article I – perjury / grand jury
- Votes in favor: 45 "guilty"
- Votes against: 55 "not guilty"
- Result: Acquitted (67 "guilty" votes necessary for a conviction)
- Accusation: Article II – obstruction of justice
- Votes in favor: 50 "guilty"
- Votes against: 50 "not guilty"
- Result: Acquitted (67 "guilty" votes necessary for a conviction)

Bill Clinton, the 42nd president of the United States, was impeached by the United States House of Representatives of the 105th United States Congress on December 19, 1998. The House adopted two articles of impeachment against Clinton, with the specific charges against Clinton being lying under oath and obstruction of justice. Two other articles had been considered but were rejected by the House vote.

Clinton's impeachment came after a formal House inquiry, which had been launched on October 8, 1998. The charges for which Clinton was impeached stemmed from a sexual harassment lawsuit filed against Clinton by Paula Jones. During pre-trial discovery in the lawsuit, Clinton gave testimony denying that he had engaged in a sexual relationship with White House intern Monica Lewinsky. The catalyst for the president's impeachment was the Starr Report, a September 1998 report prepared by Ken Starr, Independent Counsel, for the House Judiciary Committee. The Starr Report included details outlining a sexual relationship between Clinton and Lewinsky. Clinton was the second American president to be impeached, the first being Andrew Johnson, who was impeached in 1868. (Note: Prior to Bill Clinton, the only other U.S. president aside from Andrew Johnson to be the subject of formal House impeachment proceedings was Richard Nixon in 1973–74, but he resigned from the presidency on August 9, 1974, before the House voted on his impeachment.)

The approved articles of impeachment were submitted to the United States Senate on January 7, 1999. A trial in the Senate then began, with Chief Justice William Rehnquist presiding. On February 12, Clinton was acquitted on both counts as neither received the necessary two-thirds majority vote of the senators present for conviction and removal from office—in this instance 67 votes were needed. On Article One, 45 senators voted to convict while 55 voted for acquittal. On Article Two, 50 senators voted to convict while 50 voted for acquittal. Clinton remained in office for the remainder of his second term.

== Background ==
In 1994, Paula Jones filed a lawsuit accusing Clinton of sexual harassment when he was governor of Arkansas. Clinton attempted to delay a trial until after he left office, but in May 1997 the Supreme Court unanimously rejected Clinton's claim that the Constitution immunized him from civil lawsuits, and shortly thereafter the pre-trial discovery process commenced.

Separate from this, in January 1994, Attorney General Janet Reno appointed Robert B. Fiske as an Independent counsel to investigate the Whitewater controversy. In August of that year, Ken Starr was appointed to replace Fiske in this role.

In 1997, the first effort in Congress to start an impeachment against Clinton was launched by Republican congressman Bob Barr.

In a January 17, 1998, sworn deposition, Clinton denied having a "sexual relationship", "sexual affair", or "sexual relations" with Lewinsky. His lawyer, Robert S. Bennett, stated with Clinton present that Lewinsky's affidavit showed there was no sex in any manner, shape or form between Clinton and Lewinsky. The Starr Report states that the following day, Clinton "coached" his secretary Betty Currie into repeating his denials should she be called to testify.

Remarks including response to Clinton–Lewinsky scandal (January 26, 1998)
Bill Clinton makes a presentation that ends with a short commentary on the Clinton–Lewinsky scandal. The presentation is known for the quote "I did not have sexual relations with that woman, Miss Lewinsky." (6:22)

Remarks including response to the Clinton–Lewinsky scandal (January 26, 1998)
audio-only version

After rumors of the scandal reached the news, Clinton publicly said, "I did not have sexual relations with that woman, Miss Lewinsky." But months later, Clinton admitted his relationship with Lewinsky was "wrong" and "not appropriate". Lewinsky engaged in oral sex with Clinton several times.

One of Clinton's defenses against the charges was claiming his testimony had been dismissed in the Jones case because the judge had ruled it immaterial to her lawsuit. The media and other defenders picked up on this and reported this as fact. However, as noted in Hofstra Law Review citing Judge Wright's contempt ruling and referral to the Arkansas Bar for disbarment:

"Effectively taking judicial notice of the "immateriality" spin which Clinton defenders had put on that ruling, Judge Wright later expressly held that "contrary to numerous assertions, this Court did not rule that evidence of the Lewinsky matter was irrelevant or immaterial to the issues in plaintiff's case."' Judge Wright repeated "that such evidence might have been relevant to plaintiff's case," probative to "'establish, among other things, intent, absence of mistake, motive, and habit on the part of the President." Jones vs Clinton 993 F. Supp. 1217, 1222 (E.D. Ark. 1998) Judge Wright ruling

The Starr Report was released to Congress on September 9, 1998, and to the public on September 11. In the report, Starr argued that there were eleven possible grounds for impeachment of Clinton, including perjury, obstruction of justice, witness tampering, and abuse of power. The report also detailed explicit and graphic details of the sexual relationship between Clinton and Lewinsky.

== Independent counsel investigation ==
The charges arose from an investigation by Ken Starr, an Independent Counsel. With the approval of United States Attorney General Janet Reno, Starr conducted a wide-ranging investigation of alleged abuses, including the Whitewater controversy, the firing of White House travel agents, and the alleged misuse of FBI files. On January 12, 1998, Linda Tripp, who had been working with Jones's lawyers, informed Starr that Lewinsky was preparing to commit perjury in the Jones case and had asked Tripp to do the same. She also said Clinton's friend Vernon Jordan was assisting Lewinsky. Based on the connection to Jordan, who was under scrutiny in the Whitewater probe, Starr obtained approval from Reno to expand his investigation into whether Lewinsky and others were breaking the law.

A much-quoted statement from Clinton's grand jury testimony showed him questioning the precise use of the word "is". Contending his statement that "there's nothing going on between us" had been truthful because he had no ongoing relationship with Lewinsky at the time he was questioned, Clinton said, "It depends upon what the meaning of the word 'is' is. If the—if he—if 'is' means is and never has been, that is not—that is one thing. If it means there is none, that was a completely true statement." Starr obtained further evidence of inappropriate behavior by seizing the computer hard drive and email records of Monica Lewinsky. Based on the president's conflicting testimony, Starr concluded that Clinton had committed perjury. Starr submitted his findings to Congress in a lengthy document, the Starr Report, which was released to the public via the Internet a few days later and included descriptions of encounters between Clinton and Lewinsky. Starr was criticized by Democrats for spending $70 million on the investigation. Critics of Starr also contend that his investigation was highly politicized because it regularly leaked tidbits of information to the press in violation of legal ethics, and because his report included lengthy descriptions which were humiliating and irrelevant to the legal case.

== Impeachment inquiry by the House Committee on the Judiciary ==
On October 8, 1998, the United States House of Representatives voted to authorize a broad impeachment inquiry, thereby initiating the impeachment process. The Republican controlled House of Representatives had decided this with a bipartisan vote of 258–176, with 31 Democrats joining Republicans. Since Ken Starr had already completed an extensive investigation, the House Judiciary Committee conducted no investigations of its own into Clinton's alleged wrongdoing and held no serious impeachment-related hearings before the 1998 midterm elections. Impeachment was one of the major issues in those elections.

In the November 1998 House elections, the Democrats picked up five seats in the House, but the Republicans still maintained majority control. The results went against what House Speaker Newt Gingrich predicted, who, before the election, had been reassured by private polling that Clinton's scandal would result in Republican gains of up to thirty House seats. Shortly after the elections, Gingrich, who had been one of the leading advocates for impeachment, announced he would resign from Congress as soon as he was able to find somebody to fill his vacant seat; Gingrich fulfilled this pledge, and officially resigned from Congress on January 3, 1999.

Impeachment proceedings were held during the post-election, "lame duck" session of the outgoing 105th United States Congress. Unlike the case of the 1974 impeachment process against Richard Nixon, the committee hearings were perfunctory but the floor debate in the whole House was spirited on both sides. The Speaker-designate, Representative Bob Livingston, chosen by the Republican Party Conference to replace Gingrich as House Speaker, announced the end of his candidacy for Speaker and his resignation from Congress from the floor of the House after his own marital infidelity came to light. In the same speech, Livingston also encouraged Clinton to resign. Clinton chose to remain in office and urged Livingston to reconsider his resignation. Many other prominent Republican members of Congress (including Dan Burton, Helen Chenoweth, and Henry Hyde, the chief House manager of Clinton's trial in the Senate) had infidelities exposed about this time, all of whom voted for impeachment. Publisher Larry Flynt offered a reward for such information, and many supporters of Clinton accused Republicans of hypocrisy.

== Impeachment by House of Representatives ==
December 18, 1998: The House continued debate on four articles of impeachment against President Clinton for perjury, obstruction of justice and abuse of power.

On December 11, 1998, the House Judiciary Committee agreed to send four articles of impeachment to the full House for consideration. The vote on two articles, grand jury perjury and obstruction of justice, was 21–17, both along party lines. On the other, perjury in the Paula Jones case, the committee voted 20–18, with Republican Lindsey Graham joining with Democrats, in order to give President Clinton "the legal benefit of the doubt". The next day, December 12, the committee agreed to send a fourth and final article, for abuse of power, to the full House by a 21–17 vote, again, along party lines.

Although proceedings were delayed due to the bombing of Iraq, on the passage of H. Res. 611, Clinton was impeached by the House of Representatives on December 19, 1998, on grounds of perjury to a grand jury (first article, 228–206) and obstruction of justice (third article, 221–212). The two other articles were rejected, the count of perjury in the Jones case (second article, 205–229) and abuse of power (fourth article, 148–285). Clinton thus became the second U.S. president to be impeached; the first, Andrew Johnson, was impeached in 1868. The only other previous U.S. president to be the subject of formal House impeachment proceedings was Richard Nixon in 1973–74. The Judiciary Committee agreed to a resolution containing three articles of impeachment in July 1974, but Nixon resigned from office soon thereafter, before the House took up the resolution.

H. Res. 611 – Impeaching President Bill Clinton December 19, 1998
First article (perjury / grand jury)	Party			Total votes
First article (perjury / grand jury)	Democratic	Republican	Independent	Total votes
Yea	5	223	0	228
Nay	200	5	1	206
Second article (perjury / Jones case)	Party			Total votes
Second article (perjury / Jones case)	Democratic	Republican	Independent	Total votes
Yea	5	200	0	205
Nay	200	28	1	229
Third article (obstruction of justice)	Party			Total votes
Third article (obstruction of justice)	Democratic	Republican	Independent	Total votes
Yea	5	216	0	221
Nay	199	12	1	212
Fourth article (abuse of power)	Party			Total votes
Fourth article (abuse of power)	Democratic	Republican	Independent	Total votes
Yea	1	147	0	148
Nay	203	81	1	285

Five Democrats (Virgil Goode, Ralph Hall, Paul McHale, Charles Stenholm and Gene Taylor) voted for the first three articles of impeachment, but only Taylor voted for the abuse of power charge. Five Republicans (Amo Houghton, Peter King, Connie Morella, Chris Shays and Mark Souder) voted against the first perjury charge. Eight more Republicans (Sherwood Boehlert, Michael Castle, Phil English, Nancy Johnson, Jay Kim, Jim Leach, John McHugh and Ralph Regula), but not Souder, voted against the obstruction charge. Twenty-eight Republicans voted against the second perjury charge, sending it to defeat, and eighty-one voted against the abuse of power charge.

Votes by member
District	Member	Party	Votes on proposed articles			
District	Member	Party	1st (perjury/grand jury)	2nd (perjury/Jones case)	3rd (obstruction of justice)	4th (abuse of power)
Hawaii 1	Neil Abercrombie	D	Nay	Nay	Nay	Nay
New York 5	Gary Ackerman	D	Nay	Nay	Nay	Nay
Alabama 4	Robert Aderholt	R	Yea	Yea	Yea	Yea
Maine 1	Tom Allen	D	Nay	Nay	Did not vote	Did not vote
New Jersey 1	Rob Andrews	D	Nay	Nay	Nay	Nay
Texas 7	Bill Archer	R	Yea	Yea	Yea	Yea
Texas 26	Dick Armey	R	Yea	Yea	Yea	Yea
Alabama 6	Spencer Bachus	R	Yea	Yea	Yea	Yea
Kentucky 6	Scotty Baesler	D	Nay	Nay	Nay	Nay
Louisiana 6	Richard Baker	R	Yea	Yea	Yea	Yea
Maine 2	John Baldacci	D	Nay	Nay	Nay	Nay
North Carolina 10	Cass Ballenger	R	Yea	Yea	Yea	Yea
Michigan 5	James A. Barcia	D	Nay	Nay	Nay	Nay
Georgia 7	Bob Barr	R	Yea	Yea	Yea	Yea
Nebraska 3	Bill Barrett	R	Yea	Yea	Yea	Yea
Wisconsin 5	Tom Barrett	D	Nay	Nay	Nay	Nay
Maryland 6	Roscoe Bartlett	R	Yea	Yea	Yea	Yea
Texas 6	Joe Barton	R	Yea	Yea	Yea	Yea
New Hampshire 2	Charles Bass	R	Yea	Yea	Yea	Nay
Virginia 1	Herb Bateman	R	Yea	Yea	Yea	Yea
California 30	Xavier Becerra	D	Nay	Nay	Nay	Nay
Texas 25	Ken Bentsen	D	Nay	Nay	Nay	Nay
Nebraska 1	Doug Bereuter	R	Yea	Yea	Yea	Nay
California 26	Howard Berman	D	Nay	Nay	Nay	Nay
Arkansas 1	Marion Berry	D	Nay	Nay	Nay	Nay
California 49	Brian Bilbray	R	Yea	Yea	Yea	Nay
Florida 9	Michael Bilirakis	R	Yea	Yea	Yea	Yea
Georgia 2	Sanford Bishop	D	Nay	Nay	Nay	Nay
Illinois 5	Rod Blagojevich	D	Nay	Nay	Nay	Nay
Virginia 7	Thomas J. Bliley Jr.	R	Yea	Yea	Yea	Yea
Florida 9	Michael Bilirakis	R	Yea	Yea	Yea	Yea
Oregon 3	Earl Blumenauer	D	Nay	Nay	Nay	Nay
Missouri 7	Roy Blunt	R	Yea	Yea	Yea	Yea
New York 23	Sherwood Boehlert	R	Yea	Yea	Nay	Nay
Ohio 8	John Boehner	R	Yea	Yea	Yea	Yea
Texas 23	Henry Bonilla	R	Yea	Yea	Yea	Nay
Michigan 10	David Bonior	D	Nay	Nay	Nay	Nay
California 44	Mary Bono	R	Yea	Yea	Yea	Yea
Pennsylvania 3	Robert Borski	D	Nay	Nay	Nay	Nay
Iowa 3	Leonard Boswell	D	Nay	Nay	Nay	Nay
Virginia 9	Rick Boucher	D	Nay	Nay	Nay	Nay
Florida 2	Allen Boyd	D	Nay	Nay	Nay	Nay
Pennsylvania 1	Bob Brady	D	Nay	Nay	Nay	Nay
Texas 8	Kevin Brady	R	Yea	Yea	Yea	Yea
California 42	George Brown Jr.	D	Nay	Nay	Nay	Nay
Ohio 13	Sherrod Brown	D	Nay	Nay	Nay	Nay
Tennessee 7	Ed Bryant	R	Yea	Yea	Yea	Yea
Kentucky 4	Jim Bunning	R	Yea	Yea	Yea	Yea
North Carolina 5	Richard Burr	R	Yea	Nay	Yea	Nay
Indiana 6	Dan Burton	R	Yea	Yea	Yea	Yea
Indiana 5	Steve Buyer	R	Yea	Yea	Yea	Yea
Alabama 1	Sonny Callahan	R	Yea	Yea	Yea	Yea
California 43	Ken Calvert	R	Yea	Yea	Yea	Yea
Michigan 4	Dave Camp	R	Yea	Yea	Yea	Yea
California 15	Tom Campbell	R	Yea	Nay	Yea	Nay
Florida 12	Charles Canady	R	Yea	Yea	Yea	Yea
Utah 3	Chris Cannon	R	Yea	Yea	Yea	Yea
California 22	Lois Capps	D	Nay	Nay	Nay	Nay
Maryland 3	Ben Cardin	D	Nay	Nay	Nay	Nay
Indiana 10	Julia Carson	D	Nay	Nay	Nay	Nay
Delaware at-large	Mike Castle	R	Yea	Nay	Nay	Nay
Ohio 1	Steve Chabot	R	Yea	Yea	Yea	Yea
Georgia 8	Saxby Chambliss	R	Yea	Yea	Yea	Yea
Idaho 1	Helen Chenoweth	R	Yea	Yea	Yea	Yea
Nebraska 2	Jon Christensen	R	Yea	Yea	Yea	Yea
Michigan 1	Bill Clay	D	Nay	Nay	Nay	Nay
North Carolina 1	Eva Clayton	D	Nay	Nay	Nay	Nay
Tennessee 5	Bob Clement	D	Nay	Nay	Nay	Nay
South Carolina 6	Jim Clyburn	D	Nay	Nay	Nay	Nay
North Carolina 6	Howard Coble	R	Yea	Yea	Yea	Yea
Oklahoma 2	Tom Coburn	R	Yea	Yea	Yea	Yea
Georgia 3	Mac Collins	R	Yea	Yea	Yea	Yea
Texas 19	Larry Combest	R	Yea	Yea	Yea	Yea
California 18	Gary Condit	D	Nay	Nay	Nay	Nay
Michigan 14	John Conyers	D	Nay	Nay	Nay	Nay
Utah 2	Merrill Cook	R	Yea	Yea	Yea	Yea
Louisiana 5	John Cooksey	R	Yea	Yea	Yea	Yea
Illinois 12	Jerry Costello	D	Nay	Nay	Nay	Nay
California 47	Christopher Cox	R	Yea	Yea	Yea	Yea
Pennsylvania 14	William J. Coyne	D	Nay	Nay	Nay	Nay
Alabama 5	Bud Cramer	D	Nay	Nay	Nay	Nay
Illinois 8	Phil Crane	R	Yea	Yea	Yea	Yea
Idaho 2	Mike Crapo	R	Yea	Yea	Yea	Yea
Wyoming at-large	Barbara Cubin	R	Yea	Yea	Yea	Yea
Maryland 7	Elijah Cummings	D	Nay	Nay	Nay	Nay
California 51	Duke Cunningham	R	Yea	Yea	Yea	Yea
Missouri 6	Pat Danner	D	Nay	Nay	Nay	Nay
Florida 11	Jim Davis	D	Nay	Nay	Nay	Nay
Illinois 7	Danny K. Davis	D	Nay	Nay	Nay	Nay
Virginia 11	Tom Davis	R	Yea	Yea	Yea	Nay
Georgia 9	Nathan Deal	R	Yea	Yea	Yea	Yea
Oregon 4	Peter DeFazio	D	Nay	Nay	Nay	Nay
Colorado 1	Diana DeGette	D	Nay	Nay	Nay	Nay
Massachusetts 10	Bill Delahunt	D	Nay	Nay	Nay	Nay
Connecticut 3	Rosa DeLauro	D	Nay	Nay	Nay	Nay
Texas 22	Tom DeLay	R	Yea	Yea	Yea	Yea
Florida 20	Peter Deutsch	D	Nay	Nay	Nay	Nay
Florida 21	Lincoln Díaz-Balart	R	Yea	Yea	Yea	Yea
Arkansas 4	Jay Dickey	R	Yea	Nay	Yea	Nay
Washington 6	Norm Dicks	D	Nay	Nay	Nay	Nay
Michigan 16	John Dingell	D	Nay	Nay	Nay	Nay
California 32	Julian Dixon	D	Nay	Nay	Nay	Nay
Texas 10	Lloyd Doggett	D	Nay	Nay	Nay	Nay
California 20	Cal Dooley	D	Nay	Nay	Nay	Nay
California 4	John Doolittle	R	Yea	Yea	Yea	Yea
Pennsylvania 18	Mike Doyle	D	Nay	Nay	Nay	Nay
California 28	David Dreier	R	Yea	Yea	Yea	Yea
Tennessee 2	Jimmy Duncan	R	Yea	Yea	Yea	Yea
Washington 8	Jennifer Dunn	R	Yea	Yea	Yea	Yea
Texas 11	Chet Edwards	D	Nay	Nay	Nay	Nay
Michigan 3	Vern Ehlers	R	Yea	Yea	Yea	Yea
Maryland 2	Bob Ehrlich	R	Yea	Yea	Yea	Nay
Missouri 8	Jo Ann Emerson	R	Yea	Yea	Yea	Nay
New York 17	Eliot Engel	D	Nay	Nay	Nay	Nay
Pennsylvania 21	Phil English	R	Yea	Nay	Nay	Nay
Nevada 1	John Ensign	R	Yea	Nay	Yea	Nay
California 14	Anna Eshoo	D	Nay	Nay	Nay	Nay
North Carolina 2	Bob Etheridge	D	Nay	Nay	Nay	Nay
Illinois 17	Lane Evans	D	Nay	Nay	Nay	Nay
Alabama 2	Terry Everett	R	Yea	Yea	Yea	Yea
Illinois 15	Tom Ewing	R	Yea	Yea	Yea	Yea
California 17	Sam Farr	D	Nay	Nay	Nay	Nay
Pennsylvania 2	Chaka Fattah	D	Nay	Nay	Nay	Nay
Illinois 13	Harris Fawell	R	Yea	Yea	Yea	Nay
California 3	Vic Fazio	D	Nay	Nay	Nay	Nay
California 50	Bob Filner	D	Nay	Nay	Nay	Nay
Florida 16	Mark Foley	R	Yea	Nay	Yea	Nay
New York 1	Michael Forbes	R	Yea	Yea	Yea	Yea
Tennessee 9	Harold Ford Jr.	D	Nay	Nay	Nay	Nay
New York 13	Vito Fossella	R	Yea	Yea	Yea	Nay
Florida 4	Tillie Fowler	R	Yea	Yea	Yea	Yea
Pennsylvania 13	Jon D. Fox	R	Yea	Yea	Yea	Yea
Massachusetts 4	Barney Frank	D	Nay	Nay	Nay	Nay
New Jersey 7	Bob Franks	R	Yea	Yea	Yea	Nay
New Jersey 11	Rodney Frelinghuysen	R	Yea	Yea	Yea	Nay
Texas 24	Martin Frost	D	Nay	Nay	Nay	Nay
Oregon 1	Elizabeth Furse	D	Nay	Nay	Nay	Nay
California 23	Elton Gallegly	R	Yea	Yea	Yea	Yea
Iowa 4	Greg Ganske	R	Yea	Yea	Yea	Nay
Connecticut 2	Sam Gejdenson	D	Nay	Nay	Nay	Nay
Pennsylvania 17	George Gekas	R	Yea	Yea	Yea	Yea
Missouri 3	Dick Gephardt	D	Nay	Nay	Nay	Nay
Nevada 2	Jim Gibbons	R	Yea	Nay	Yea	Yea
Maryland 1	Wayne Gilchrest	R	Yea	Yea	Yea	Nay
Ohio 5	Paul Gillmor	R	Yea	Yea	Yea	Nay
New York 20	Benjamin Gilman	R	Yea	Nay	Yea	Nay
Georgia 6	Newt Gingrich	R	Yea	Yea	Yea	Yea
Texas 20	Henry B. González	D	Nay	Nay	Nay	Nay
Virginia 5	Virgil Goode	D	Yea	Yea	Yea	Nay
Virginia 6	Bob Goodlatte	R	Yea	Yea	Yea	Yea
Pennsylvania 19	Bill Goodling	R	Yea	Yea	Yea	Yea
Tennessee 6	Bart Gordon	D	Nay	Nay	Nay	Nay
Florida 14	Porter Goss	R	Yea	Yea	Yea	Nay
South Carolina 3	Lindsey Graham	R	Yea	Nay	Yea	Yea
Texas 12	Kay Granger	R	Yea	Yea	Yea	Nay
Texas 29	Gene Greene	D	Nay	Nay	Nay	Nay
Pennsylvania 8	Jim Greenwood	R	Yea	Nay	Yea	Nay
Illinois 4	Luis Gutiérrez	D	Nay	Nay	Nay	Nay
Minnesota 1	Gil Gutknecht	R	Yea	Yea	Yea	Yea
Ohio 3	Tony P. Hall	D	Nay	Nay	Nay	Nay
Texas 4	Ralph Hall	D	Yea	Yea	Yea	Nay
Indiana 9	Lee Hamilton	D	Nay	Nay	Nay	Nay
Utah 1	Jim Hansen	R	Yea	Yea	Yea	Yea
California 36	Jane Harman	D	Nay	Nay	Nay	Nay
Illinois 14	Dennis Hastert	R	Yea	Yea	Yea	Yea
Florida 23	Alcee Hastings	D	Nay	Nay	Nay	Nay
Washington 4	Doc Hastings	R	Yea	Yea	Yea	Yea
Arizona 6	J. D. Hayworth	R	Yea	Yea	Yea	Yea
Colorado 5	Joel Hefley	R	Yea	Yea	Yea	Nay
North Carolina 8	Bill Hefner	D	Nay	Nay	Nay	Nay
California 2	Wally Herger	R	Yea	Yea	Yea	Yea
Montana at-large	Rick Hill	R	Yea	Yea	Yea	Nay
Tennessee 4	Van Hilleary	R	Yea	Yea	Yea	Yea
Alabama 7	Earl Hilliard Sr.	D	Nay	Nay	Nay	Nay
New York 26	Maurice Hinchey	D	Nay	Nay	Nay	Nay
Texas 15	Rubén Hinojosa	D	Nay	Nay	Nay	Nay
Ohio 7	Dave Hobson	R	Yea	Nay	Yea	Nay
Michigan 2	Pete Hoekstra	R	Yea	Yea	Yea	Yea
Pennsylvania 6	Tim Holden	D	Nay	Nay	Nay	Nay
Oregon 5	Darlene Hooley	D	Nay	Nay	Nay	Nay
California 38	Steve Horn	R	Yea	Yea	Yea	Yea
Indiana 8	John Hostettler	R	Yea	Yea	Yea	Yea
New York 31	Amo Houghton	R	Nay	Nay	Nay	Nay
Maryland 5	Steny Hoyer	D	Nay	Nay	Nay	Nay
Missouri 9	Kenny Hulshof	R	Yea	Yea	Yea	Nay
California 52	Duncan L. Hunter	R	Yea	Yea	Yea	Yea
Arkansas 3	Asa Hutchinson	R	Yea	Yea	Yea	Yea
Illinois 6	Henry Hyde	R	Yea	Yea	Yea	Yea
South Carolina 4	Bob Inglis	R	Yea	Yea	Yea	Yea
Oklahoma 5	Ernest Istook	R	Yea	Yea	Yea	Yea
Illinois 2	Jesse Jackson Jr.	D	Nay	Nay	Nay	Nay
Texas 18	Sheila Jackson Lee	D	Nay	Nay	Nay	Nay
Louisiana 2	William Jefferson	D	Nay	Nay	Nay	Nay
Tennessee 1	Bill Jenkins	R	Yea	Yea	Yea	Nay
Louisiana 7	Chris John	D	Nay	Nay	Nay	Nay
Connecticut 6	Nancy Johnson	R	Yea	Yea	Nay	Nay
Wisconsin 8	Jay Johnson	D	Nay	Nay	Nay	Nay
Texas 30	Eddie Bernice Johnson	D	Nay	Nay	Nay	Nay
Texas 3	Sam Johnson	R	Yea	Yea	Yea	Yea
North Carolina 3	Walter B. Jones Jr.	R	Yea	Yea	Yea	Yea
Pennsylvania 11	Paul Kanjorski	D	Nay	Nay	Nay	Nay
Ohio 9	Marcy Kaptur	D	Nay	Nay	Nay	Nay
Ohio 12	John Kasich	R	Yea	Yea	Yea	Nay
New York 19	Sue Kelly	R	Yea	Nay	Yea	Nay
Massachusetts 8	Joseph P. Kennedy II	D	Nay	Nay	Nay	Nay
Rhode Island 1	Patrick J. Kennedy	D	Nay	Nay	Nay	Nay
Connecticut 1	Barbara B. Kennelly	D	Nay	Nay	Nay	Nay
Michigan 9	Dale Kildee	D	Nay	Nay	Nay	Nay
Michigan 15	Carolyn Cheeks Kilpatrick	D	Nay	Nay	Nay	Nay
California 41	Jay Kim	R	Yea	Nay	Nay	Nay
Wisconsin 3	Ron Kind	D	Nay	Nay	Nay	Nay
New York 3	Peter King	R	Nay	Nay	Nay	Nay
Georgia 1	Jack Kingston	R	Yea	Yea	Yea	Yea
Wisconsin 4	Jerry Kleczka	D	Nay	Nay	Nay	Nay
Pennsylvania 4	Ron Klink	D	Nay	Nay	Nay	Nay
Wisconsin 2	Scott Klug	R	Yea	Nay	Yea	Nay
Michigan 11	Joe Knollenberg	R	Yea	Yea	Yea	Yea
Arizona 5	Jim Kolbe	R	Yea	Yea	Yea	Nay
Ohio 10	Dennis Kucinich	D	Nay	Nay	Nay	Nay
New York 29	John LaFalce	D	Nay	Nay	Nay	Nay
Illinois 18	Ray LaHood	R	Yea	Yea	Yea	Yea
Texas 9	Nick Lampson	D	Nay	Nay	Nay	Nay
California 12	Tom Lantos	D	Nay	Nay	Nay	Nay
Oklahoma 1	Steve Largent	R	Yea	Yea	Yea	Nay
Iowa 5	Tom Latham	R	Yea	Yea	Yea	Nay
Ohio 19	Steve LaTourette	R	Yea	Yea	Yea	Nay
New York 2	Rick Lazio	R	Yea	Nay	Yea	Nay
Iowa 1	Jim Leach	R	Yea	Yea	Nay	Nay
California 9	Barbara Lee	D	Nay	Nay	Nay	Nay
Michigan 12	Sander Levin	D	Nay	Nay	Nay	Nay
California 40	Jerry Lewis	R	Yea	Yea	Yea	Yea
Georgia 5	John Lewis	D	Nay	Nay	Nay	Nay
Kentucky 2	Ron Lewis	R	Yea	Yea	Yea	Yea
Georgia 11	John Linder	R	Yea	Yea	Yea	Yea
Illinois 3	Bill Lipinski	D	Nay	Nay	Nay	Nay
Louisiana 1	Bob Livingston	R	Yea	Yea	Yea	Yea
New Jersey 2	Frank LoBiondo	R	Yea	Yea	Yea	Nay
California 16	Zoe Lofgren	D	Nay	Nay	Nay	Nay
New York 18	Nita Lowey	D	Nay	Nay	Nay	Nay
Oklahoma 6	Frank Lucas	R	Yea	Yea	Yea	Yea
Minnesota 6	Bill Luther	D	Nay	Nay	Nay	Nay
Connecticut 5	James H. Maloney	D	Nay	Nay	Nay	Nay
New York 14	Carolyn Maloney	D	Nay	Nay	Nay	Nay
New York 7	Tomas Manton	D	Nay	Nay	Nay	Nay
Illinois 16	Don Manzullo	R	Yea	Yea	Yea	Yea
Massachusetts 7	Ed Markey	D	Nay	Nay	Nay	Nay
California 31	Matthew G. Martínez	D	Nay	Nay	Nay	Nay
Pennsylvania 20	Frank Mascara	D	Nay	Nay	Nay	Nay
California 5	Bob Matsui	D	Nay	Nay	Nay	Nay
Missouri 5	Karen McCarthy	D	Nay	Nay	Nay	Nay
New York 4	Carolyn McCarthy	D	Nay	Nay	Nay	Nay
Florida 8	Bill McCollum	R	Yea	Yea	Yea	Yea
Louisiana 4	Jim McCrery	R	Yea	Yea	Yea	Nay
Pennsylvania 10	Joseph M. McDade	R	Yea	Yea	Yea	Yea
Washington 7	Jim McDermott	D	Nay	Nay	Nay	Nay
Massachusetts 3	Jim McGovern	D	Nay	Nay	Nay	Nay
Pennsylvania 15	Paul McHale	D	Yea	Yea	Yea	Nay
New York 24	John M. McHugh	R	Yea	Yea	Nay	Nay
Colorado 3	Scott McInnis	R	Yea	Yea	Yea	Nay
Indiana 2	David McIntosh	R	Yea	Yea	Yea	Nay
North Carolina 7	Mike McIntyre	D	Nay	Nay	Nay	Nay
California 25	Buck McKeon	R	Yea	Yea	Yea	Yea
Georgia 4	Cynthia McKinney	D	Nay	Nay	Nay	Nay
New York 21	Michael McNulty	D	Nay	Nay	Nay	Nay
Massachusetts 4	Marty Meehan	D	Nay	Nay	Nay	Nay
Florida 17	Carrie Meek	D	Nay	Nay	Nay	Nay
New York 6	Gregory Meeks	D	Nay	Nay	Nay	Nay
New Jersey 13	Bob Menendez	D	Nay	Nay	Nay	Nay
Washington 2	Jack Metcalf	R	Yea	Yea	Yea	Yea
Florida 7	John Mica	R	Yea	Yea	Yea	Yea
California 37	Juanita Millender-McDonald	D	Nay	Nay	Nay	Nay
California 7	George Miller	D	Did not vote	Did not vote	Did not vote	Did not vote
Florida 13	Dan Miller	R	Yea	Yea	Yea	Yea
Minnesota 2	David Minge	D	Nay	Nay	Nay	Nay
Hawaii 2	Patsy Mink	D	Nay	Nay	Nay	Nay
Massachusetts 9	Joe Moakley	D	Nay	Nay	Nay	Nay
West Virginia 1	Alan Mollohan	D	Nay	Nay	Nay	Nay
Kansas 1	Jerry Moran	R	Yea	Yea	Yea	Nay
Virginia 8	Jim Moran	D	Nay	Nay	Nay	Nay
Maryland 8	Connie Morella	R	Nay	Nay	Nay	Nay
Pennsylvania 12	John Murtha	D	Nay	Nay	Nay	Nay
North Carolina 9	Sue Myrick	R	Yea	Yea	Yea	Yea
New York 8	Jerry Nadler	D	Nay	Nay	Nay	Nay
Massachusetts 2	Richard Neal	D	Nay	Nay	Nay	Nay
Washington 5	George Nethercutt	R	Yea	Yea	Yea	Nay
Wisconsin 1	Mark Neumann	R	Yea	Yea	Yea	Yea
Ohio 18	Bob Ney	R	Yea	Nay	Yea	Nay
Kentucky 3	Anne Northup	R	Yea	Yea	Yea	Nay
Georgia 10	Charlie Norwood	R	Yea	Yea	Yea	Yea
Iowa 2	Jim Nussle	R	Yea	Yea	Yea	Yea
Michigan 8	Jim Oberstar	D	Nay	Nay	Nay	Nay
Wisconsin 7	Dave Obey	D	Nay	Nay	Nay	Nay
Massachusetts 1	John Olver	D	Nay	Nay	Nay	Nay
Texas 27	Solomon Ortiz	D	Nay	Nay	Nay	Nay
New York 11	Major Owens	D	Nay	Nay	Nay	Nay
Ohio 4	Mike Oxley	R	Yea	Yea	Yea	Yea
California 48	Ron Packard	R	Yea	Yea	Yea	Yea
New Jersey 6	Frank Pallone	D	Nay	Nay	Nay	Nay
New Jersey 12	Mike Pappas	R	Yea	Yea	Yea	Yea
Missouri 4	Michael Parker	R	Yea	Yea	Yea	Nay
New Jersey 8	Bill Pascrell	D	Nay	Nay	Nay	Nay
Arizona 2	Ed Pastor	D	Nay	Nay	Nay	Nay
Texas 14	Ron Paul	R	Yea	Yea	Yea	Yea
Texas 27	Bill Paxon	R	Yea	Yea	Yea	Yea
New Jersey 10	Donald M. Payne	D	Nay	Nay	Nay	Nay
Indiana 7	Ed Pease	R	Yea	Yea	Yea	Yea
California 8	Nancy Pelosi	D	Nay	Nay	Nay	Nay
Minnesota 7	Collin Peterson	D	Nay	Nay	Nay	Nay
Pennsylvania 5	John Peterson	R	Yea	Yea	Yea	Yea
Wisconsin 6	Tom Petri	R	Yea	Yea	Yea	Nay
Missouri 3	Chip Pickering	R	Yea	Yea	Yea	Yea
Virginia 2	Owen B. Pickett	D	Nay	Nay	Nay	Nay
Pennsylvania 16	Joe Pitts	R	Yea	Yea	Yea	Yea
California 11	Richard Pombo	R	Yea	Yea	Yea	Yea
North Dakota at-large	Earl Pomeroy	D	Nay	Nay	Nay	Nay
Illinois 10	John Porter	R	Yea	Yea	Yea	Nay
Ohio 2	Rob Portman	R	Yea	Yea	Yea	Nay
Illinois 19	Glenn Poshard	D	Nay	Nay	Nay	Nay
North Carolina 4	David Price	D	Nay	Nay	Nay	Nay
Ohio 15	Deborah Pryce	R	Yea	Nay	Yea	Nay
New York 30	Jack Quinn	R	Yea	Yea	Yea	Nay
California 19	George Radanovich	R	Yea	Yea	Yea	Yea
West Virginia 3	Nick Rahall	D	Nay	Nay	Nay	Nay
Minnesota 3	Jim Ramstad	R	Yea	Nay	Yea	Nay
New York 15	Charles Rangel	D	Nay	Nay	Nay	Nay
New Mexico 3	Bill Redmond	R	Yea	Yea	Yea	Yea
Ohio 16	Ralph Regula	R	Yea	Yea	Nay	Nay
Texas 16	Silvestre Reyes	D	Nay	Nay	Nay	Nay
California 1	Frank Riggs	R	Yea	Yea	Yea	Nay
Alabama 3	Bob Riley	R	Yea	Yea	Yea	Yea
Michigan 13	Lynn Rivers	D	Nay	Nay	Nay	Nay
Texas 28	Ciro Rodriguez	D	Nay	Nay	Nay	Nay
Indiana 3	Tim Roemer	D	Nay	Nay	Nay	Nay
California 27	James E. Rogan	R	Yea	Yea	Yea	Yea
Kentucky 5	Hal Rogers	R	Yea	Yea	Yea	Nay
California 45	Dana Rohrabacher	R	Yea	Yea	Yea	Yea
Florida 18	Ileana Ros-Lehtinen	R	Yea	Yea	Yea	Yea
New Jersey 9	Steve Rothman	D	Nay	Nay	Nay	Nay
New Jersey 5	Marge Roukema	R	Yea	Yea	Yea	Yea
California 33	Lucille Roybal-Allard	D	Nay	Nay	Nay	Nay
California 39	Ed Royce	R	Yea	Yea	Yea	Yea
Illinois 1	Bobby Rush	D	Nay	Nay	Nay	Nay
Kansas 2	Jim Ryun	R	Yea	Yea	Yea	Yea
Minnesota 5	Martin Olav Sabo	D	Nay	Nay	Nay	Nay
Arizona 1	Matt Salmon	R	Yea	Yea	Yea	Yea
California 46	Loretta Sanchez	D	Nay	Nay	Nay	Nay
Vermont at-large	Bernie Sanders	I	Nay	Nay	Nay	Nay
Texas 1	Max Sandlin	D	Nay	Nay	Nay	Nay
South Carolina 1	Mark Sanford	R	Yea	Nay	Yea	Yea
Ohio 14	Tom Sawyer	D	Nay	Nay	Nay	Nay
New Jersey 3	Jim Saxton	R	Yea	Yea	Yea	Nay
Florida 1	Joe Scarborough	R	Yea	Nay	Yea	Nay
Colorado 6	Daniel Schaefer	R	Yea	Yea	Yea	Yea
Colorado 4	Bob Schaffer	R	Yea	Yea	Yea	Yea
New York 9	Chuck Schumer	D	Nay	Nay	Nay	Nay
Virginia 3	Bobby Scott	D	Nay	Nay	Nay	Nay
Wisconsin 9	Jim Sensenbrenner	R	Yea	Yea	Yea	Yea
New York 16	José E. Serrano	D	Nay	Nay	Nay	Nay
Texas 5	Pete Sessions	R	Yea	Yea	Yea	Yea
Arizona 4	John Shadegg	R	Yea	Yea	Yea	Nay
Florida 22	Clay Shaw	R	Yea	Nay	Yea	Nay
Connecticut 4	Chris Shays	R	Nay	Nay	Nay	Nay
California 14	Brad Sherman	D	Nay	Nay	Nay	Nay
Illinois 20	John Shimkus	R	Yea	Yea	Yea	Nay
Pennsylvania 9	Bud Shuster	R	Yea	Nay	Yea	Nay
Virginia 4	Norman Sisisky	D	Nay	Nay	Nay	Nay
Colorado 2	David Skaggs	D	Nay	Nay	Nay	Nay
New Mexico 2	Joe Skeen	R	Yea	Yea	Yea	Yea
Missouri 4	Ike Skelton	D	Nay	Nay	Nay	Nay
New York 28	Louise Slaughter	D	Nay	Nay	Nay	Nay
Michigan 7	Nick Smith	R	Yea	Yea	Yea	Yea
New Jersey 7	Chris Smith	R	Yea	Yea	Yea	Yea
Oregon 2	Bob Smith	R	Yea	Yea	Yea	Yea
Texas 21	Lamar Smith	R	Yea	Yea	Yea	Yea
Washington 9	Adam Smith	D	Nay	Nay	Nay	Nay
Washington 3	Linda Smith	R	Yea	Yea	Yea	Yea
Kansas 3	Vince Snowbarger	R	Yea	Yea	Yea	Yea
Arkansas 2	Vic Snyder	D	Nay	Nay	Nay	Nay
New York 22	Gerald Solomon	R	Yea	Yea	Yea	Yea
Indiana 4	Mark Souder	R	Nay	Nay	Yea	Nay
South Carolina 2	Floyd Spence	R	Yea	Yea	Yea	Yea
South Carolina 5	John Spratt	D	Nay	Nay	Nay	Nay
Michigan 8	Debbie Stabenow	D	Nay	Nay	Nay	Nay
California 13	Pete Stark	D	Nay	Nay	Nay	Nay
Florida 6	Cliff Stearns	R	Yea	Yea	Yea	Yea
Texas 17	Charles Stenholm	D	Yea	Yea	Yea	Nay
Ohio 11	Louis Stokes	D	Nay	Nay	Nay	Nay
Ohio 6	Ted Strickland	D	Nay	Nay	Nay	Nay
Arizona 3	Bob Stump	R	Yea	Yea	Yea	Yea
Michigan 1	Bob Stupak	D	Nay	Nay	Nay	Nay
New Hampshire 1	John E. Sununu	R	Yea	Yea	Yea	Yea
Missouri 2	Jim Talent	R	Yea	Yea	Yea	Yea
Tennessee 8	John Tanner	D	Nay	Nay	Nay	Nay
California 10	Ellen Tauscher	D	Nay	Nay	Nay	Nay
Louisiana 3	Billy Tauzin	R	Yea	Yea	Yea	Nay
Mississippi 5	Gene Taylor	D	Yea	Yea	Yea	Yea
North Carolina 11	Charles Taylor	R	Yea	Yea	Yea	Yea
California 21	Bill Thomas	R	Yea	Yea	Yea	Yea
Mississippi 2	Bennie Thompson	D	Nay	Nay	Nay	Nay
Texas 13	Mac Thornberry	R	Yea	Yea	Yea	Nay
South Dakota at-large	John Thune	R	Yea	Yea	Yea	Nay
Florida 5	Karen Thurman	D	Nay	Nay	Nay	Nay
Kansas 4	Todd Tiahrt	R	Yea	Yea	Yea	Yea
Massachusetts 6	John F. Tierney	D	Nay	Nay	Nay	Nay
California 34	Esteban Torres	D	Nay	Nay	Nay	Nay
New York 10	Edolphus Towns	D	Nay	Nay	Nay	Nay
Ohio 17	James Traficant	D	Nay	Nay	Nay	Nay
Texas 2	Jim Turner	D	Nay	Nay	Nay	Nay
Michigan 6	Fred Upton	R	Yea	Yea	Yea	Nay
New York 12	Nydia Velázquez	D	Nay	Nay	Nay	Nay
Minnesota 4	Bruce Vento	D	Nay	Nay	Nay	Nay
Indiana 1	Pete Visclosky	D	Nay	Nay	Nay	Nay
New York 25	James T. Walsh	R	Yea	Yea	Yea	Nay
Tennessee 3	Zach Wamp	R	Yea	Yea	Yea	Yea
California 35	Maxine Waters	D	Nay	Nay	Nay	Nay
Oklahoma 3	Wes Watkins	R	Yea	Yea	Yea	Yea
North Carolina 12	Mel Watt	D	Nay	Nay	Nay	Nay
Oklahoma 4	J. C. Watts	R	Yea	Yea	Yea	Yea
California 29	Henry Waxman	D	Nay	Nay	Nay	Nay
Florida 15	Dave Weldon	R	Yea	Yea	Yea	Yea
Pennsylvania 7	Curt Weldon	R	Yea	Yea	Yea	Nay
Illinois 11	Jerry Weller	R	Yea	Yea	Yea	Nay
Illinois 19	Robert Wexler	D	Nay	Nay	Nay	Nay
Rhode Island 2	Robert Weygand	D	Nay	Nay	Nay	Nay
Washington 1	Rick White	R	Yea	Yea	Yea	Nay
Kentucky 1	Ed Whitfield	R	Yea	Yea	Yea	Nay
Mississippi 1	Roger Wicker	R	Yea	Yea	Yea	Yea
New Mexico 1	Heather Wilson	R	Yea	Yea	Yea	Yea
West Virginia 2	Bob Wise	D	Nay	Nay	Nay	Nay
Virginia 10	Frank Wolf	R	Yea	Yea	Yea	Yea
California 6	Lynn Woolsey	D	Nay	Nay	Nay	Nay
Maryland 4	Albert Wynn	D	Nay	Nay	Nay	Nay
Illinois 9	Sidney R. Yates	D	Nay	Nay	Nay	Nay
Alaska at-large	Don Young	R	Yea	Yea	Yea	Yea
Florida 10	Bill Young	R	Yea	Yea	Yea	Yea

== Articles referred to Senate ==
Article I, charging Clinton with perjury, alleged in part that:

On August 17, 1998, William Jefferson Clinton swore to tell the truth, the whole truth, and nothing but the truth before a federal grand jury of the United States. Contrary to that oath, William Jefferson Clinton willfully provided perjurious, false and misleading testimony to the grand jury concerning one or more of the following:

1. the nature and details of his relationship with a subordinate government employee;
2. prior perjurious, false and misleading testimony he gave in a federal civil rights action brought against him;
3. prior false and misleading statements he allowed his attorney to make to a federal judge in that civil rights action; and
4. his corrupt efforts to influence the testimony of witnesses and to impede the discovery of evidence in that civil rights action.

Article II, charging Clinton with obstruction of justice alleged in part that:

The means used to implement this course of conduct or scheme included one or more of the following acts:

1. ... corruptly encouraged a witness in a Federal civil rights action brought against him to execute a sworn affidavit in that proceeding that he knew to be perjurious, false and misleading.
2. ... corruptly encouraged a witness in a Federal civil rights action brought against him to give perjurious, false and misleading testimony if and when called to testify personally in that proceeding.
3. ... corruptly engaged in, encouraged, or supported a scheme to conceal evidence that had been subpoenaed in a Federal civil rights action brought against him.
4. ... intensified and succeeded in an effort to secure job assistance to a witness in a Federal civil rights action brought against him in order to corruptly prevent the truthful testimony of that witness in that proceeding at a time when the truthful testimony of that witness would have been harmful to him.
5. ... at his deposition in a Federal civil rights action brought against him, William Jefferson Clinton corruptly allowed his attorney to make false and misleading statements to a Federal judge characterizing an affidavit, in order to prevent questioning deemed relevant by the judge. Such false and misleading statements were subsequently acknowledged by his attorney in a communication to that judge.
6. ... related a false and misleading account of events relevant to a Federal civil rights action brought against him to a potential witness in that proceeding, in order to corruptly influence the testimony of that witness.
7. ... made false and misleading statements to potential witnesses in a Federal grand jury proceeding in order to corruptly influence the testimony of those witnesses. The false and misleading statements made by William Jefferson Clinton were repeated by the witnesses to the grand jury, causing the grand jury to receive false and misleading information.

== Senate trial ==
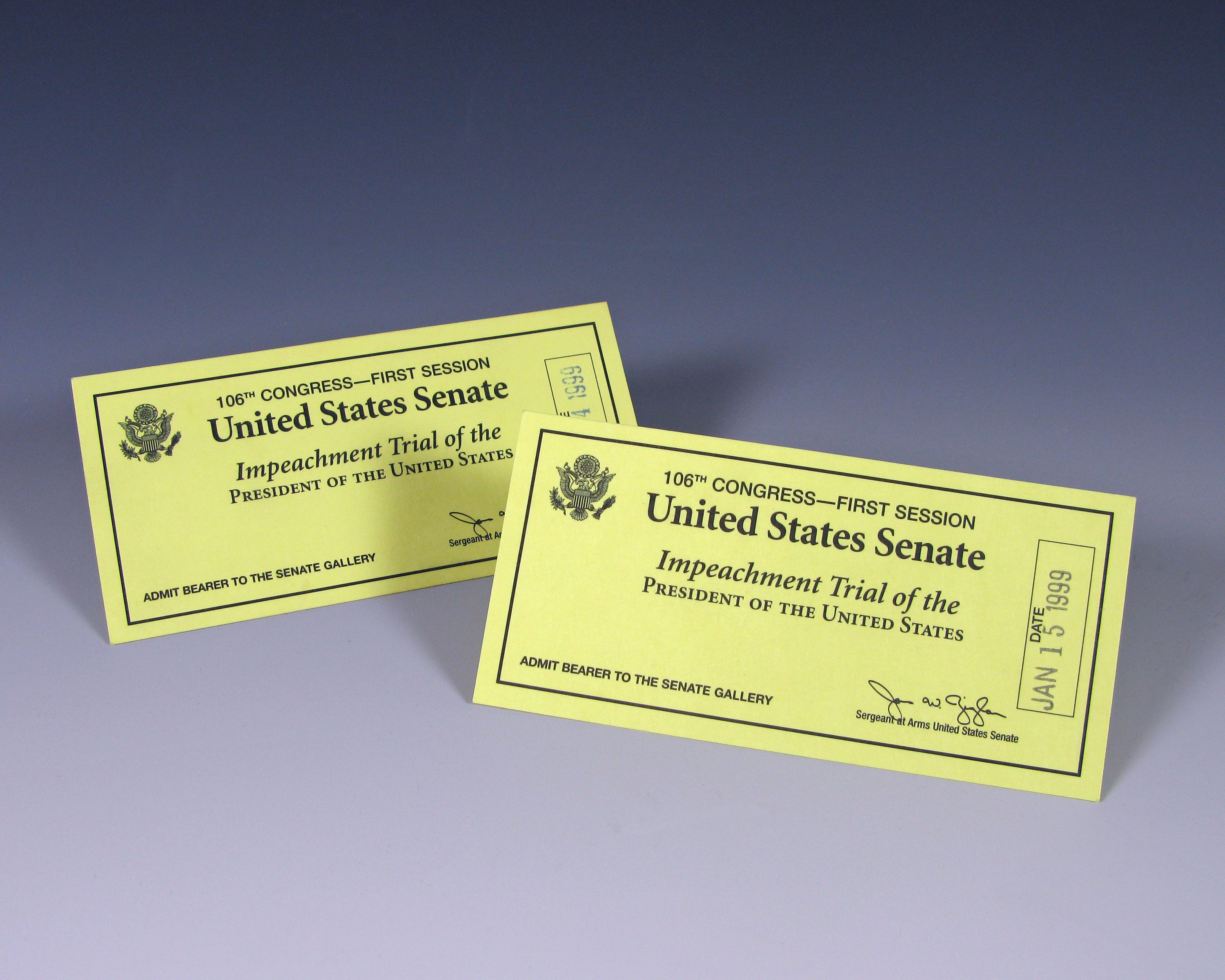
Tickets dated January 14 and 15, 1999, for President Bill Clinton's impeachment trial that were given to former President Gerald Ford

=== Preparation ===
Between December 20 and January 5, Republican and Democratic Senate leaders negotiated about the pending trial. There was some discussion about the possibility of censuring Clinton instead of holding a trial. Disagreement arose as to whether to call witnesses. This decision would ultimately not be made until after the opening arguments from the House impeachment managers and the White House defense team. On January 5, the Republican Majority Leader Trent Lott, announced that the trial would start on January 7.

=== Officers ===
Thirteen House Republicans from the Judiciary Committee served as "managers", the equivalent of prosecutors: Henry Hyde (chairman), Jim Sensenbrenner, Bill McCollum, George Gekas, Charles Canady, Steve Buyer, Ed Bryant, Steve Chabot, Bob Barr, Asa Hutchinson, Chris Cannon, James E. Rogan and Lindsey Graham.

Clinton was defended by Cheryl Mills. Clinton's counsel staff included Charles Ruff, David E. Kendall, Dale Bumpers, Bruce Lindsey, Nicole Seligman, Lanny A. Breuer and Gregory B. Craig.

=== Process and schedule ===
The Senate trial began on January 7, 1999, with Chief Justice of the United States William Rehnquist presiding. The first day consisted of formal presentation of the charges against Clinton, and of Rehnquist swearing in all senators.

A resolution on rules and procedure for the trial was adopted unanimously on the following day; however, senators tabled the question of whether to call witnesses in the trial. The trial remained in recess while briefs were filed by the House (January 11) and Clinton (January 13).

The managers presented their case over three days, from January 14 to 16, arguing for removal of the President from office by virtue of what they characterized as Clinton's "willful, premeditated, deliberate corruption of the nation's system of justice through perjury and obstruction of justice". The defense presentation took place January 19–21. Clinton's defense counsel argued that the case made against Clinton was, "an unsubstantiated, circumstantial case that does not meet the constitutional standard to remove the President from office". January 22 and 23 were devoted to questions from members of the Senate to the House managers and Clinton's defense counsel. Under the rules, all questions (over 150) were to be written down and given to Rehnquist to read to the party being questioned.

On January 25, Senator Robert Byrd moved for dismissals of both articles of impeachment. On the following day, Representative Bryant moved to call witnesses to the trial, a question the Senate had scrupulously avoided to that point. In both cases, the Senate voted to deliberate on the question in private session, rather than public, televised procedure. On January 27, the Senate voted on both motions in public session; the motion to dismiss failed on a nearly party line vote of 56–44, while the motion to depose witnesses passed by the same margin. A day later, the Senate voted down motions to move directly to a vote on the articles of impeachment and to suppress videotaped depositions of the witnesses from public release, Senator Russ Feingold again voting with the Republicans.

Over three days, February 1–3, House managers took videotaped closed-door depositions from Monica Lewinsky, Clinton's friend Vernon Jordan, and White House aide Sidney Blumenthal. On February 4, however, the Senate voted 70–30 that excerpting these videotapes would suffice as testimony, rather than calling live witnesses to appear at trial. The videos were played in the Senate on February 6, featuring 30 excerpts of Lewinsky discussing her affidavit in the Paula Jones case, the hiding of small gifts Clinton had given her, and his involvement in procurement of a job for Lewinsky.

On February 8, closing arguments were presented with each side allotted a three-hour time slot. On the President's behalf, White House Counsel Charles Ruff declared:

There is only one question before you, albeit a difficult one, one that is a question of fact and law and constitutional theory. Would it put at risk the liberties of the people to retain the President in office? Putting aside partisan animus, if you can honestly say that it would not, that those liberties are safe in his hands, then you must vote to acquit.

Chief Prosecutor Henry Hyde countered:

A failure to convict will make the statement that lying under oath, while unpleasant and to be avoided, is not all that serious ... We have reduced lying under oath to a breach of etiquette, but only if you are the President ... And now let us all take our place in history on the side of honor, and, oh, yes, let right be done.

=== Acquittal ===
On February 9, 1999, after voting against a public deliberation on the verdict, the Senate began closed-door deliberations instead. On February 12, 1999, the Senate emerged from its closed deliberations and voted on the articles of impeachment. A two-thirds vote, equal to 67 votes if all Senators voted, would have been necessary to convict on either charge and remove the President from office. The perjury charge was defeated with 45 votes for conviction and 55 against, and the obstruction of justice charge was defeated with 50 for conviction and 50 against. Senator Arlen Specter voted "not proved" (Note: A verdict used in Scots law. It was recorded as a "not guilty" vote.) for both charges, which was considered by Chief Justice Rehnquist to constitute a vote of "not guilty". All 45 Democrats in the Senate voted "not guilty" on both charges, as did five Republicans; they were joined by five additional Republicans in voting "not guilty" on the perjury charge.

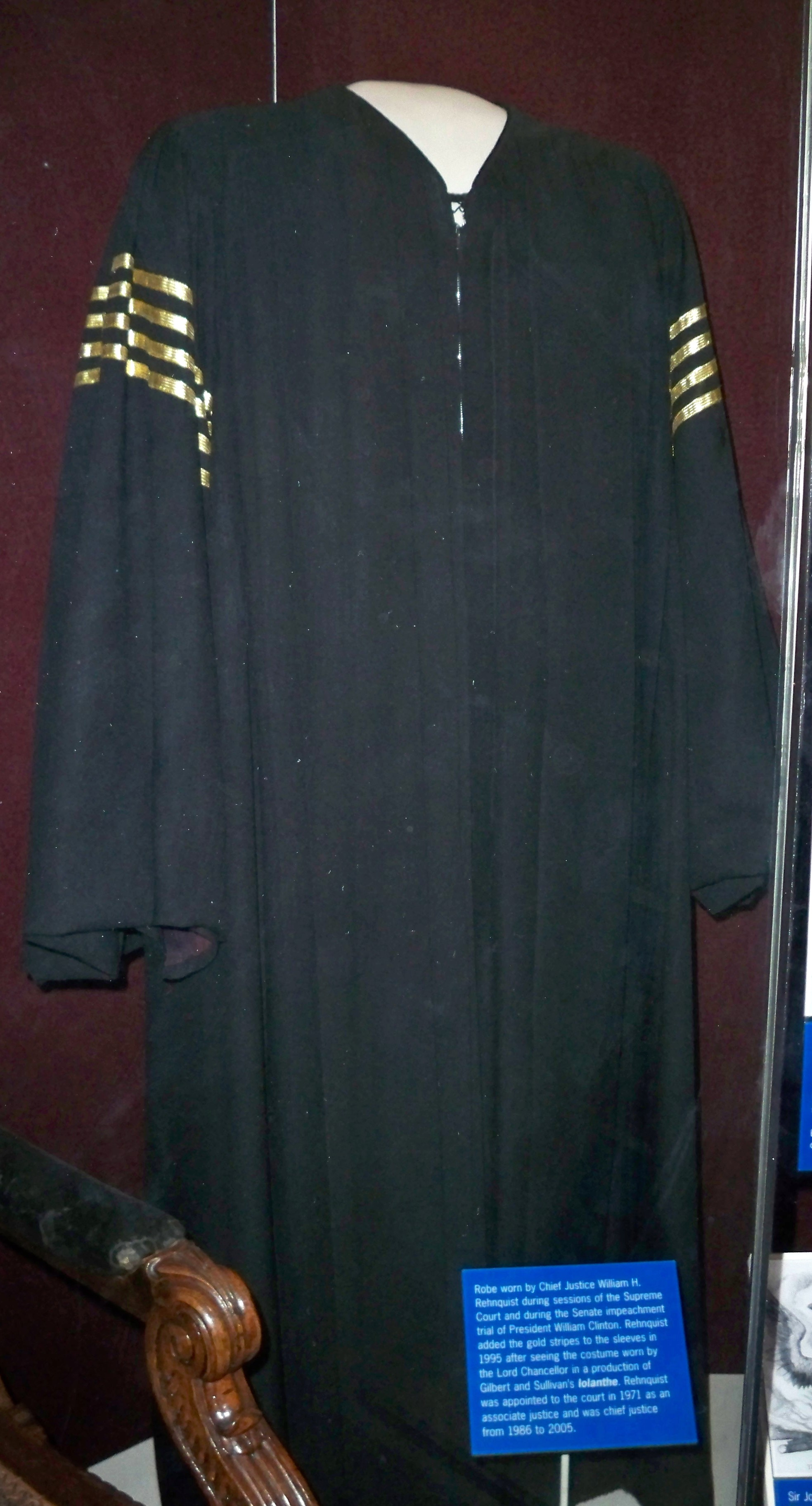
Robe worn by Chief Justice William Rehnquist during the impeachment trial

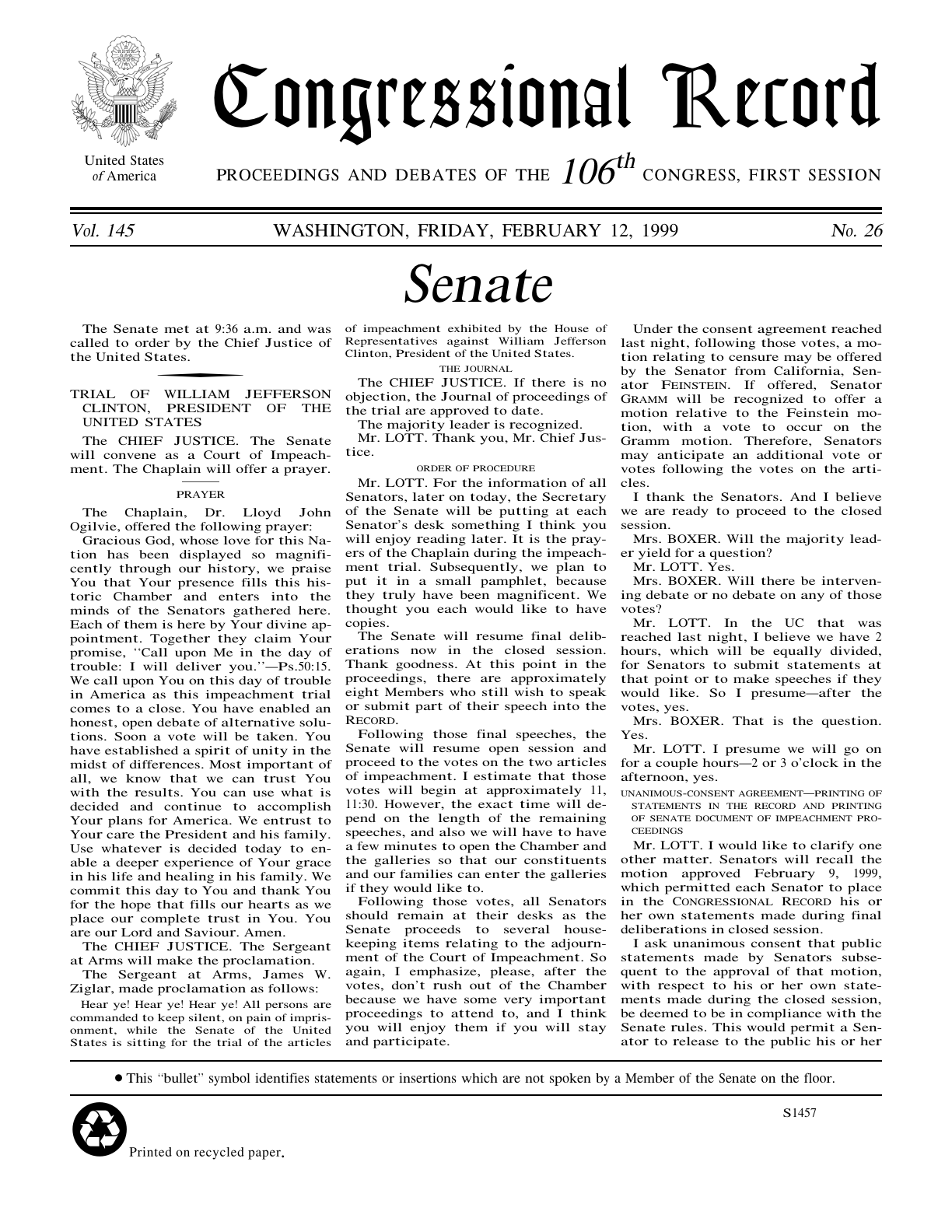
Congressional Record page, February 12, 1999, opening of the final day of the impeachment trial

Articles of Impeachment, U.S. Senate judgement (67 "guilty" votes necessary for a conviction)
Article One (perjury / grand jury)	Party		Total votes
Article One (perjury / grand jury)	Democratic	Republican	Total votes
Guilty	0	45	45
Not guilty	45	10	55
Article Two (obstruction of justice)	Party		Total votes
Article Two (obstruction of justice)	Democratic	Republican	Total votes
Guilty	0	50	50
Not guilty	45	5	50

== Subsequent events ==
=== Contempt of court citation ===
In April 1999, about two months after being acquitted by the Senate, Clinton was cited by federal District Judge Susan Webber Wright for civil contempt of court for his "willful failure" to obey her orders to testify truthfully in the Paula Jones sexual harassment lawsuit. For this, Clinton was assessed a $90,000 fine and the matter was referred to the Arkansas Supreme Court to see if disciplinary action would be appropriate.

Regarding Clinton's January 17, 1998, deposition where he was placed under oath, Webber Wright wrote:

Simply put, the president's deposition testimony regarding whether he had ever been alone with Ms. (Monica) Lewinsky was intentionally false, and his statements regarding whether he had ever engaged in sexual relations with Ms. Lewinsky likewise were intentionally false.

On the day before leaving office on January 20, 2001, Clinton, in what amounted to a plea bargain, agreed to a five-year suspension of his Arkansas law license and to pay a $25,000 fine as part of an agreement with independent counsel Robert Ray to end the investigation without the filing of any criminal charges for perjury or obstruction of justice. On October 1, 2001, Clinton was accordingly suspended from the practice of law in the United States Supreme Court who also issued an order to show cause in 40 days "why he should not be disbarred from the practice of law in this Court." Clinton resigned from the Supreme Court bar during the show-cause period, and the Supreme Court accordingly ordered his name "stricken from the roll of attorneys admitted to the practice of law before this Court."

=== Civil settlement with Paula Jones ===
Eventually, the court dismissed the Paula Jones harassment lawsuit, before trial, on the grounds that Jones failed to demonstrate any damages. However, while the dismissal was on appeal, Clinton entered into an out-of-court settlement by agreeing to pay Jones $850,000.

McCullam and Bryant later lost bids for the Senate while Rogan lost his seat to future lead impeachment manager Adam Schiff who led then President Donald Trump's impeachment in 2020. Graham successfully ran for the Senate in 2002, where he served until he passed away in July 2026.

=== Political ramifications ===
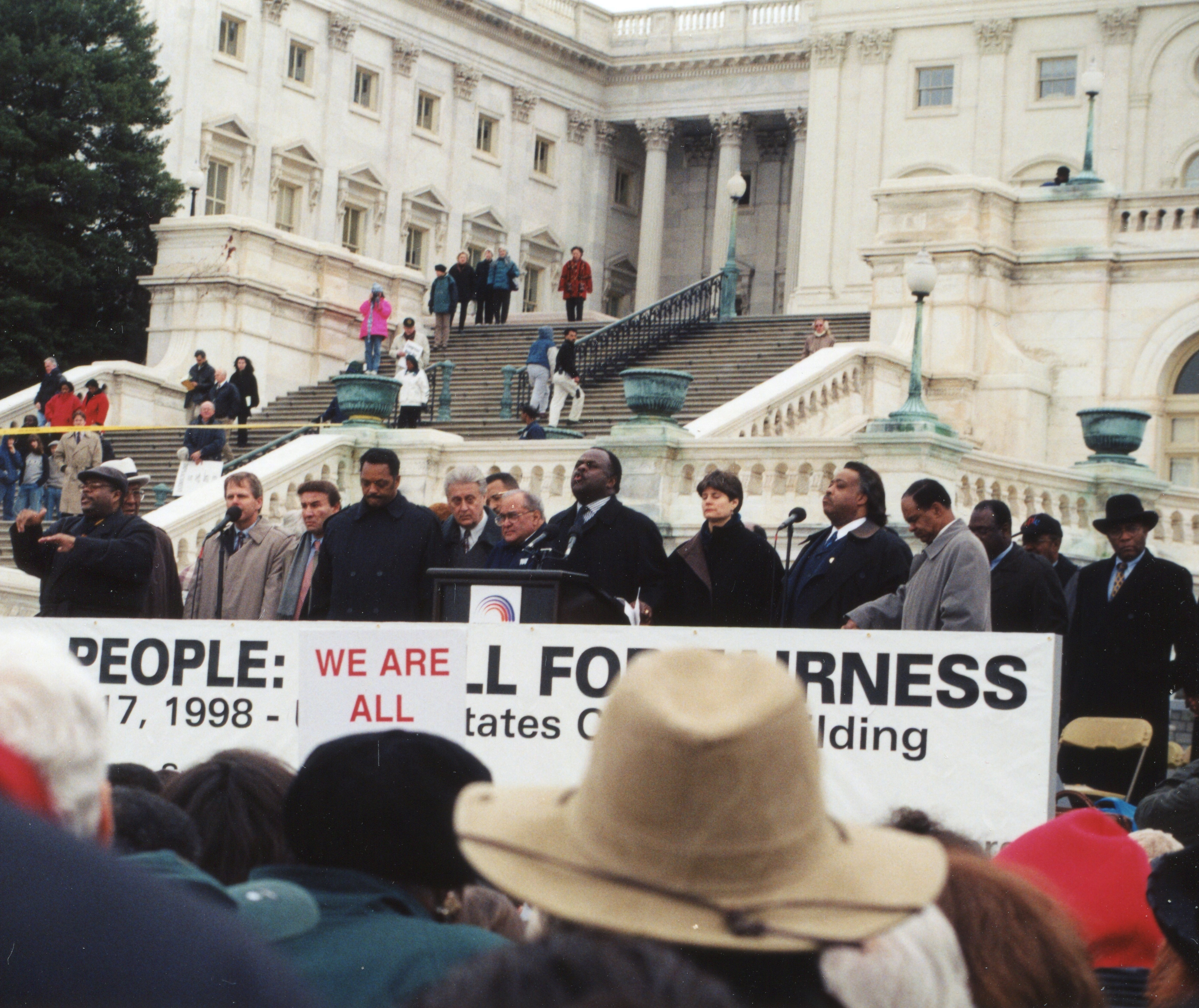
Opponents of Clinton's impeachment demonstrating outside the Capitol in December 1998

Polls conducted during 1998 and early 1999 showed that only about one-third of Americans supported Clinton's impeachment or conviction. However, one year later, when it was clear that impeachment would not lead to the ousting of the President, half of Americans said in a CNN/USA Today/Gallup poll that they supported impeachment, 57% approved of the Senate's decision to keep him in office, and two-thirds of those polled said the impeachment was harmful to the country.

While Clinton's job approval rating rose during the Clinton–Lewinsky scandal and subsequent impeachment, his poll numbers with regard to questions of honesty, integrity and moral character declined. As a result, "moral character" and "honesty" weighed heavily in the next presidential election. According to The Daily Princetonian, after the 2000 presidential election, "post-election polls found that, in the wake of Clinton-era scandals, the single most significant reason people voted for Bush was for his moral character." According to an analysis of the election by Stanford University:

A more political explanation is the belief in Gore campaign circles that disapproval of President Clinton's personal behavior was a serious threat to the vice president's prospects. Going into the election the one negative element in the public's perception of the state of the nation was the belief that the country was morally on the wrong track, whatever the state of the economy or world affairs. According to some insiders, anything done to raise the association between Gore and Clinton would have produced a net loss of support—the impact of Clinton's personal negatives would outweigh the positive impact of his job performance on support for Gore. Thus, hypothesis four suggests that a previously unexamined variable played a major role in 2000—the retiring president's personal approval.

The Stanford analysis, however, presented different theories and mainly argued that Gore had lost because he decided to distance himself from Clinton during the campaign. The writers of it concluded:

We find that Gore's oft-criticized personality was not a cause of his under-performance. Rather, the major cause was his failure to receive a historically normal amount of credit for the performance of the Clinton administration ... [and] failure to get normal credit reflected Gore's peculiar campaign which in turn reflected fear of association with Clinton's behavior.

According to the America's Future Foundation:

In the wake of the Clinton scandals, independents warmed to Bush's promise to 'restore honor and dignity to the White House'. According to Voter News Service, the personal quality that mattered most to voters was 'honesty'. Voters who chose 'honesty' preferred Bush over Gore by over a margin of five to one. Forty four percent of Americans said the Clinton scandals were important to their vote. Of these, Bush reeled in three out of every four.

Political commentators have argued that Gore's refusal to have Clinton campaign with him was a bigger liability to Gore than Clinton's scandals. The 2000 U.S. Congressional election also saw the Democrats gain more seats in Congress. As a result of this gain, control of the Senate was split 50–50 between both parties, and Democrats would gain control over the Senate after Republican Senator Jim Jeffords defected from his party in early 2001 and agreed to caucus with the Democrats.

Al Gore reportedly confronted Clinton after the election, and "tried to explain that keeping Clinton under wraps [during the campaign] was a rational response to polls showing swing voters were still mad as hell over the Year of Monica". According to the AP, "during the one-on-one meeting at the White House, which lasted more than an hour, Gore used uncommonly blunt language to tell Clinton that his sex scandal and low personal approval ratings were a hurdle he could not surmount in his campaign ... [with] the core of the dispute was Clinton's lies to Gore and the nation about his affair with White House intern Monica Lewinsky." Clinton, however, was unconvinced by Gore's argument and insisted to Gore that he would have won the election if he had embraced the administration and its good economic record.

=== Partial retraction from Starr ===
In January 2020, while testifying as a defense lawyer for U.S. President Donald Trump during his first Senate impeachment trial, Starr himself would retract some of the allegations he made to justify Clinton's impeachment. Slate journalist Jeremy Stahl pointed out that as he was urging the Senate not to remove Trump as president, Starr contradicted various arguments he used in 1998 to justify Clinton's impeachment. In defending Trump, Starr also claimed he was wrong to have called for impeachment against Clinton for abuse of executive privilege and efforts to obstruct Congress, and stated that the House Judiciary Committee was right in 1998 to have rejected one of the planks for impeachment he had advocated for. He also invoked a 1999 Hofstra Law Review article by Yale law professor Akhil Amar, who argued that the Clinton impeachment proved just how impeachment and removal causes "grave disruption" to a national election.

== See also ==
- Impeachment of Andrew Johnson
- Impeachment process against Richard Nixon
- First impeachment of Donald Trump
- Second impeachment of Donald Trump
- Impeachment: American Crime Story
- List of federal political scandals in the United States
- List of federal political sex scandals in the United States
- Second-term curse
- Bill Clinton sexual assault and misconduct allegations
