= Beth Nolan =

American lawyer

White House Counsel
- In office September 1999 – January 20, 2001
- President: Bill Clinton
- Preceded by: Cheryl Mills (Acting)
- Succeeded by: Alberto Gonzales

Personal details
- Born: August 21, 1951 (age 75) New York City, U.S.
- Party: Democratic
- Education: Scripps College (BA); Georgetown University (JD)

Beth Nolan (born August 21, 1951, in New York City) was vice president and general counsel of the George Washington University. She was also Bill Clinton's final White House Counsel, as well as the first woman to hold the office. Prior to serving as White House Counsel, Nolan worked in other White House and Department of Justice positions, taught law, and worked in private practice.

== Personal ==
Nolan was born in New York City, and received her Bachelor of Arts degree at Scripps College in 1973. Nolan earned her Juris Doctor from Georgetown University Law Center, graduating magna cum laude in 1980. While studying at Georgetown, she was Editor-in-Chief of the Georgetown Law Journal. She was admitted to the District of Columbia Bar in 1981.

== Career ==
Nolan began her career in 1980, where she clerked for Collins J. Seitz, a judge on the Third Circuit Court of Appeals, until 1981.

From 1981 to 1985, Nolan served as a staff attorney under then Assistant Attorney General of the United States, Theodore Olsen.

From 1985 to 1993, Nolan taught at George Washington University Law School, earning tenure in 1992. At George Washington, she taught constitutional law, government ethics, and professional responsibility.

Nolan was also a professor at George Washington University Law School during the 1995–1996 school year.

Nolan began working in the White house as Associate White House Counsel, serving from 1993 to 1995. From 1996 to 1999, she served as Deputy Assistant Attorney General in the Office of Legal Counsel.

In 1997, Nolan became the nominee to serve as Assistant Attorney General of the United States for Office of Legal Counsel, although the Senate never voted on the nomination.

From 1999 to 2001, Nolan served as White House Counsel, serving until Bill Clinton left office in January 2001.

After leaving the White House, Nolan became a fellow at Harvard Kennedy School's Institute of Politics.

In 2002, Nolan became a partner at Crowell & Moring. Nolan left the firm in 2007.

From 2007 until 2021, Nolan was vice president and General Counsel of George Washington University.

== Other ==
She testified on March 5, 2001, before the House Government Reform Committee that Bill Clinton's pardon of Marc Rich did not advance President Clinton's financial interests, but that she had personally opposed it.

President Clinton nominated her in 1997 to be Assistant Attorney General of the United States for the Office of Legal Counsel, but the United States Senate did not confirm her. Along with Webster Hubbell and Vince Foster, she had helped Ira Magaziner prepare an affidavit explaining why he was not required to reveal who had participated in the formulation of the failed 1993 Clinton health care plan. United States District Court judge Royce Lamberth called the affidavit a lie, although an appellate court held Magaziner had acted in good faith - after her nomination had failed.

Her appointment on August 10, 1999, as White House Counsel did not require Senate confirmation, and she began in September.

During its investigations of the 1996 United States campaign finance controversy, Monica Lewinsky scandal, White House FBI files controversy, and White House travel office controversy the United States House Committee on Oversight and Government Reform subpoenaed White House email traffic.

In March 2000, White House contractors testified that the email previously produced in response to these subpoenas had omitted probably thousands of responsive emails. Technical employees had discovered in June 1998 that the automated records management system had incorrectly scanned and logged the emails, possibly since 1994. The testified further that White House staff had cautioned them against disclosing this problem to anyone, on pain of dismissal or even prosecution. White House Counsel Nolan testified (March 2000) before the committee and a skeptical chairman Dan Burton that it would take Northrop Grumman contract personal 6 months to restore the data. She also said that to the best of her knowledge she knew of no evidence that anyone in the White House had attempted to conceal this noncompliance, nor that she or her office had been told of allegations of threats.

After working in the White House, Nolan became a partner with the law firm Crowell & Moring in the firm's white collar and securities litigation group. She had a broad-based federal and international practice focuses on strategic counseling, congressional investigations, internal investigations and compliance, government and legal ethics, federal election law, constitutional and public policy issues, international claims, and other matters.

In February 2006, she published a letter to members of the United States Congress, signed jointly with several legal scholars former government officials arguing that an NSA electronic surveillance program was unlawful.

Nolan argued in March 2007 that the Bush administration's assertions of executive privilege were excessive in the matter of the Dismissal of U.S. attorneys controversy, both in an op-ed article for The Washington Post and before Linda Sánchez and the House Judiciary Committee's Subcommittee on Commercial and Administrative Law during their Hearing on "Ensuring Executive Branch Accountability". She said the administration might lose such a claim. At George Washington University law school she had taught constitutional law.

In 2007, she represented, along with a great many others, Blackwater Worldwide a private military company. Following the Blackwater Baghdad shootings, Henry Waxman's House Oversight Committee subpoenaed its chief executive officer Erik Prince to testify. The climate of opinion among politicians and the public at large jeopardized its contracts to provide security for State Department personnel in Iraq.

During the 2008 presidential election, she contributed the maximum allowed to the Hillary Clinton campaign. She has also been a contributor to Wesley Clark, Emily's List and John Kerry.

== Memberships and recognition ==
- Board of Directors of the Lawyers' Committee for Civil Rights Under Law
- Board of Directors of the Arthritis Foundation of the National Capital Area
- Board of Advisors of the Harvard Law & Policy Review
- National Commission on Judicial Discipline and Removal (1993)

== Writings ==
- Nolan, Beth. Removing Conflicts from the Administration of Justice: Conflicts of Interest and Independent Counsels under the Ethics in Government Act, 79 GEO. L.J. 1 (1990). K7 .E645
- Nolan, Beth. The Role of Judicial Ethics in the Discipline and Removal of Federal Judges.
- Nolan, Beth (1999-02-11). "Attorney's Fees for Legal Service Performed Prior to Federal Employment". United States Department of Justice Office of Legal Counsel. Archived from the original on 2008-10-15. "18 U.S.C. § 205 prohibits a Civil Division attorney from receiving attorney's fees for work in a case against the United States performed prior to federal employment when the right to payment depends on a finding of liability and award against the United States that takes place after the attorney's entry into federal employment."

== Notes ==
Legal offices
| Preceded by Cheryl Mills; Acting | White House Counsel; 1999–2001 | Succeeded by Alberto Gonzales |
