= Charles Ruff =

American lawyer (1939–2000)

Chuck Ruff
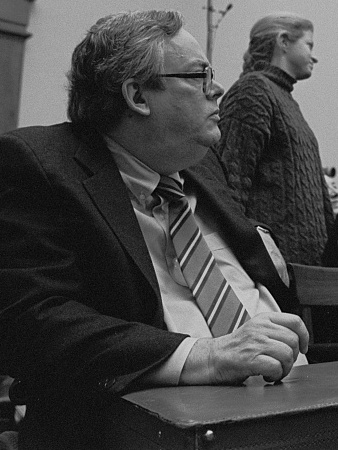

White House Counsel
- In office February 1997 – August 6, 1999
- President: Bill Clinton
- Preceded by: Jack Quinn
- Succeeded by: Cheryl Mills (acting)

Corporation Counsel of the District of Columbia
- In office August 1995 – February 1997
- Mayor: Marion Barry
- Preceded by: Garland Pinkston (acting)
- Succeeded by: Jo Anne Robinson (acting)

United States Attorney for the District of Columbia
- In office 1979–1981
- President: Jimmy Carter
- Preceded by: Earl Silbert
- Succeeded by: Stanley S. Harris

United States Deputy Attorney General
- Acting
- In office August 16, 1979 – February 27, 1980
- President: Jimmy Carter
- Preceded by: Benjamin Civiletti
- Succeeded by: Charles Renfrew

Special Prosecutor for the United States Department of Justice
- In office October 17, 1975 – June 1977
- Appointed by: Edward H. Levi
- Preceded by: Henry S. Ruth Jr.
- Succeeded by: Position abolished

Personal details
- Born: Charles Frederick Carson Ruff; August 1, 1939 Cleveland, Ohio, U.S.
- Died: November 19, 2000 (aged 61) Washington, D.C., U.S.
- Party: Democratic
- Education: Swarthmore College (BA); Columbia University (JD)

Charles Frederick Carson Ruff (August 1, 1939 – November 19, 2000) was a prominent American lawyer based in Washington, D.C., and was best known as the White House Counsel who defended President Bill Clinton during his impeachment trial in 1999.

== Early life and education ==
Charles Frederick Carson Ruff was born on August 1, 1939, in Cleveland Ohio; he grew up mostly in New York City. Ruff's mother was the public relations director of the Metropolitan Opera, and in an oral history recorded shortly before his death Ruff remembered frequently attending the opera as a child, giving him a lifelong love of music.

Ruff received his B.A. degree from Swarthmore College in 1960 and his J.D. degree from Columbia Law School in 1963. Although Ruff ranked twelfth in a class of 235 at Columbia, he later stated that he "absolutely detested law school."

After graduating from law school, Ruff accepted a Ford Foundation fellowship to teach law in Africa. In 1964, while in Liberia, Ruff was sickened with flulike symptoms (a specific diagnosis was never made) and almost died; he became paralyzed in the legs and used a wheelchair for the rest of his life. Ruff preferred not to discuss his disability, saying only that "law is a sedentary profession."

== Career ==
Ruff was a research associate at Columbia University's African Law Center and taught at the University of Pennsylvania. He joined the U.S. Department of Justice as a trial lawyer in 1967.

Ruff briefly returned to teaching, spending the 1972–73 academic year at the newly established Antioch School of Law. Ruff then accepted a job at the Georgetown University Law Center and simultaneously at the Justice Department's Watergate Special Prosecution Force, which investigated the Watergate scandal. Ruff served in the office from 1973 to 1977. Initially an assistant special prosecutor, Ruff became the fourth and last Watergate special prosecutor, serving from 1976 to 1978; he oversaw the winding-down of the office. As special prosecutor, Ruff also oversaw a three-month campaign-finance investigation of President Gerald R. Ford, who was cleared. During the Watergate years, he also taught at Georgetown University Law Center.

Ruff was chief of the Organized Crime and Labor Management Section of the Criminal Division from 1970 to 1972; in that position, Ruff oversaw the successful prosecution of W.A. "Tony" Boyle, the former head of the United Mine Workers, for illegal campaign contributions.

In 1978, Ruff became deputy inspector general of the Department of Health, Education and Welfare, investigating Medicare and Medicaid fraud. His nomination was stalled in the Senate for several months by Robert Dole of Kansas. In 1979, Ruff re-joined the Justice Department as acting deputy attorney general; in this role, Ruff was involved in the prosecution of members of Congress implicated in the Abscam scandal.

In 1979, President Jimmy Carter appointed Ruff as United States Attorney for the District of Columbia; he held that job until 1981. Ruff was considered exceptionally qualified for the post, although some African American leaders expressed disappointment that a black lawyer had not been chosen. As U.S. Attorney, Ruff played a "minor legal role" in the case of John W. Hinckley Jr.'s attempted assassination of Ronald Reagan and the assassination of Orlando Letelier.

In 1982, Ruff joined the Washington law firm of Covington & Burling, becoming a partner there. Ruff represented Senator John Glenn in the Keating Five scandal (Glenn was admonished by the Senate Ethics Committee) and defended Senator Charles S. Robb against charges of surreptitiously and unlawfully recording, and disseminating, some private conversations of a political rival, Governor L. Douglas Wilder. In the Robb case, Ruff "persuaded Robb to appear for a second time before the grand jury and then introduced a Justice Department official to instruct the jury that it was not legally bound to follow prosecutors' recommendations for an indictment."

From 1989 and 1990, Ruff served a term as president of the District of Columbia Bar.

In 1991, Ruff was part of the legal team representing Anita Hill during the Clarence Thomas Supreme Court nomination; Ruff arranged for Hill to take a polygraph test.

Ruff was considered by the Clinton administration in 1993 for the post of deputy attorney general, but he was passed over for the position.

Ruff left Covington & Burling in August 1995 to accept an appointment by Mayor Marion Barry to the post of Corporation Counsel for the District of Columbia, overseeing 200 city lawyers. Ruff was credited with restoring the reputation of the office, which had faced criticism after having been beset with a series of problems. Ruff's decision to leave private practice to lead the Corporation Counsel's Office meant an 80% pay cut; Ruff's colleague Lanny A. Breuer stated that Ruff had taken the position because it was the right thing to do.

In February 1997, Ruff left the Corporation Counsel's Office to become White House Counsel to President Clinton, the president's fifth. In this role, became best known for defending Clinton during his 1999 impeachment trial in the Senate, which ended in the president's acquittal. Ruff was one of five defense attorneys who represented Clinton; the others were Gregory B. Craig, Cheryl D. Mills, David E. Kendall. and Dale Bumpers. According to his Washington Post obituary, "within the White House, Mr. Ruff was not seen as an obvious team player. He refrained from freely dispensing information to those who did not absolutely need to know the president's legal strategy." Ruff particularly clashed with Craig, who had been brought on by the White House specifically as the "quarterback" for the impeachment defense strategy; "each man behaved as if he were the one in charge" and the two had different professional styles.

In the summer of 1999, Ruff rejoined Covington & Burling, where he remained for the rest of his life; at the time of his death, Ruff was a senior partner.

== Death ==
Ruff died on November 19, 2000, at the District of Columbia General Hospital, at the age of 61, following a heart attack in his home. At the time of his death, Ruff was part of Vice President Al Gore's legal team in the Florida recount case. Ruff was survived by his wife of 38 years, Susan (Sue) Willis Ruff, as well as his mother, two daughters, two granddaughters, and a half-sister, Carla Ruff.

On his death, his New York Times obituary described him as "one of Washington's most influential if least self-important lawyers."

== Honors ==
On January 8, 2001, Ruff was posthumously awarded the Presidential Citizens Medal by President Clinton.

Legal offices
Preceded by Earl Silbert	United States Attorney for the District of Columbia; 1979–1981	Succeeded by Stanley S. Harris
Preceded by Benjamin Civiletti	United States Deputy Attorney General; Acting; 1979–1980	Succeeded by Charles Renfrew
Preceded by Garland Pinkston; Acting	Corporation Counsel of the District of Columbia; 1995–1997	Succeeded by Jo Anne Robinson; Acting
Preceded by Jack Quinn	White House Counsel; 1997–1999	Succeeded by Cheryl Mills; Acting
