= Sae-A Trading =

South Korean clothing manufacturer

The Sae-A Trading Company, Ltd., usually called Sae-A Trading or simply Sae-A /ˈseɪ ˈɑː/ (Korean: 세아), is a global clothing manufacturer in South Korea.

== About ==
Sae-A's headquarters is located in Gangnam-gu of South Korea, and the factories producing its products are in Costa Rica, Guatemala, Nicaragua, Indonesia, Vietnam, Cambodia, and Haiti. According to its data, sales result for year 2015 increased from $740 million in 2007 to $1.6 billion. Which are from mass market retailers and specialty clothing brands in the United States and some in Europe and Asia. The company is known for its Product Development and Design (PDD) department which consists mainly with Fabric R&D, Wash Innovation and Design functions. The chairman of this company is Woong-Ki Kim.

== History ==
Sae-A was founded in 1986.

== S&H Global ==
Frédéric Thomas, writing in Le Monde Diplomatique, claims that the number two employer in the garment industry in Haiti currently employs 8,000 people. He further describes the hierarchy in late 2016 as being composed of Korean upper management, Central American or Dominican Republic middle management, and Haitians providing the unskilled labor. In May 2016, President Jocelerme Privert expressed concern over violence directed at S&H Global executives.

== Timeline ==
- 2015 SAE-A Spinning Mill in Costa Rica
- 2014 Opening S&H School in Haiti
