= The Urban Lawyer =

- Discipline: State and local government law
- Language: English
- Edited by: Julie M. Cheslik, Leo O. Salinger

Publication details
- History: 1969–present
- Frequency: Quarterly

Standard abbreviations
- Bluebook: Urb. Law.
- ISO 4: Urban Lawyer

Indexing
- ISSN: 0042-0905 (print); 1942-6593 (web)
- LCCN: 70030933
- JSTOR: 00420905
- OCLC no.: 1768868

Links
- Journal homepage

The Urban Lawyer is a quarterly peer-reviewed law journal and the official publication of the American Bar Association's (ABA) Section of State and Local Government Law. Published in cooperation with the University of Missouri–Kansas City School of Law, The Urban Lawyer has the largest circulation of any government law journal in the world.

== Overview ==
The Urban Lawyer publishes articles, essays, letters, case studies, and book reviews relating to urban legal issues. Frequent topics include land use law, government operations, environmental law, public education, public finance, public transportation, ethics, and international law. The journal also hosts symposia on topics relating to urban law and policy. Recent symposia topics have included "Education Reform and Governance," "A 2020 View of Urban Infrastructure," and a "Symposium on Fair Housing Testing."

Each year, at least one issue of the journal includes an "Annual Review of the Law," which discusses recent developments in litigation involving urban legal issues. Recent reviews have included, among other subjects, a summary of developments in urban planning law and a summary of developments in education law. The journal also publishes committee reports written by the American Bar Association Section of State and Local Government Law. Additionally, the journal publishes "case notes" that summarize recent significant court decisions pertaining to urban law as well as book reviews of recently published books about urban legal issues.

== History ==
In 1968, the American Bar Association's Section of State and Local Government Law decided to replace the Local Government Law Section Newsletter with a full-scale, peer-reviewed law journal to serve as a scholarly forum for "urban legal problem solving." The first volume of the journal was published in 1969, in the wake of what the editors described as "the urban crisis." The founding editors planned for the journal to address "substantive problems common to all local governments such as condemnation, local finance and revenues, special assessments and taxing, planning and zoning." The Section of State and Local Government Law decided to name the journal "The Urban Lawyer" to reflect the fact that "the rapidly increasing shift of our population to urban centers indicates that local governments of the present and future are and will be essentially urban governments."

== Impact ==
With nearly 6,000 hard-copy subscribers and nearly 3,000 online subscribers, the journal is "the largest circulating government law journal in the world." Articles in it have been cited by the Supreme Court of the United States, as well as the Second, Third, Fourth, Sixth, Seventh, Ninth, Tenth, and the Federal Circuit Courts of Appeals. The journal has also been cited by many state supreme courts. Articles appear in many legal treatises, including American Jurisprudence, American Law Institute, and Westlaw practice guides.

Washington and Lee University's Law Journal Rankings place The Urban Lawyer among the top ten peer-edited law journals most cited by other journals. Washington and Lee University's rankings also place the journal among the top fifteen peer-edited law journals by combined score. The journal is also the second-highest rated peer-edited law journal that publishes articles relating to public policy, politics, and the law. In 2014, the journal was called a "hidden gem" of the JSTOR archive.

== Abstracting and indexing ==
The Urban Lawyer is abstracted or indexed in Academic Search (EbscoHost), HeinOnline, LexisNexis, Westlaw, and the University of Washington's Current Index to Legal Periodicals. Tables of contents are also available through Infotrieve and Ingenta. The American Bar Association also publishes recent articles from the journal on the Section of State and Local Government Law's website.

== At the Cutting Edge: Land Use Law from The Urban Lawyer ==
The American Bar Association's Section of State and Local Government Law also publishes a compendium of section committee reports in book form, titled At the Cutting Edge: Land Use Law from The Urban Lawyer. This compendium reprints reports on the subject of land use law that were originally published in The Urban Lawyer. The idea for a compendium originated from a 2008 meeting of leaders of the Section of State and Local Government Law, where leaders discussed ways in which scholarship published in The Urban Lawyer could reach a wider audience. To accomplish this goal, section leaders decided to publish a collection of committee reports in book form, and the first edition of At the Cutting Edge was released in 2009. The American Bar Association publishes an updated collection of reports on an annual basis.

== Most cited articles ==
According to Westlaw Legal Research Services, the following three articles have been cited most often:

1. Daniel R. Mandelker & A. Dan Tarlock, Shifting the Presumption of Constitutionality in Land-Use Law, 24 Urb. Law. 1 (1992)
2. Daniel R. Mandelker, Investment Backed Expectations in Taking Law, 27 Urb. Law. 215 (1995)
3. John J. Delaney & Duane J. Desiderio, Who Will Clean Up the "Ripeness Mess"? A Call for Reform So Takings Plaintiffs Can Enter the Federal Courthouse, 31 Urb. Law. 195 (1999)

== See also ==
- Urbanism
- Law review
- List of law journals
