= Bill Clinton =

President of the United States from 1993 to 2001

- Official portrait, 1993

42nd President of the United States
- In office January 20, 1993 – January 20, 2001
- Vice President: Al Gore
- Preceded by: George H. W. Bush
- Succeeded by: George W. Bush

40th and 42nd Governor of Arkansas
- In office January 11, 1983 – December 12, 1992
- Lieutenant: Winston Bryant; Jim Guy Tucker
- Preceded by: Frank D. White
- Succeeded by: Jim Guy Tucker
- In office January 9, 1979 – January 19, 1981
- Lieutenant: Joe Purcell
- Preceded by: David Pryor; Joe Purcell (acting)
- Succeeded by: Frank D. White

50th Attorney General of Arkansas
- In office January 3, 1977 – January 9, 1979
- Governor: David Pryor; Joe Purcell (acting)
- Preceded by: Jim Guy Tucker
- Succeeded by: Steve Clark

Personal details
- Born: William Jefferson Blythe III; August 19, 1946 (age 80) Hope, Arkansas, U.S.
- Party: Democratic
- Spouse: Hillary Rodham (m. 1975)
- Children: Chelsea Clinton
- Parents: William Jefferson Blythe Jr.; Virginia Cassidy
- Relatives: Clinton family
- Education: Georgetown University (BS); Yale University (JD)
- Awards: Full list
- Website: Official website; Presidential library; Clinton Foundation; White House archives
- Clinton's voice Clinton on the U.S. decision to join NATO airstrikes in Yugoslavia; Recorded March 24, 1999

William Jefferson Clinton (né Blythe III; born August 19, 1946) is an American retired politician and lawyer who served as the 42nd president of the United States from 1993 to 2001. A member of the Democratic Party, he previously served as the attorney general of Arkansas from 1977 to 1979, the governor of Arkansas from 1979 to 1981, and governor again from 1983 to 1992. His centrist Third Way political philosophy became known as Clintonism, which defined his presidency and the succeeding decades of the Democratic Party into the 21st century.

Born and raised in Arkansas, Clinton graduated from Georgetown University in 1968, and later from Yale Law School, where he met his future wife, Hillary Rodham. After graduating from law school, Clinton returned to Arkansas and won election as state attorney general, followed by two non-consecutive tenures as Arkansas governor. As governor, he overhauled the state's education system and served as chairman of the National Governors Association. Running as a "New Democrat", Clinton was elected president in the 1992 election, defeating the incumbent Republican president George H. W. Bush, and the independent businessman Ross Perot. He became the first president to be born in the Baby Boomer generation and the youngest to serve two full terms.

Clinton presided over the longest American period of peacetime economic expansion at the time. He signed into law the North American Free Trade Agreement, the Brady Handgun Violence Prevention Act and the Violent Crime Control and Law Enforcement Act. He failed, however, to pass his plan for national health care reform, and accepted a controversial compromise policy to his original plan to allow gay and lesbian service members to serve openly in the military. Starting in the mid-1990s, after Democrats were soundly defeated in the 1994 midterms, he began an ideological evolution as he became much more conservative in his domestic policy, advocating for and signing the Personal Responsibility and Work Opportunity Act and Republican-led financial deregulation measures, while still championing liberal policy such as the State Children's Health Insurance Program. He appointed Ruth Bader Ginsburg and Stephen Breyer to the U.S. Supreme Court. In foreign policy, Clinton ordered U.S. military intervention in the Bosnian and Kosovo wars, eventually signing the Dayton Peace agreement. He also called for the expansion of NATO in Eastern Europe and many former Warsaw Pact members joined NATO during his presidency. Clinton's foreign policy in the Middle East saw him sign the Iraq Liberation Act which gave aid to groups against Saddam Hussein. He also participated in the Oslo I Accord and Camp David Summit to advance the Israeli–Palestinian peace process, and assisted the Northern Ireland peace process.

Clinton won re-election in the 1996 election, defeating Republican nominee Bob Dole and returning Reform Party nominee Ross Perot. In his second term, Clinton made use of permanent normal trade. Many of his second term accomplishments were overshadowed by his highly publicised affair with White House intern Monica Lewinsky, when it was revealed in early 1998 that the two had been engaging in an eighteen-month-long sexual relationship. This scandal escalated throughout the year, culminating in December when Clinton was impeached by the House of Representatives, becoming the first U.S. president to be impeached since Andrew Johnson. The two impeachment articles that the House passed were centered around perjury and Clinton using the powers of the presidency to commit obstruction of justice. In January 1999, Clinton's impeachment trial began in the Senate, where he was acquitted two months later on both charges. During the last three years of Clinton's presidency, the Congressional Budget Office reported a budget surplus—the first and only such surplus since 1969.

Clinton left office in 2001 with the joint-highest approval rating of any U.S. president. His presidency consistently ranks among the middle to upper tier in historical rankings of U.S. presidents. His personal conduct and misconduct allegations have made him the subject of substantial scrutiny. Since leaving office, Clinton has been involved in public speaking and humanitarian work. He created the Clinton Foundation to address international causes such as the prevention of HIV/AIDS and global warming. In 2009, he was named the United Nations special envoy to Haiti. After the 2010 Haiti earthquake, Clinton founded the Clinton Bush Haiti Fund with George W. Bush. He has remained active in Democratic Party politics, campaigning for his wife's 2008 and 2016 presidential campaigns. Following Jimmy Carter's death in December 2024, he is the earliest-serving living former U.S. president and the last surviving president to have served in the 20th century.

== Early life and career ==
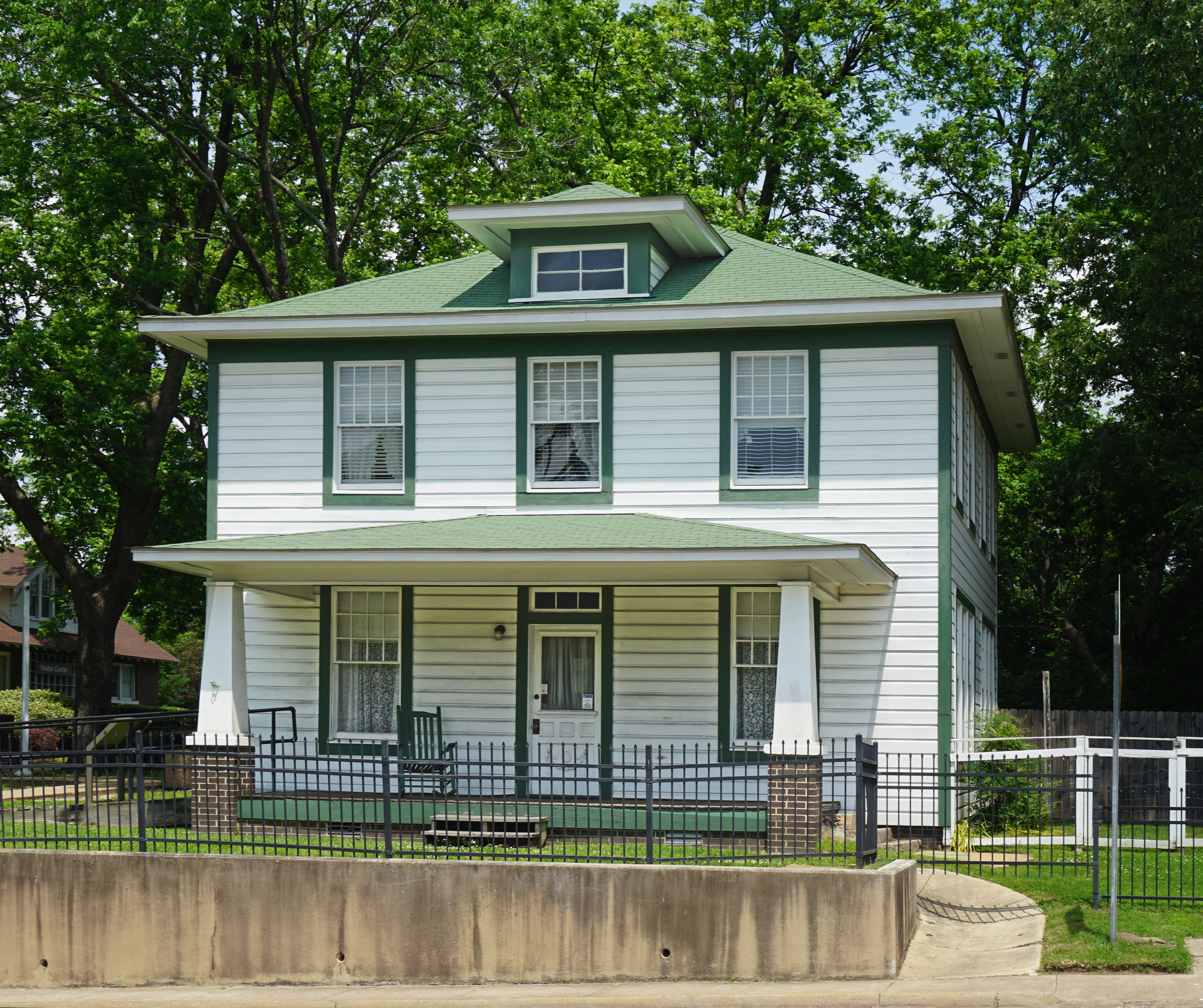
Clinton's birthplace home in Hope, Arkansas

Clinton was born as William Jefferson Blythe III on August 19, 1946, at the Julia Chester Hospital in Hope, Arkansas. He is the son of William Jefferson Blythe Jr., a traveling salesman who died in an automobile accident three months before his birth, and Virginia Dell Cassidy (later Virginia Kelley).

Clinton's parents married on September 4, 1943, but this union later proved bigamous, as Blythe was still married to his fourth wife. Virginia traveled to New Orleans to study nursing soon after Bill was born, leaving him in Hope with her parents Eldridge and Edith Cassidy, who owned and ran a small grocery store. At a time when the southern United States was racially segregated, Clinton's grandparents sold goods on credit to people of all races. (Note: Attributed to multiple sources:) In 1950, Bill's mother returned from nursing school and married Roger Clinton Sr., who co-owned an automobile dealership in Hot Springs, Arkansas, with his brother and Earl T. Ricks. The family moved to Hot Springs in 1950. Although he immediately assumed use of his stepfather's surname, it was not until Clinton turned 15 that he formally adopted the surname Clinton as a gesture toward him. Clinton has described his stepfather as a gambler and an alcoholic who regularly abused his family. The physical abuse only ceased after a then-14-year-old Bill challenged his stepfather to "stand and face" him, though the verbal abuse continued. Bill would eventually forgive Roger Sr. for his abusive actions near the latter's death.

In Hot Springs, Clinton attended St. John's Catholic Elementary School, Ramble Elementary School, and Hot Springs High School, which was segregated, where he was an active student leader, avid reader, and musician. Clinton was in the chorus and played the tenor saxophone, winning first chair in the state band's saxophone section. While in high school, Clinton performed for two years in a jazz trio, The 3 Kings, with Randy Goodrum, who became a successful professional pianist.

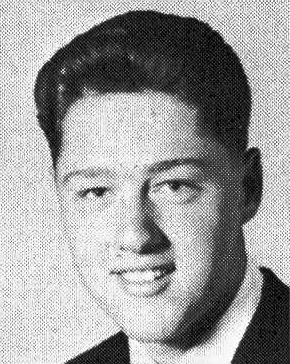
Clinton in Hot Springs High School's 1963 yearbook

In 1961, Clinton became a member of the Hot Springs Chapter of the Order of DeMolay, a youth group affiliated with Freemasonry, but he never became a Freemason. He briefly considered dedicating his life to music, but felt that his musical skills would never match the skills of the best musicians, so pursued politics instead. Clinton began an interest in law at Hot Springs High when he took up the challenge to argue the defense of the ancient Roman senator Catiline in a mock trial in his Latin class. After a vigorous defense that made use of his "budding rhetorical and political skills", he told the Latin teacher Elizabeth Buck it "made him realize that someday he would study law".

Clinton has identified two influential moments in his life, both occurring in 1963, that contributed to his decision to become a public figure. One was his visit as a Boys Nation senator to the White House to meet President John F. Kennedy. The other was watching Martin Luther King Jr.'s "I Have a Dream" speech on TV, which impressed him so much that he later memorized it.

== College and law school years ==
=== Georgetown University ===
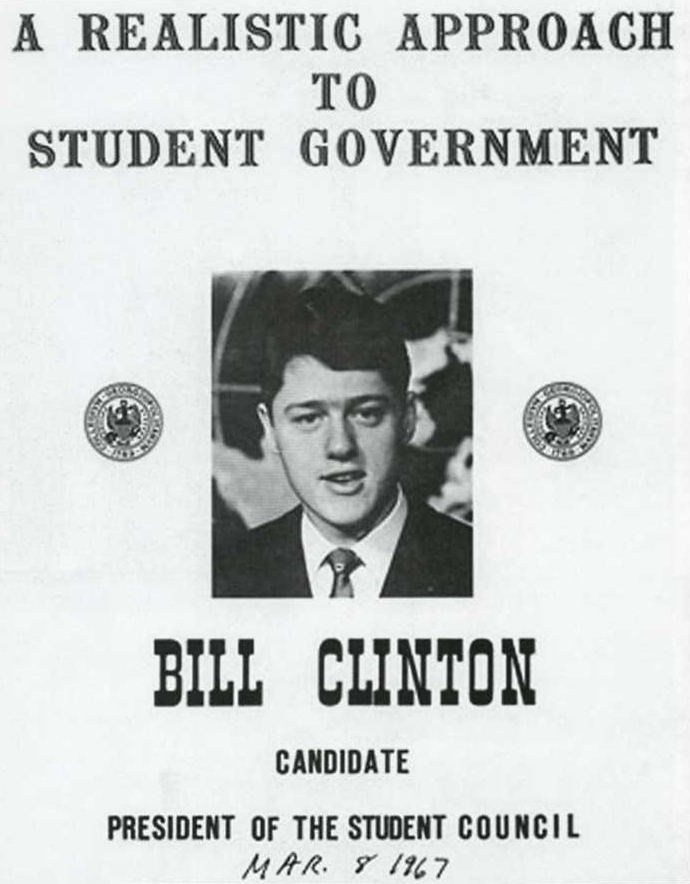
Clinton ran for president of the Student Council while attending the School of Foreign Service at Georgetown University.

With the aid of scholarships, Clinton attended the School of Foreign Service at Georgetown University in Washington, D.C., receiving a Bachelor of Science in foreign service in 1968. Georgetown was the only university where Clinton applied.

In 1964 and 1965, Clinton won elections for class president. From 1964 to 1967, he was an intern and then a clerk in the office of Arkansas senator J. William Fulbright. While in college, he became a brother of service fraternity Alpha Phi Omega and was elected to Phi Beta Kappa. He is a member of Kappa Kappa Psi honorary band fraternity.

=== Oxford ===
Upon graduating from Georgetown in 1968, Clinton won a Rhodes Scholarship to University College, Oxford, where he initially read for a B.Phil. in philosophy, politics, and economics but transferred to a B.Litt. in politics and, ultimately, a B.Phil. in politics. Clinton did not expect to return for the second year because of the draft and so he switched programs; this type of activity was common among other Rhodes Scholars from his cohort. He was offered the opportunity to study at Yale Law School, so he left early to return to the United States and did not receive a degree from Oxford.

Clinton befriended fellow American Rhodes Scholar Frank Aller during his time at Oxford. In 1969, Aller received a draft letter that mandated deployment to the Vietnam War. Aller's 1971 suicide had an influential impact on Clinton. British writer and feminist Sara Maitland said of Clinton, "I remember Bill and Frank Aller taking me to a pub in Walton Street in the summer term of 1969 and talking to me about the Vietnam War. I knew nothing about it, and when Frank began to describe the napalming of civilians I began to cry. Bill said that feeling bad wasn't good enough. That was the first time I encountered the idea that liberal sensitivities weren't enough and you had to do something about such things." Clinton was a member of the Oxford University Basketball Club and also played for Oxford University's rugby union team.

While Clinton was president in 1994, he received an honorary Doctor of Civil Law degree and a fellowship from the University of Oxford, specifically for being "a doughty and tireless champion of the cause of world peace", having "a powerful collaborator in his wife", and for winning "general applause for his achievement of resolving the gridlock that prevented an agreed budget".

=== Vietnam War opposition and draft controversy ===
During the Vietnam War, Clinton received educational draft deferments while he was in England in 1968 and 1969. While at Oxford, he participated in Vietnam War protests and organized a Moratorium to End the War in Vietnam event in October 1969. He was planning to attend law school in the U.S. and knew he might lose his deferment. Clinton tried unsuccessfully to obtain positions in the National Guard and the Air Force officer candidate school, and he then made arrangements to join the Reserve Officers' Training Corps (ROTC) program at the University of Arkansas.

He subsequently decided not to join the ROTC, saying in a letter to the officer in charge of the program that he opposed the war, but did not think it was honorable to use ROTC, National Guard, or Reserve service to avoid serving in Vietnam. He further stated that because he opposed the war, he would not volunteer to serve in uniform, but would subject himself to the draft, and would serve if selected only as a way "to maintain my political viability within the system". Clinton registered for the draft and received a high number (311), meaning that those whose birthdays had been drawn as numbers 1 to 310 would be drafted before him, making it unlikely he would be called up. (In fact, the highest number drafted was 195.) Colonel Eugene Holmes, the Army officer involved with Clinton's ROTC application, issued a notarized statement during the 1992 presidential campaign stating that he suspected Clinton attempted to manipulate the situation to avoid the draft.

During the 1992 campaign, it was revealed that Clinton's uncle had attempted to secure him a position in the Navy Reserve, which would have prevented him from being deployed to Vietnam. This effort was unsuccessful and Clinton said in 1992 that he had been unaware of it until then. Although legal, Clinton's actions with respect to the draft and deciding whether to serve in the military were criticized during his first presidential campaign by conservatives and some Vietnam veterans, some of whom charged that he had used Fulbright's influence to avoid military service. Clinton's 1992 campaign manager, James Carville, successfully argued that Clinton's letter in which he declined to join the ROTC should be made public, insisting that voters, many of whom had also opposed the Vietnam War, would understand and appreciate his position.

=== Law school ===
After Oxford, Clinton attended Yale Law School and earned a Juris Doctor (J.D.) degree in 1973. In 1971, he met his future wife, Hillary Rodham, in the Yale Law Library; she was a class year ahead of him. They began dating and were soon inseparable. After only about a month, Clinton postponed his summer plans to be a coordinator for the George McGovern campaign for the 1972 United States presidential election to move in with her in California. The couple continued living together in New Haven when they returned to law school.

Clinton eventually moved to Texas with Rodham in 1972 to take a job leading McGovern's effort there. He spent considerable time in Dallas, at the campaign's local headquarters on Lemmon Avenue, where he had an office. Clinton worked with future two-term mayor of Dallas Ron Kirk, future governor of Texas Ann Richards, and then unknown television director and filmmaker Steven Spielberg.

== Early political career ==
After graduating from Yale Law School, Clinton returned to Arkansas and became a law professor at the University of Arkansas. In 1974, he ran for the House of Representatives. Running in the conservative 3rd district against incumbent Republican John Paul Hammerschmidt, Clinton's campaign was bolstered by the anti-Republican and anti-incumbent mood resulting from the Watergate scandal. Hammerschmidt, who had received 77% of the vote in 1972, defeated Clinton by only a 52% to 48% margin. In 1976, Clinton ran for Arkansas attorney general. Defeating the secretary of state and the deputy attorney general in the Democratic primary, Clinton was elected with no opposition in the general election, as no Republican had run for the office.

== Governor of Arkansas (1979–1981, 1983–1992) ==
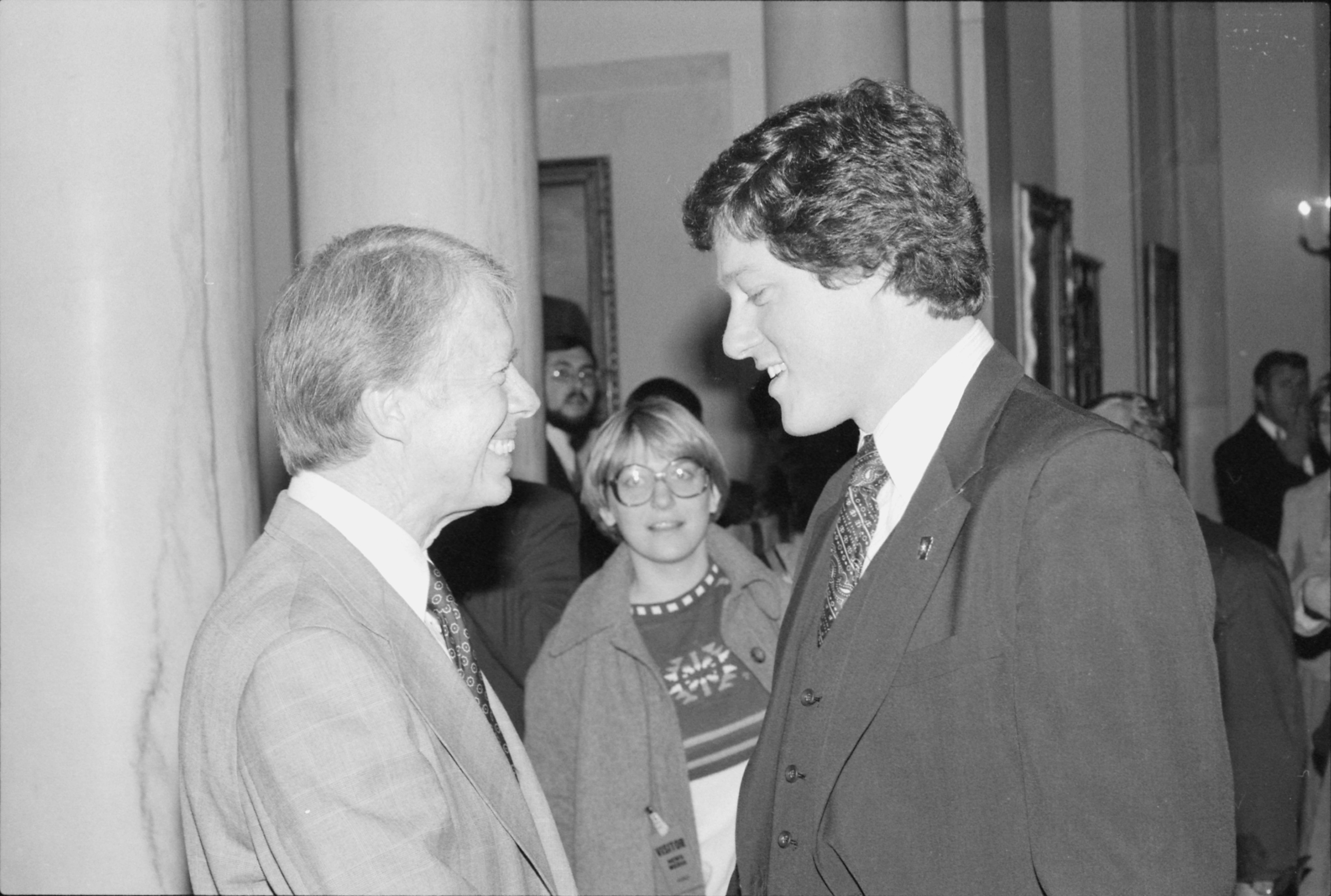
Clinton meets with President Jimmy Carter, 1978.

In 1978, Clinton entered the Arkansas gubernatorial primary. At just 31 years old, he was one of the youngest gubernatorial candidates in the state's history. Clinton was elected Governor of Arkansas in 1978, having defeated the Republican candidate Lynn Lowe, a farmer from Texarkana. Clinton was only 32 years old when he took office, the youngest governor in the country at the time and the second youngest governor in the history of Arkansas. Due to his youthful appearance, Clinton was often called the "Boy Governor". He worked on educational reform and directed the maintenance of Arkansas's roads, with wife Hillary leading a successful committee on urban health care reform. However, his term included an unpopular motor vehicle tax and citizens' anger over the escape of Cuban refugees (from the Mariel boatlift) detained in Fort Chaffee in 1980. Monroe Schwarzlose, of Kingsland in Cleveland County, polled 31 percent of the vote against Clinton in the Democratic gubernatorial primary of 1980. Some suggested Schwarzlose's unexpected voter turnout foreshadowed Clinton's defeat by Republican challenger Frank D. White in the general election that year. As Clinton once joked, he was the youngest ex-governor in the nation's history.

After leaving office in January 1981, Clinton joined friend Bruce Lindsey's Little Rock law firm of Wright, Lindsey and Jennings. In 1982, he was elected governor a second time and kept the office for ten years. Effective with the 1986 election, Arkansas had changed its gubernatorial term of office from two to four years. During his term, he helped transform Arkansas's economy and improved the state's educational system. For senior citizens, he removed the sales tax from medications and increased the home property-tax exemption. He became a leading figure among the New Democrats, a group of Democrats who advocated welfare reform, smaller government, and other policies not supported by liberals. Formally organized as the Democratic Leadership Council (DLC), the New Democrats argued that in light of President Ronald Reagan's landslide victory in 1984, the Democratic Party needed to adopt a more centrist political stance in order to succeed at the national level. Clinton delivered the Democratic response to Reagan's 1985 State of the Union Address and served as chair of the National Governors Association from 1986 to 1987, bringing him to an audience beyond Arkansas.

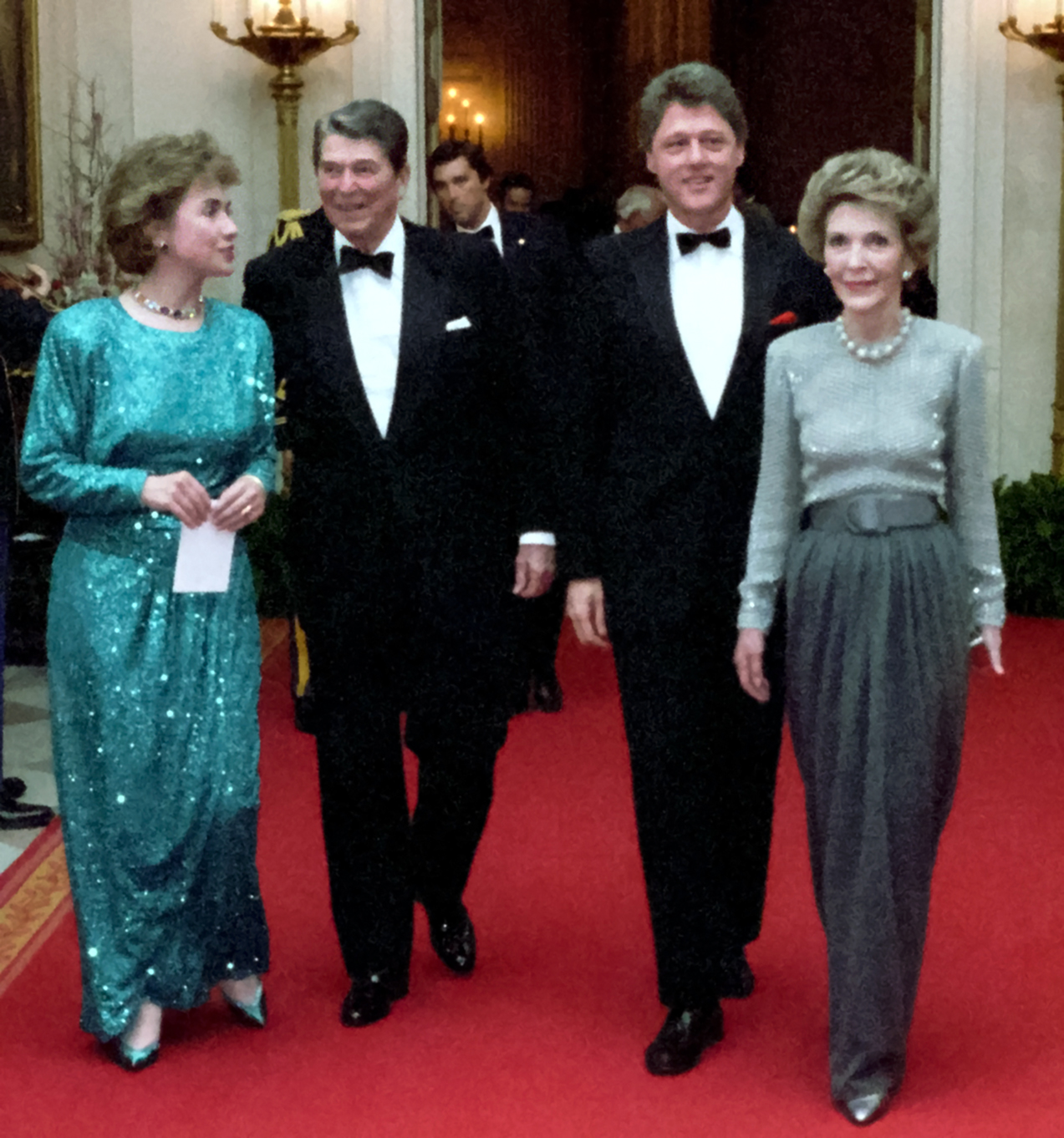
Governor and Mrs. Clinton attend the Dinner Honoring the Nation's Governors in the White House with President Ronald Reagan and first lady Nancy Reagan, 1987.

In the early 1980s, Clinton made reform of the Arkansas education system a top priority of his gubernatorial administration. The Arkansas Education Standards Committee was chaired by Clinton's wife Hillary, who was also an attorney as well as the chair of the Legal Services Corporation. The committee transformed Arkansas's education system. Proposed reforms included more spending for schools (supported by a sales-tax increase), better opportunities for gifted children, vocational education, higher teachers' salaries, more course variety, and compulsory teacher competency exams. The reforms passed in September 1983 after Clinton called a special legislative session—the longest in Arkansas history. Many have considered this the greatest achievement of the Clinton governorship. He defeated four Republican candidates for governor: Lowe (1978), White (1982 and 1986), Jonesboro businessmen Woody Freeman (1984), and Sheffield Nelson of Little Rock (1990).

Also in the 1980s, the Clintons' personal and business affairs included transactions that became the basis of the Whitewater controversy investigation, which later dogged his presidential administration. After extensive investigation over several years, no indictments were made against the Clintons related to the years in Arkansas.

According to some sources, Clinton was a death penalty opponent in his early years, but he eventually switched positions. However he might have felt previously, by 1992, Clinton was insisting that Democrats "should no longer feel guilty about protecting the innocent". During Clinton's final term as governor, Arkansas performed its first executions since 1964 (the death penalty had been reinstated in 1976). As governor, he oversaw the first four executions carried out by the state of Arkansas since the death penalty was reinstated there in 1976: one by electric chair and three by lethal injection. To draw attention to his stance on capital punishment, Clinton flew home to Arkansas mid-campaign in 1992, in order to affirm in person that the controversial execution of Ricky Ray Rector would go forward as scheduled.

=== Scandals and allegations ===
During his time as governor in the 1980s, Arkansas was the center of a drug smuggling operation through Mena Airport. CIA agent Barry Seal allegedly imported three to five billion dollars' worth of cocaine through the airport, and the operation was linked to the Iran–Contra affair. Clinton was accused of knowing about this operation, although nothing could be proven against him. Journalist Sam Smith tied him to various questionable business dealings. Clinton was also accused by Gennifer Flowers to have used cocaine as governor and his half-brother Roger was sentenced to prison in 1985 for possession and smuggling of cocaine, but was later pardoned by his brother after serving his sentence. During his time in Arkansas, there were also other scandals such as the Whitewater controversy involving the Clintons' real estate dealings, and Bill Clinton was accused of serious sexual misconduct in Arkansas, including allegations of using the Arkansas State Police to gain access to women (Troopergate affair). The killing of Don Henry and Kevin Ives in 1987 started various conspiracy theories that accused Clinton and the Arkansas state authorities of covering up the crime.

=== 1988 Democratic presidential primaries ===
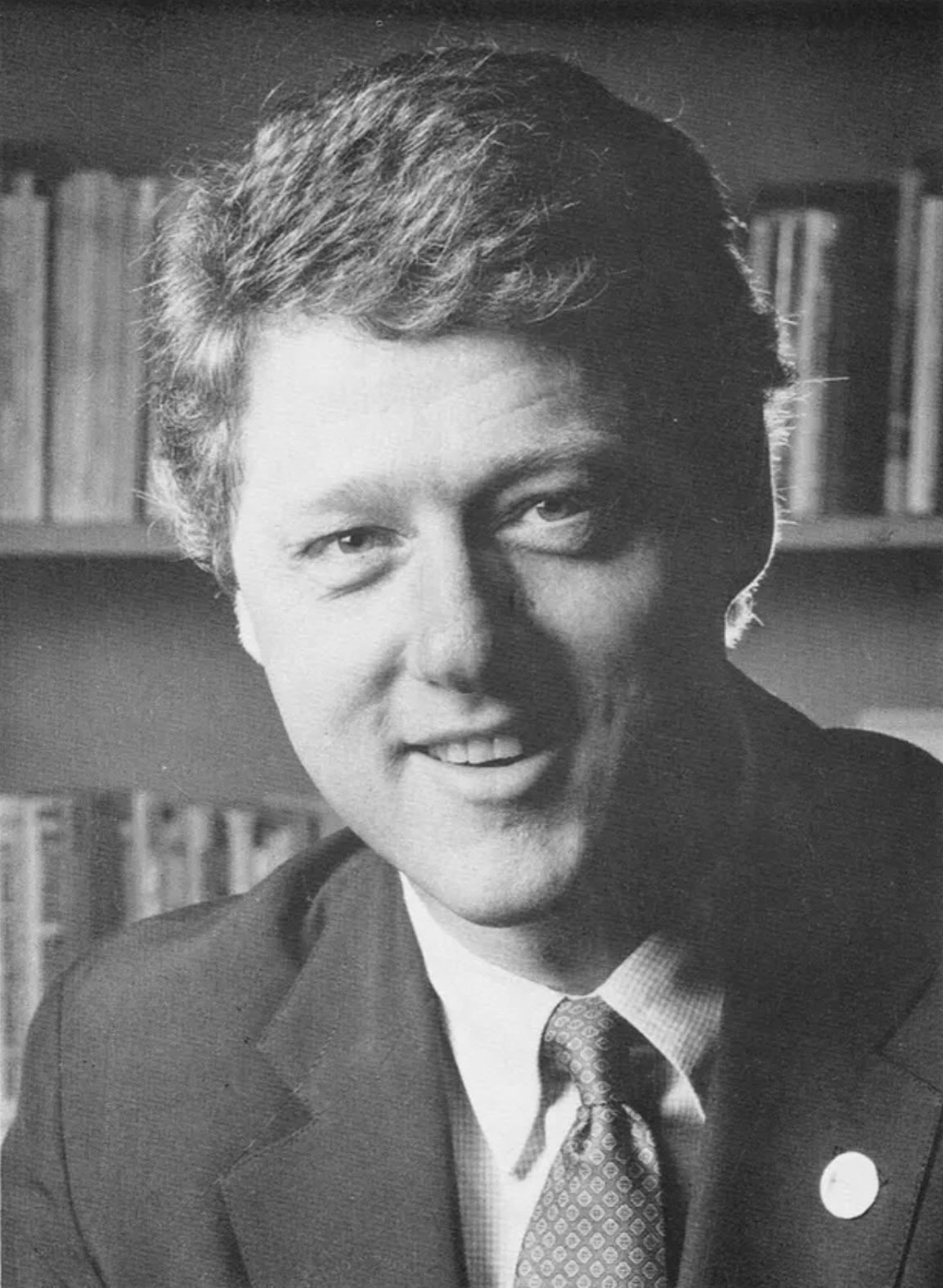
Clinton in 1986

In 1987, the media speculated that Clinton would enter the presidential race. Clinton decided to remain as Arkansas governor (following consideration for the potential candidacy of Hillary for governor, initially favored—but ultimately vetoed—by the First Lady). For the nomination, Clinton endorsed Massachusetts governor Michael Dukakis. He gave the nationally televised opening night address at the 1988 Democratic National Convention, but his speech, which was 33 minutes long and twice the length it was expected to be, was criticized for being too long. Clinton presented himself both as a moderate and as a member of the New Democrat wing of the Democratic Party, and he headed the moderate Democratic Leadership Council in 1990 and 1991.

== Presidential campaigns ==
=== 1992 presidential candidacy ===
In the first primary contest, the Iowa Caucus, Clinton finished a distant third to Iowa senator Tom Harkin. During the campaign for the New Hampshire primary, reports surfaced that Clinton had engaged in an extramarital affair with Gennifer Flowers. Clinton fell far behind former Massachusetts senator Paul Tsongas in the New Hampshire polls. Following Super Bowl XXVI, Clinton and his wife Hillary went on 60 Minutes to rebut the charges. Their television appearance was a calculated risk, but Clinton regained several delegates. He finished second to Tsongas in the New Hampshire primary, but after trailing badly in the polls and coming within single digits of winning, the media viewed it as a victory. News outlets labeled him "The Comeback Kid" for earning a firm second-place finish.

Winning the big prizes of Florida and Texas and many of the Southern primaries on Super Tuesday gave Clinton a sizable delegate lead. However, former California governor Jerry Brown was scoring victories and Clinton had yet to win a significant contest outside his native South. With no major Southern state remaining, Clinton targeted New York, which had many delegates. He scored a resounding victory in New York City, shedding his image as a regional candidate. Having been transformed into the consensus candidate, he secured the Democratic Party nomination, finishing with a victory in Jerry Brown's home state of California.

During the campaign, questions of conflict of interest regarding state business and the politically powerful Rose Law Firm, at which Hillary Rodham Clinton was a partner, arose. Clinton argued the questions were moot because all transactions with the state had been deducted before determining Hillary's firm pay. Further concern arose when Bill Clinton announced that, with Hillary, voters would be getting two presidents "for the price of one".

Clinton was still the governor of Arkansas while campaigning for U.S. president, and he returned to his home state to see that Ricky Ray Rector would be executed. After killing a police officer and a civilian, Rector shot himself in the head, leading to what his lawyers said was a state where he could still talk but did not understand the idea of death. According to both Arkansas state law and federal law, a seriously mentally impaired inmate cannot be executed. The courts disagreed with the allegation of grave mental impairment and allowed the execution. Clinton's return to Arkansas for the execution was framed in an article for The New York Times as a possible political move to counter "soft on crime" accusations.

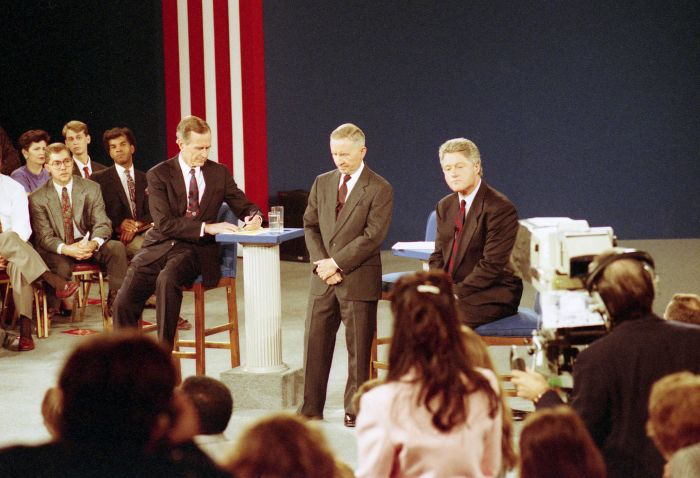
Clinton debating Bush and Perot on October 15, 1992

Bush's approval ratings were around 80 percent during the Gulf War, and he was described as being unbeatable. When Bush compromised with Democrats to try to lower federal deficits, he reneged on his promise not to raise taxes, which hurt his approval rating. Clinton repeatedly condemned Bush for making a promise he failed to keep. By election time, the economy was souring and Bush saw his approval rating plummet to just slightly over 40 percent. Finally, conservatives were previously united by anti-communism, but with the end of the Cold War, the party lacked a uniting issue. When Pat Buchanan and Pat Robertson addressed Christian themes at the Republican National Convention—with Bush criticizing Democrats for omitting God from their platform—many moderates were alienated. Clinton then pointed to his moderate, "New Democrat" record as Governor of Arkansas, though some on the more liberal side of the party remained suspicious. Many Democrats who had supported Ronald Reagan and Bush in previous elections switched their support to Clinton. Clinton and his running mate, Al Gore, toured the country during the final weeks of the campaign, shoring up support and pledging a "new beginning".

On March 26, 1992, during a Democratic fund raiser of the presidential campaign, Robert Rafsky confronted then Gov. Bill Clinton of Arkansas and asked what he was going to do about AIDS, to which Clinton replied, "I feel your pain". The televised exchange led to AIDS becoming an issue in the 1992 presidential election. On April 4, then candidate Clinton met with members of ACT UP and other leading AIDS advocates to discuss his AIDS agenda and agreed to make a major AIDS policy speech, to have people with HIV speak to the Democratic Convention, and to sign onto the AIDS United Action five point plan.

1992 electoral vote results. Clinton won 370–168.

Clinton won the 1992 presidential election (370 electoral votes) against Republican incumbent George H. W. Bush (168 electoral votes) and billionaire populist Ross Perot (zero electoral votes), who ran as an independent on a platform that focused on domestic issues. Bush's steep decline in public approval was a significant part of Clinton's success. Clinton's victory in the election ended twelve years of Republican rule of the White House and twenty of the previous twenty-four years. The election gave Democrats full control of the United States Congress, the first time one party controlled both the executive and legislative branches since Democrats held the 96th United States Congress during the presidency of Jimmy Carter.

According to Seymour Martin Lipset, the 1992 election had several unique characteristics. Voters felt that economic conditions were worse than they actually were, which harmed Bush. A rare event was the presence of a strong third-party candidate. Liberals launched a backlash against 12 years of a conservative White House. The chief factor was Clinton's uniting his party, and winning over a number of heterogeneous groups.

=== 1996 presidential candidacy ===
1996 electoral vote results. Clinton won 379–159.

Leading up to the 1996 presidential election, Clinton's chances of being re-elected initially seemed slim, partially due to his growing untrust among the general public due to the Whitewater controversy and the lopsided defeat of national Democrats in the 1994 elections. His approval rating got as low as 40 percent in early 1995, which led to several high-profile Democrats suggesting he drop out of the race. However, in mid-1995, as a result of a rebounding economy and the growing unpopularity of congressional Republicans, public opinion of Clinton up-ticked and early 1996 polls found he had a lead of up to 20 points over his likely Republican opponent Bob Dole.

Unlike Bush in the 1992 election, Clinton's incumbency greatly benefited him in the general election, as most Americans felt the country was going in the right direction. Along with Dole, Clinton once again faced Ross Perot, who was nominated by the Reform Party, but he garnered significantly less support than he did in the 1992 election. In the month leading up the election, pundits were predicting a big win for Clinton, as his approval rating saw a high of 60 percent and pollsters finding he was favored with voters in over 30 states.

On election day, Clinton won 379 electoral votes, securing reelection and defeating Dole, who received 159 electoral votes. Clinton garnered 49.2 percent of the popular vote to Dole's 40.7 percent and Perot's 8.4 percent. With his victory, he became the first Democrat to win two consecutive presidential elections since Franklin D. Roosevelt.

== Presidency (1993–2001) ==
Clinton's "third way" of moderate liberalism built up the nation's fiscal health and put the nation on a firm footing abroad amid globalization and the development of anti-American terrorist organizations.

During his presidency, Clinton advocated for a wide variety of legislation and programs, most of which were enacted into law or implemented by the executive branch. His policies, particularly the North American Free Trade Agreement and welfare reform, have been attributed to a centrist Third Way philosophy of governance. His policy of fiscal conservatism helped to reduce deficits on budgetary matters. Clinton presided over the longest period of peacetime economic expansion in American history. "The Republican response in Clinton's first term was the scorched earth policies of Newt Gingrich, achieved through the threat of government shut-downs." - Stanley N. Katz, Ph. D.

The Congressional Budget Office reported budget surpluses of $69 billion in 1998, $126 billion in 1999, and $236 billion in 2000, during the last three years of Clinton's presidency. Over the years of the recorded surplus, the gross national debt rose each year. At the end of the fiscal year (September 30) for each of the years a surplus was recorded, the U.S. Treasury reported a gross debt of $5.413 trillion in 1997, $5.526 trillion in 1998, $5.656 trillion in 1999, and $5.674 trillion in 2000. Over the same period, the Office of Management and Budget reported an end of year (December 31) gross debt of $5.369 trillion in 1997, $5.478 trillion in 1998, $5.606 in 1999, and $5.629 trillion in 2000. At the end of his presidency, the Clintons moved to 15 Old House Lane in Chappaqua, New York, in order to quell political worries about his wife's residency for election as a U.S. senator from New York.

=== First term (1993–1997) ===
First inauguration of Bill Clinton (January 20, 1993)
Video of the First inauguration of Bill Clinton

First inauguration of Bill Clinton (January 20, 1993)
audio only version

"Our democracy must be not only the envy of the world but the engine of our own renewal. There is nothing wrong with America that cannot be cured by what is right with America."

— Inaugural address, January 20, 1993.

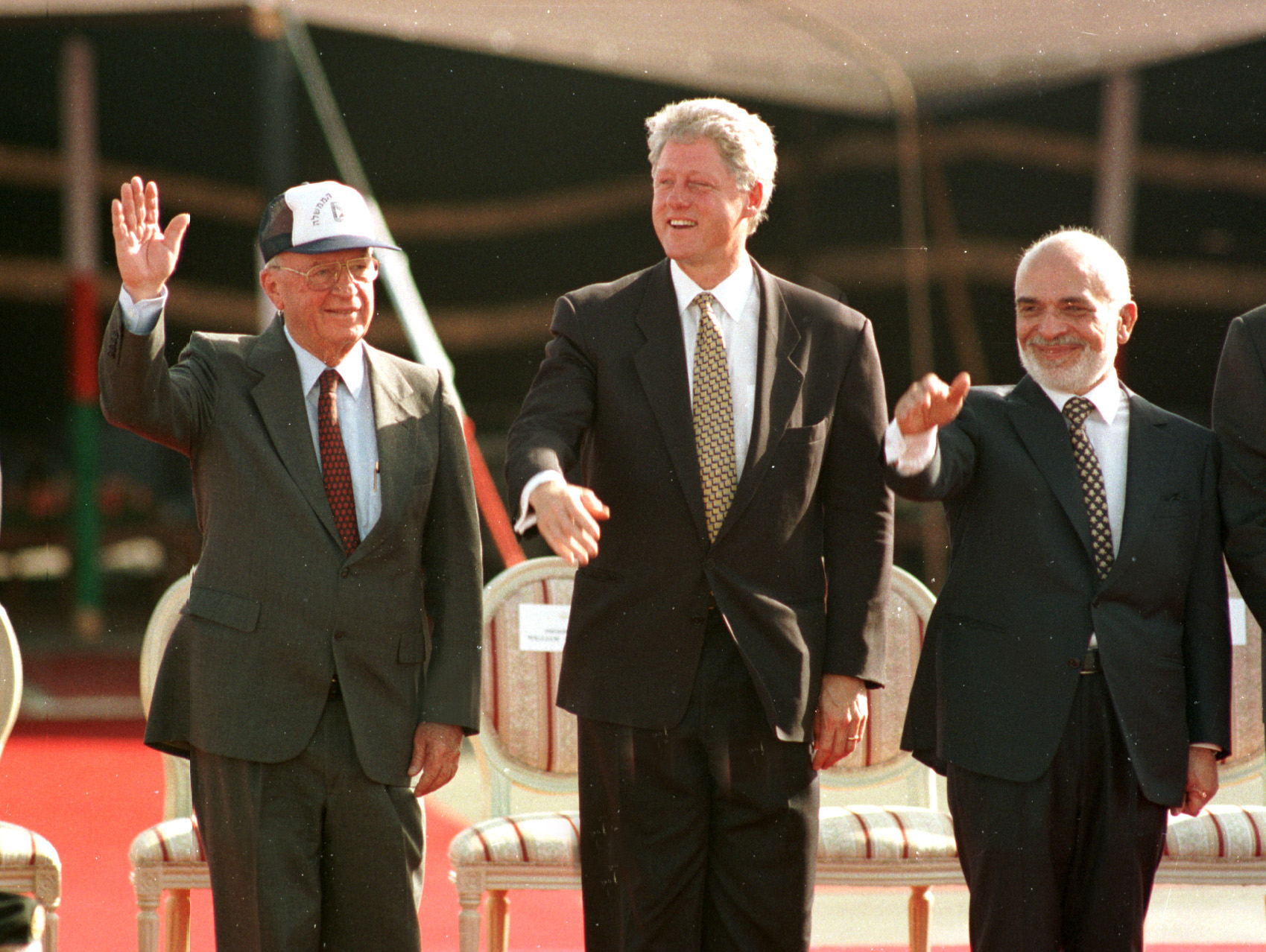
Clinton during the signing of the Israel–Jordan peace treaty, with Yitzhak Rabin (left) and King Hussein of Jordan (right)

After his presidential transition, Clinton was inaugurated as the 42nd president of the United States on January 20, 1993. Clinton was physically exhausted at the time, and had an inexperienced staff. His high levels of public support dropped in the first few weeks, as he made a series of mistakes. His first noimnee for Attorney General, Zoë Baird, had to withdraw after it came to light that she had employed an undocumented immigrant as her child's nanny; his second nominee for the position, Kimba Wood, had to withdraw for the same reason. Clinton had repeatedly promised to encourage gays in the military service, despite what he knew to be the strong opposition of the military leadership. He tried anyway, and was publicly opposed by the top generals, and forced by Congress to a compromise position of "Don't ask, don't tell" whereby homosexuals were allowed serve only if they kept their sexuality a secret. He devised a $16-billion stimulus package primarily to aid inner-city programs desired by liberals, but it was defeated by a Republican filibuster in the Senate. His popularity at the 100 day mark of his term was the lowest of any president at that point.

Public opinion did support one liberal program, and Clinton signed the Family and Medical Leave Act of 1993, which required large employers to allow employees to take unpaid leave for pregnancy or a serious medical condition. This action had bipartisan support, and was popular with the public.

Two days after taking office, on January 22, 1993—the 20th anniversary of the U.S. Supreme Court decision in Roe v. Wade—Clinton reversed restrictions on domestic and international family planning programs that had been imposed by Reagan and Bush. Clinton said abortion should be kept "safe, legal, and rare"—a slogan that had been suggested by political scientist Samuel L. Popkin and first used by Clinton in December 1991, while campaigning. During the eight years of the Clinton administration, the abortion rate declined by 18 percent.

On February 15, 1993, Clinton made his first address to the nation, announcing his plan to raise taxes to close a budget deficit. Two days later, in a nationally televised address to a joint session of Congress, Clinton unveiled his economic plan. The plan focused on reducing the deficit rather than on cutting taxes for the middle class, which had been high on his campaign agenda. Clinton's advisers pressured him to raise taxes, based on the theory that a smaller federal budget deficit would reduce bond interest rates.

President Clinton's attorney general Janet Reno authorized the FBI's use of armored vehicles to deploy tear gas into the buildings of the Branch Davidian community near Waco, Texas, in hopes of ending a 51 day siege. During the operation on April 19, 1993, the buildings caught fire and 75 of the residents died, including 24 children. The raid had originally been planned by the Bush administration; Clinton had played no role.

In August, Clinton signed the Omnibus Budget Reconciliation Act of 1993, which passed Congress without a Republican vote. It cut taxes for 15 million low-income families, made tax cuts available to 90 percent of small businesses, and raised taxes on the wealthiest 1.2 percent of taxpayers. Additionally, it mandated that the budget be balanced over many years through the implementation of spending restraints.

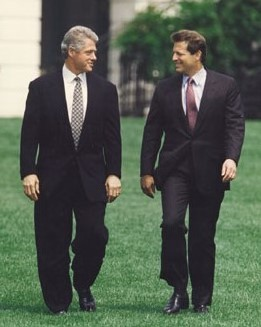
Clinton and Vice President Al Gore on the South Lawn, August 10, 1993

On September 22, 1993, Clinton made a major speech to Congress regarding a health care reform plan; the program aimed at achieving universal coverage through a national health care plan. This was one of the most prominent items on Clinton's legislative agenda and resulted from a task force headed by Hillary Clinton. The plan was well received in political circles, but it was eventually doomed by well-organized lobby opposition from conservatives, the American Medical Association, and the health insurance industry. However, Clinton biographer John F. Harris said the program failed because of a lack of coordination within the White House. Despite the Democratic majority in Congress, the effort to create a national health care system ultimately died when compromise legislation by George J. Mitchell failed to gain a majority of support in August 1994. The failure of the bill was the first major legislative defeat of the Clinton administration.

On November 30, 1993, Clinton signed into law the Brady Bill, which mandated federal background checks on people who purchase firearms in the United States. The law also imposed a five-day waiting period on purchases, until the NICS system was implemented in 1998. He also expanded the Earned Income Tax Credit, a subsidy for low-income workers.

In December of the same year, allegations by Arkansas state troopers Larry Patterson and Roger Perry were first reported by David Brock in The American Spectator. In the affair later known as "Troopergate", the officers alleged that they had arranged sexual liaisons for Clinton when he was Governor of Arkansas. The story mentioned a woman named Paula, a reference to Paula Jones. Brock later apologized to Clinton, saying the article was politically motivated "bad journalism", and that "the troopers were greedy and had slimy motives".

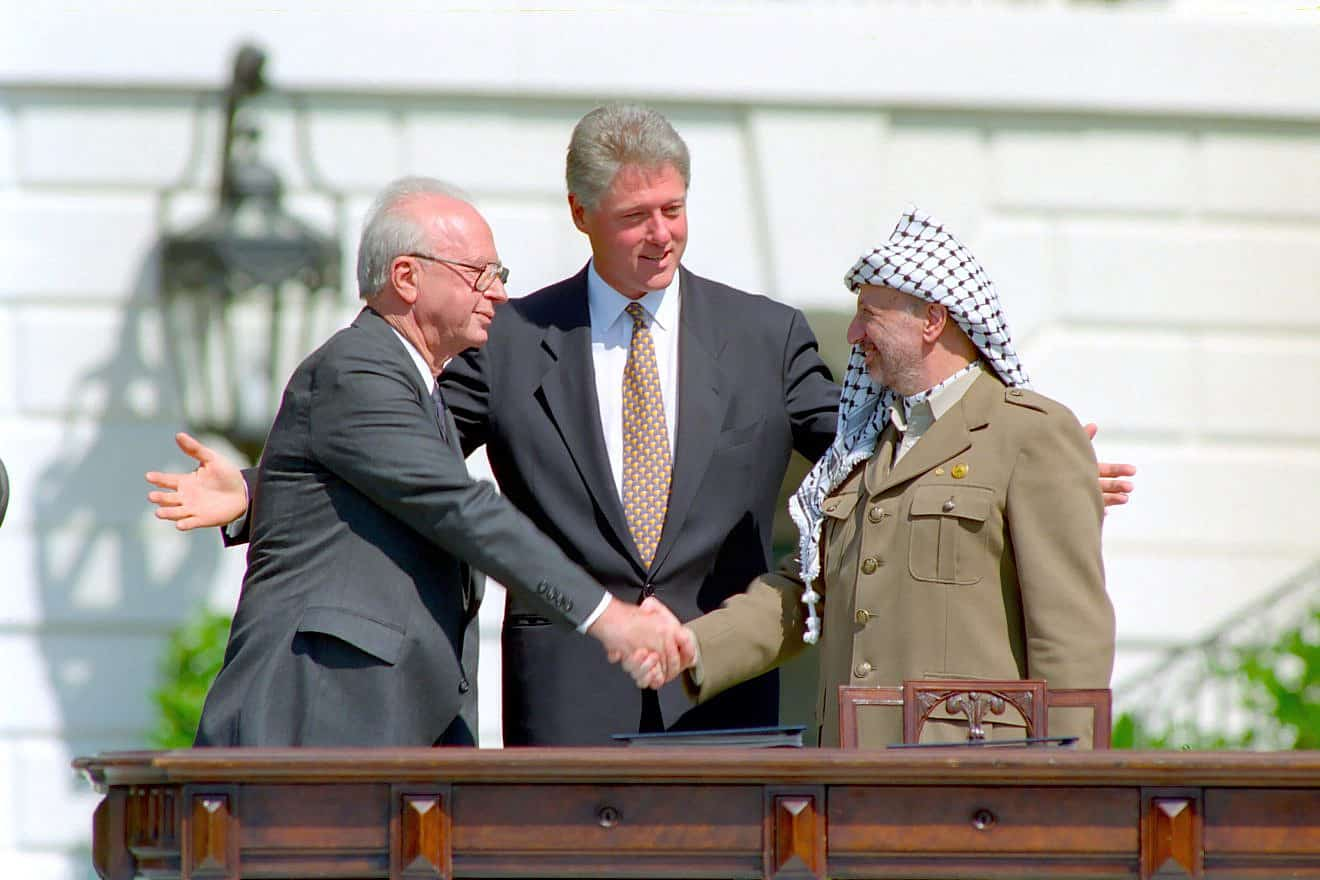
Yitzhak Rabin, Clinton and Yasser Arafat during the Oslo Accords on September 13, 1993

That month, Clinton implemented a Department of Defense directive known as "Don't Ask, Don't Tell", which allowed gay men and women to serve in the armed services provided they kept their sexual orientation a secret. The Act forbade the military from inquiring about an individual's sexual orientation. The policy was developed as a compromise after Clinton's proposal to allow gays to serve openly in the military met staunch opposition from prominent congressional Republicans and Democrats, including senators John McCain (R-AZ) and Sam Nunn (D-GA). According to David Mixner, Clinton's support for the compromise led to a heated dispute with Vice President Al Gore, who felt that "the President should lift the ban ... even though [his executive order] was sure to be overridden by the Congress". Some gay-rights advocates criticized Clinton for not going far enough and accused him of making his campaign promise to get votes and contributions. Their position was that Clinton should have integrated the military by executive order, noting that President Harry S. Truman used executive order to racially desegregate the armed forces. Clinton's defenders argued that an executive order might have prompted the Senate to write the exclusion of gays into law, potentially making it harder to integrate the military in the future. Later in his presidency, in 1999, Clinton criticized the way the policy was implemented, saying he did not think any serious person could say it was not "out of whack". The policy remained controversial, and was finally repealed in 2011, removing open sexual orientation as a reason for dismissal from the armed forces.

Remarks on the Signing of NAFTA (December 8, 1993)
Clinton's December 8, 1993, remarks on the signing of the North American Free Trade Agreement

Remarks on the Signing of NAFTA (December 8, 1993)
audio only version

On January 1, 1994, Clinton signed the North American Free Trade Agreement into law. Throughout his first year in office, Clinton consistently supported ratification of the treaty by the U.S. Senate. Clinton and most of his allies in the Democratic Leadership Committee strongly supported free trade measures; there remained, however, strong disagreement within the party. Opposition came chiefly from anti-trade Republicans, protectionist Democrats and supporters of Ross Perot. The bill passed the house with 234 votes in favor and 200 votes opposed (132 Republicans and 102 Democrats in favor; 156 Democrats, 43 Republicans, and one independent opposed). The treaty was then ratified by the Senate and signed into law by the president.

On July 29, 1994, the Clinton administration launched the first official White House website, whitehouse.gov. The site was followed with three more versions, with the final version being launched on July 21, 2000. The White House website was part of a wider movement of the Clinton administration toward web-based communication. According to Robert Longley, "Clinton and Gore were responsible for pressing almost all federal agencies, the U.S. court system and the U.S. military onto the Internet, thus opening up America's government to more of America's citizens than ever before. On July 17, 1996, Clinton issued Executive Order 13011—Federal Information Technology, ordering the heads of all federal agencies to utilize information technology fully to make the information of the agency easily accessible to the public."

The Omnibus Crime Bill, which Clinton signed into law in September 1994, made many changes to U.S. crime and law enforcement legislation including the expansion of the death penalty to include crimes not resulting in death, such as running a large-scale drug enterprise. During Clinton's re-election campaign he said, "My 1994 crime bill expanded the death penalty for drug kingpins, murderers of federal law enforcement officers, and nearly 60 additional categories of violent felons." It also included a subsection of assault weapons ban for a ten-year period.

After two years of Democratic Party control, the Democrats lost control of Congress to the Republicans in the mid-term elections in 1994, for the first time in forty years.

A speech delivered by President Bill Clinton at the December 6, 1995 White House Conference on HIV/AIDS projected that a cure for AIDS and a vaccine to prevent further infection would be developed. The President focused on his administration's accomplishments and efforts related to the epidemic, including an accelerated drug-approval process. He also condemned homophobia and discrimination against people with HIV. Clinton announced three new initiatives: creating a special working group to coordinate AIDS research throughout the federal government; convening public health experts to develop an action plan that integrates HIV prevention with substance abuse prevention; and launching a new effort by the Department of Justice to ensure that health care facilities provide equal access to people with HIV and AIDS. 1996 would mark the first year since the beginning of the HIV/AIDS epidemic that the number of new HIV/AIDS diagnoses would decline, with the U.S. Centers for Disease Control and Prevention (CDC) even later reporting a significant 47% decline in the number of AIDS-related deaths in 1997 compared to the previous year. Credit for this decline would be given to the growing effectiveness of new drug therapy which was promoted by the Clinton Administration's Department of Health and Human Services, such as highly active antiretroviral therapy (HAART).

Clinton's coat of arms, granted by the Chief Herald of Ireland in 1995

On September 21, 1996, Clinton signed into law the Defense of Marriage Act (DOMA), which defined marriage for federal purposes as the legal union of one man and one woman; the legislation allowed individual states to refuse to recognize gay marriages that were performed in other states. Paul Yandura, speaking for the White House gay and lesbian liaison office, said Clinton's signing DOMA "was a political decision that they made at the time of a re-election". In defense of his actions, Clinton has said that DOMA was intended to "head off an attempt to send a constitutional amendment banning gay marriage to the states", a possibility he described as highly likely in the context of a "very reactionary Congress". Administration spokesman Richard Socarides said, "the alternatives we knew were going to be far worse, and it was time to move on and get the president re-elected." Clinton himself said DOMA was something "which the Republicans put on the ballot to try to get the base vote for Bush up, I think it's obvious that something had to be done to try to keep the Republican Congress from presenting that"; others were more critical. The veteran gay rights and gay marriage activist Evan Wolfson has called these claims "historic revisionism". Despite this, it has been noted that other than a brief written response to a Reader's Digest that questioned whether he agreed with it, Clinton had made no documented reference to the issue of gay marriage until May 1996. In a July 2, 2011, editorial The New York Times opined, "The Defense of Marriage Act was enacted in 1996 as an election-year wedge issue, signed by President Bill Clinton in one of his worst policy moments." Ultimately, in United States v. Windsor, the U.S. Supreme Court struck down DOMA in June 2013.

Despite DOMA, Clinton was the first president to select openly gay persons for administrative positions, and he is generally credited as being the first president to publicly champion gay rights. During his presidency, Clinton issued two substantially controversial executive orders on behalf of gay rights, the first lifting the ban on security clearances for LGBT federal employees and the second outlawing discrimination based on sexual orientation in the federal civilian workforce. Under Clinton's leadership, federal funding for HIV/AIDS research, prevention and treatment more than doubled. Clinton also pushed for passing hate crimes laws for gays and for the private sector Employment Non-Discrimination Act, which, buoyed by his lobbying, failed to pass the Senate by a single vote in 1996. Advocacy for these issues, paired with the politically unpopular nature of the gay rights movement at the time, led to enthusiastic support for Clinton's election and reelection by the Human Rights Campaign. Clinton came out for gay marriage in July 2009 and urged the Supreme Court to overturn DOMA in 2013. He was later honored by GLAAD for his prior pro-gay stances and his reversal on DOMA.

"When I took office, only high energy physicists had ever heard of what is called the Worldwide Web ... Now even my cat has its own page."

— Bill Clinton's announcement of Next Generation Internet initiative, October 1996.

The 1996 United States campaign finance controversy was an alleged effort by China to influence the domestic policies of the United States, before and during the Clinton administration, and involved the fundraising practices of the administration itself. Despite the evidence, the Chinese government denied all accusations.

As part of a 1996 initiative to curb illegal immigration, Clinton signed the Illegal Immigration Reform and Immigrant Responsibility Act (IIRIRA) on September 30, 1996. Appointed by Clinton, the U.S. Commission on Immigration Reform recommended reducing legal immigration from about 800,000 people a year to about 550,000.

In November 1996, Clinton narrowly escaped possible assassination in the Philippines, which was a bridge bomb planted by al-Qaeda and was masterminded by Osama bin Laden. During Clinton's presidency, the attempt remained top secret, and it remains classified as of March 2024, when Reuters reported having spoken with eight retired secret service agents about the incident.

=== Second term (1997–2001) ===
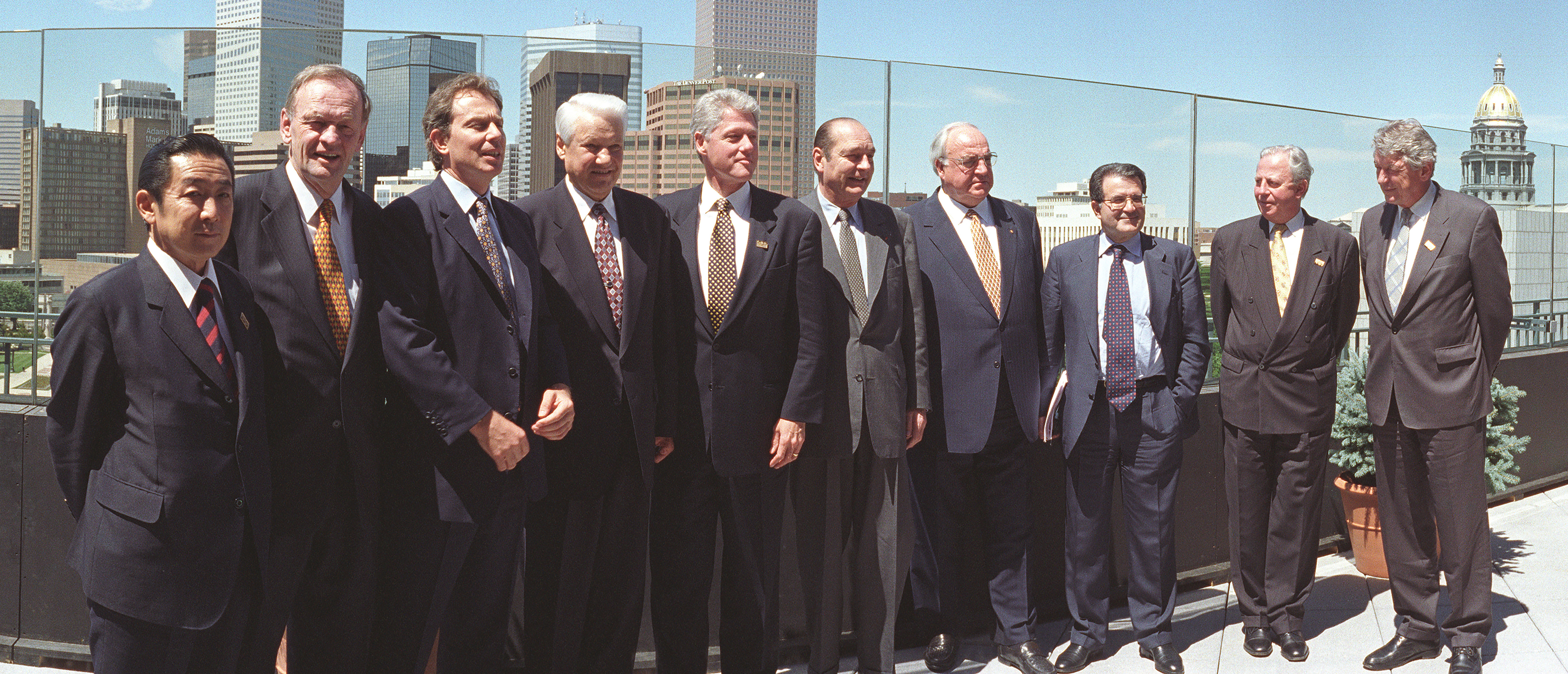
Clinton (center) with other world leaders attending the first G8 Summit, 1997

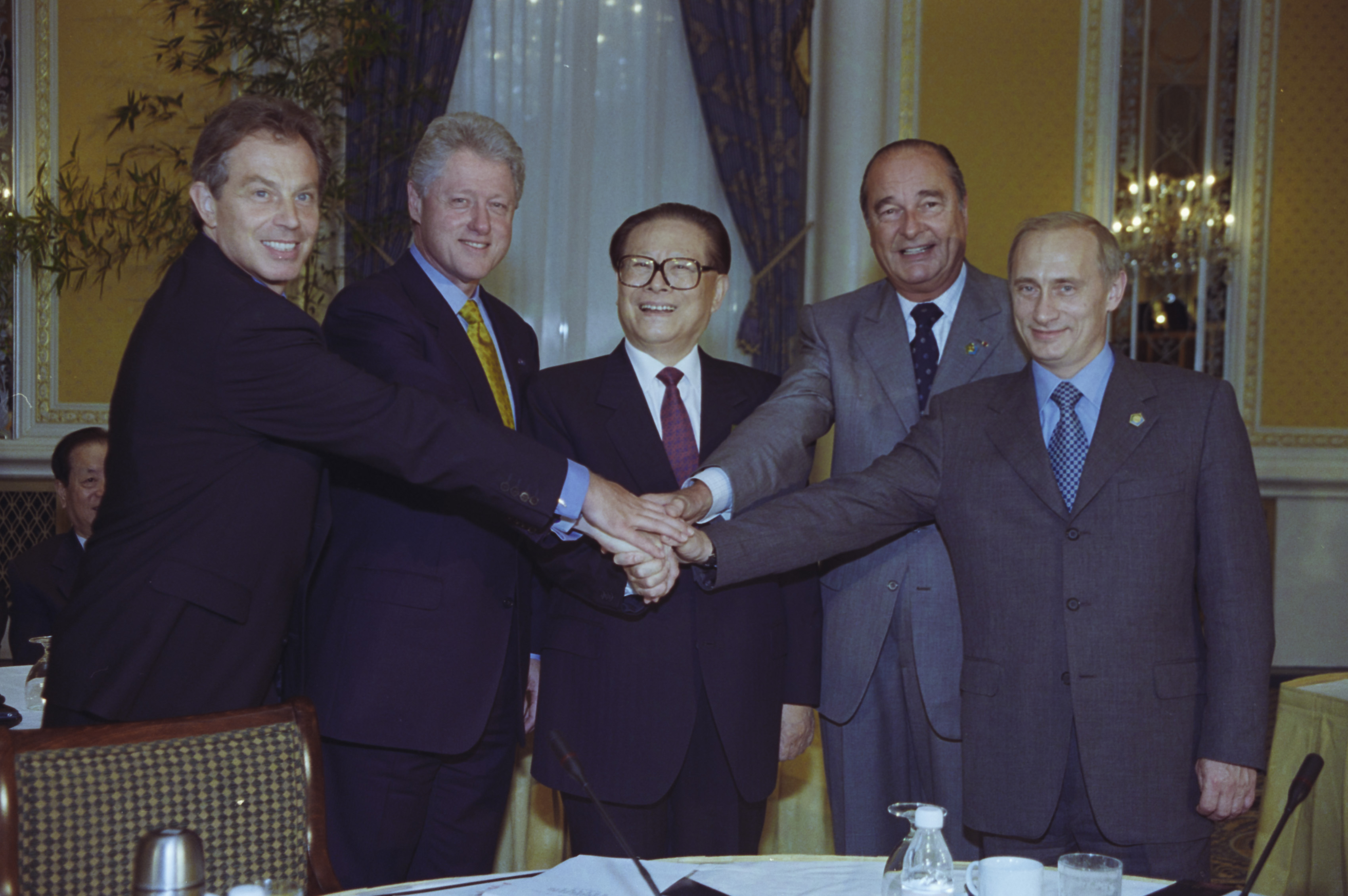
Clinton with British Prime Minister Tony Blair, Chinese President Jiang Zemin, French President Jacques Chirac, and Russian President Vladimir Putin at the Waldorf Astoria on September 7, 2000

In the January 1997 State of the Union address, Clinton proposed a new initiative to provide health coverage to up to five million children. Senators Ted Kennedy—a Democrat—and Orrin Hatch—a Republican—teamed up with Hillary Rodham Clinton and her staff in 1997 and succeeded in passing legislation forming the State Children's Health Insurance Program (SCHIP), the largest successful health care reform in the Clinton Administration. That year, Hillary Clinton shepherded through Congress the Adoption and Safe Families Act and two years later she succeeded in helping pass the Foster Care Independence Act. Bill Clinton negotiated the passage of the Balanced Budget Act of 1997 by the Republican Congress.

In October 1997, Clinton announced he was getting hearing aids, due to hearing loss attributed to his age, and his time spent as a musician in his youth. In 1999, he signed into law the Financial Services Modernization Act also known as the Gramm–Leach–Bliley Act, which repealed the part of the Glass–Steagall Act that had prohibited a bank from offering a full range of investment, commercial banking, and insurance services since its enactment in 1933.

==== Investigations ====
In November 1993, David Hale—the source of criminal allegations against Bill Clinton in the Whitewater controversy—alleged that while Governor of Arkansas, Clinton pressured Hale to provide an illegal $300,000 loan to Susan McDougal, the Clintons' partner in the Whitewater land deal. A U.S. Securities and Exchange Commission investigation resulted in convictions against the McDougals for their role in the Whitewater project, but the Clintons themselves were never charged, and Clinton maintains his and his wife's innocence in the affair. Investigations by Robert B. Fiske and Ken Starr found insufficient to evidence to prosecute the Clintons.

The White House FBI files controversy of June 1996 arose concerning improper access by the White House to FBI security-clearance documents. Craig Livingstone, head of the White House Office of Personnel Security, improperly requested, and received from the FBI, background report files without asking permission of the subject individuals; many of these were employees of former Republican administrations. In March 2000, Independent Counsel Robert Ray determined there was no credible evidence of any crime. Ray's report further stated, "there was no substantial and credible evidence that any senior White House official was involved" in seeking the files.

On May 19, 1993, Clinton fired seven employees of the White House Travel Office. This caused the White House travel office controversy even though the travel office staff served at the pleasure of the president and could be dismissed without cause. The White House responded to the controversy by claiming that the firings were done in response to financial improprieties that had been revealed by a brief FBI investigation. Critics contended that the firings had been done to allow friends of the Clintons to take over the travel business and the involvement of the FBI was unwarranted. The House Government Reform and Oversight Committee issued a report which accused the Clinton administration of having obstructed their efforts to investigate the affair. Special counsel Robert Fiske said that Hillary Clinton was involved in the firing and gave "factually false" testimony to the GAO, congress, and the independent counsel. However Fiske said there was not enough evidence to prosecute.

==== Impeachment and acquittal ====
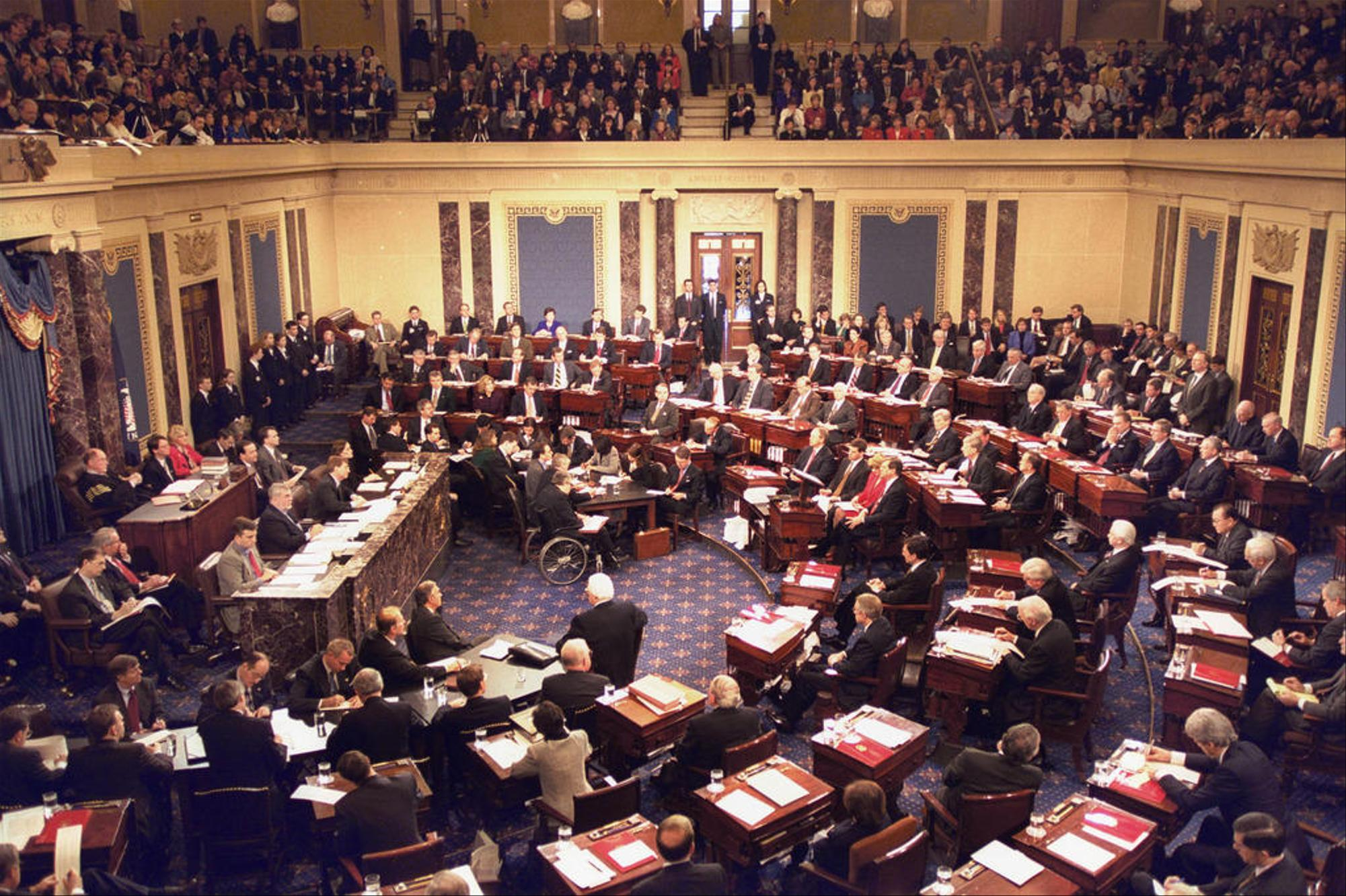
Clinton's impeachment trial in 1999

After a House inquiry, Clinton was impeached on December 19, 1998, by the House of Representatives. The House voted 228–206 to impeach him for perjury to a grand jury and voted 221–212 to impeach him for obstruction of justice. Clinton was only the second U.S. president (the first being Andrew Johnson) to be impeached. Impeachment proceedings were based on allegations that Clinton had illegally lied about and covered up his relationship with 22-year-old White House (and later Department of Defense) employee Monica Lewinsky. After the Starr Report was submitted to the House providing what it termed "substantial and credible information that President Clinton Committed Acts that May Constitute Grounds for an Impeachment", the House began impeachment hearings against Clinton before the mid-term elections. To hold impeachment proceedings, Republican leadership called a lame-duck session in December 1998.

While the House Judiciary Committee hearings ended in a straight party-line vote, there was lively debate on the House floor. The two charges passed in the House (largely with Republican support, but with a handful of Democratic votes as well) were for perjury and obstruction of justice. The perjury charge arose from Clinton's testimony before a grand jury that had been convened to investigate perjury he may have committed in his sworn deposition during Jones v. Clinton, Paula Jones's sexual harassment lawsuit. The obstruction charge was based on his actions to conceal his relationship with Lewinsky before and after that deposition.

The Senate later acquitted Clinton of both charges. The Senate refused to meet to hold an impeachment trial before the end of the old term, so the trial was held over until the next Congress. Clinton was represented by Washington law firm Williams & Connolly. The Senate finished a twenty-one-day trial on February 12, 1999, with the vote of 55 not guilty/45 guilty on the perjury charge and 50 not guilty/50 guilty on the obstruction of justice charge. Both votes fell short of the constitutional two-thirds majority requirement to convict and remove an officeholder. The final vote was generally along party lines, with no Democrats voting guilty, and only a handful of Republicans voting not guilty.

On January 19, 2001, Clinton's law license was suspended for five years after he acknowledged to an Arkansas circuit court he had engaged in conduct prejudicial to the administration of justice in the Jones case. On October 1, the U.S. Supreme Court suspended Clinton from practicing law in the high court, citing fallout from the Lewinsky scandal, but rather than appealing the decision he resigned from the bar entirely.

==== Pardons and commutations ====
Clinton issued 141 pardons and 36 commutations on his last day in office on January 20, 2001. Controversy surrounded Marc Rich and allegations that Hillary Clinton's brother, Hugh Rodham, accepted payments in return for influencing the president's decision-making regarding the pardons. Federal prosecutor Mary Jo White was appointed to investigate the pardon of Rich. She was later replaced by then-Republican James Comey. The investigation found no wrongdoing on Clinton's part. Clinton also pardoned four defendants in the Whitewater Scandal, Chris Wade, Susan McDougal, Stephen Smith, and Robert W. Palmer, all of whom had ties to Clinton when he was Governor of Arkansas. Former Clinton HUD Secretary Henry Cisneros, who pleaded guilty to lying to the FBI, was also among Clinton's pardons.

==== Campaign finance controversies ====
In February 1997 it was discovered upon documents being released by the Clinton Administration that 938 people had stayed at the White House and that 821 of them had made donations to the Democratic Party and got the opportunity to stay in the Lincoln bedroom as a result of the donations. Some donors included Steven Spielberg, Tom Hanks, Jane Fonda, and Judy Collins. Top donors also got golf games and morning jogs with Clinton as a result of the contributions. Janet Reno was called on to investigate the matter by Trent Lott, but she refused.

In 1996, it was found that several Chinese foreigners made contributions to Clinton's reelection campaign and the Democratic National Committee with the backing of the People's Republic of China. Some of them also attempted to donate to Clinton's defense fund. This violated United States law forbidding non-American citizens from making campaign contributions. Clinton and Al Gore also allegedly met with the foreign donors. (Note: Attributed to multiple sources:) A Republican investigation led by Fred Thompson found that Clinton was targeted by the Chinese government. However, Democratic senators Joe Lieberman and John Glenn said that the evidence showed that China only targeted congressional elections and not presidential elections.

=== Military and foreign affairs ===
==== Somalia ====
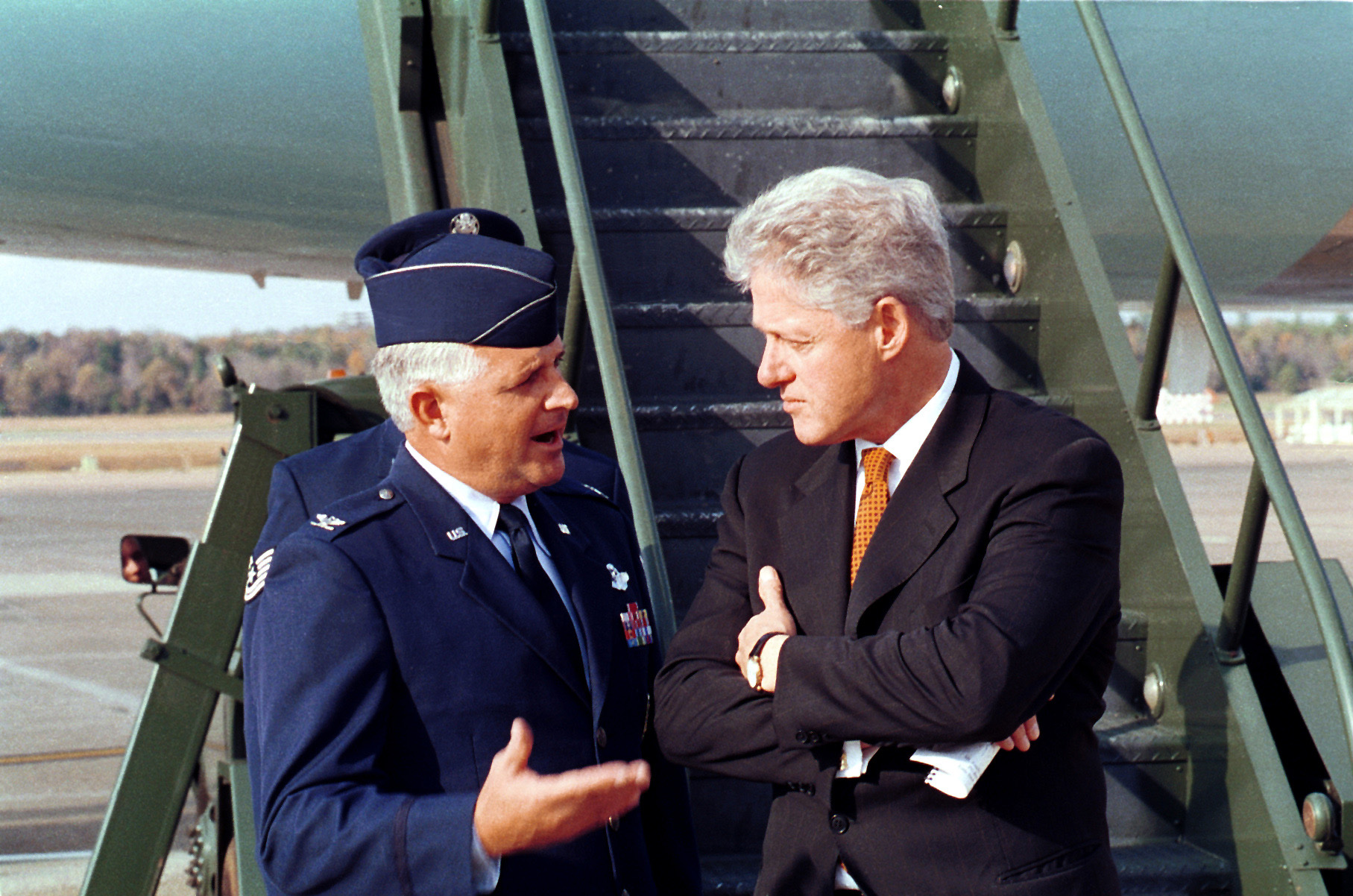
Col. Paul Fletcher, USAF and Clinton speak before boarding Air Force One, November 4, 1999.

American troops had first entered Somalia during the George H. W. Bush administration in response to a humanitarian crisis and civil war. Though initially involved to assist humanitarian efforts, the Clinton administration shifted the objectives set out in the mission and began pursuing a policy of attempting to neutralize Somali warlords. In 1993, during the Battle of Mogadishu, two U.S. helicopters were shot down by rocket-propelled grenade attacks to their tail rotors, trapping soldiers behind enemy lines. This resulted in an urban battle that killed 18 American soldiers, wounded 73 others, and resulted in one being taken prisoner. Television news programs depicted the supporters of warlord Mohammed Aidid desecrating the corpses of troops. The backlash resulting from the incident prompted a drop in support for American intervention in the country and coincided with a more cautious use of troops throughout the rest of the Clinton administration. Following a subsequent national security policy review, U.S. forces were withdrawn from Somalia and later conflicts were approached with fewer soldiers on the ground.

==== Rwanda ====
In April 1994, genocide broke out in Rwanda. Intelligence reports indicate that Clinton was aware a "final solution to eliminate all Tutsis" was underway, long before the administration publicly used the word "genocide". Fearing a reprisal of the events in Somalia the previous year, Clinton chose not to intervene. Clinton has called his failure to intervene one of his main foreign policy failings, saying "I don't think we could have ended the violence, but I think we could have cut it down. And I regret it."

==== Bosnia and Herzegovina ====
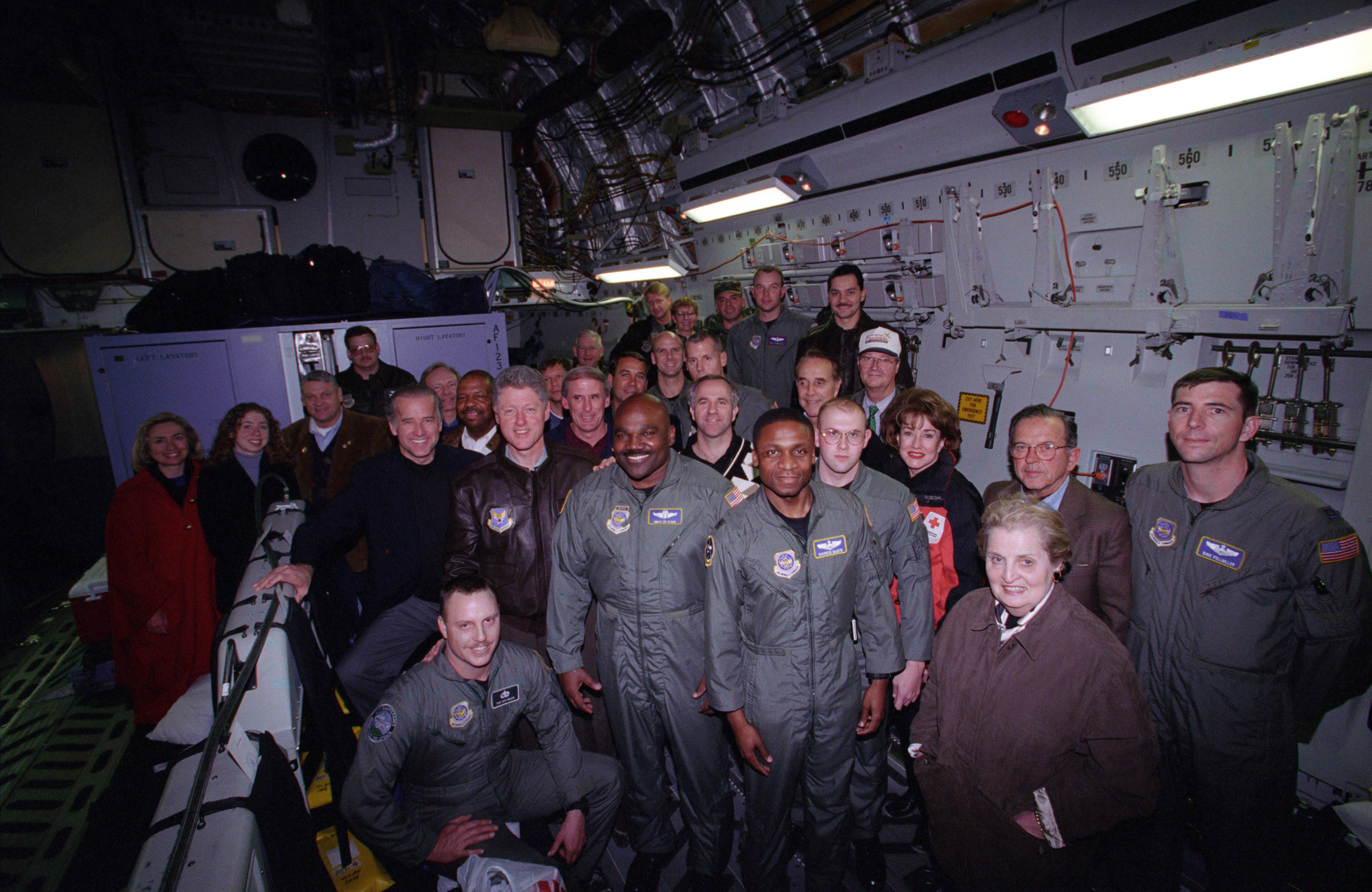
Clinton with the U.S. delegation to Bosnia and Air Force personnel in a flight to Tuzla on December 22, 1997. Clinton is seen alongside future 46th president Joe Biden.

In 1993 and 1994, Clinton pressured Western European leaders to adopt a strong military policy against Bosnian Serbs during the Bosnian War. This strategy faced staunch opposition from the United Nations, NATO allies, and congressional Republicans, leading Clinton to adopt a more diplomatic approach. In 1995, U.S. and NATO aircraft bombed Bosnian Serb targets to halt attacks on UN safe zones and pressure them into a peace accord that would end the Bosnian war. Clinton deployed U.S. peacekeepers to Bosnia in late 1995, to uphold the subsequent Dayton Agreement.

==== Northern Irish peace talks ====
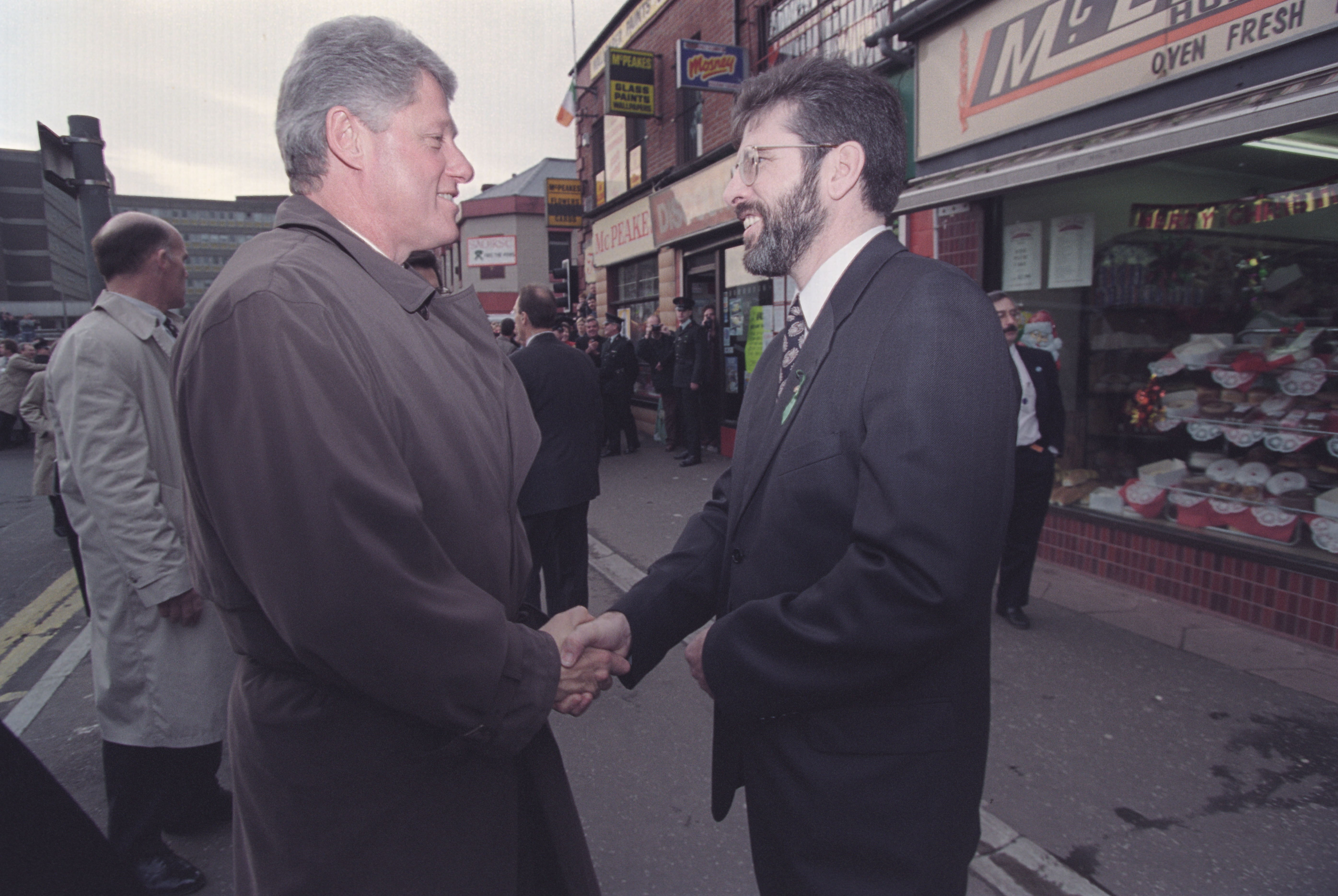
Clinton shaking hands with Gerry Adams outside a business in East Belfast, November 30, 1995

In 1992, before his presidency, Clinton proposed sending a peace envoy to Northern Ireland, but this was dropped to avoid tensions with the British government. In November 1995, in a ceasefire during the Troubles, Clinton became the first president to visit Northern Ireland, examining both of the two divided communities of Belfast. Despite unionist criticism, Clinton used his visit as a way to negotiate an end to the violent conflict, playing a key role in the peace talks that produced the Good Friday Agreement in 1998.

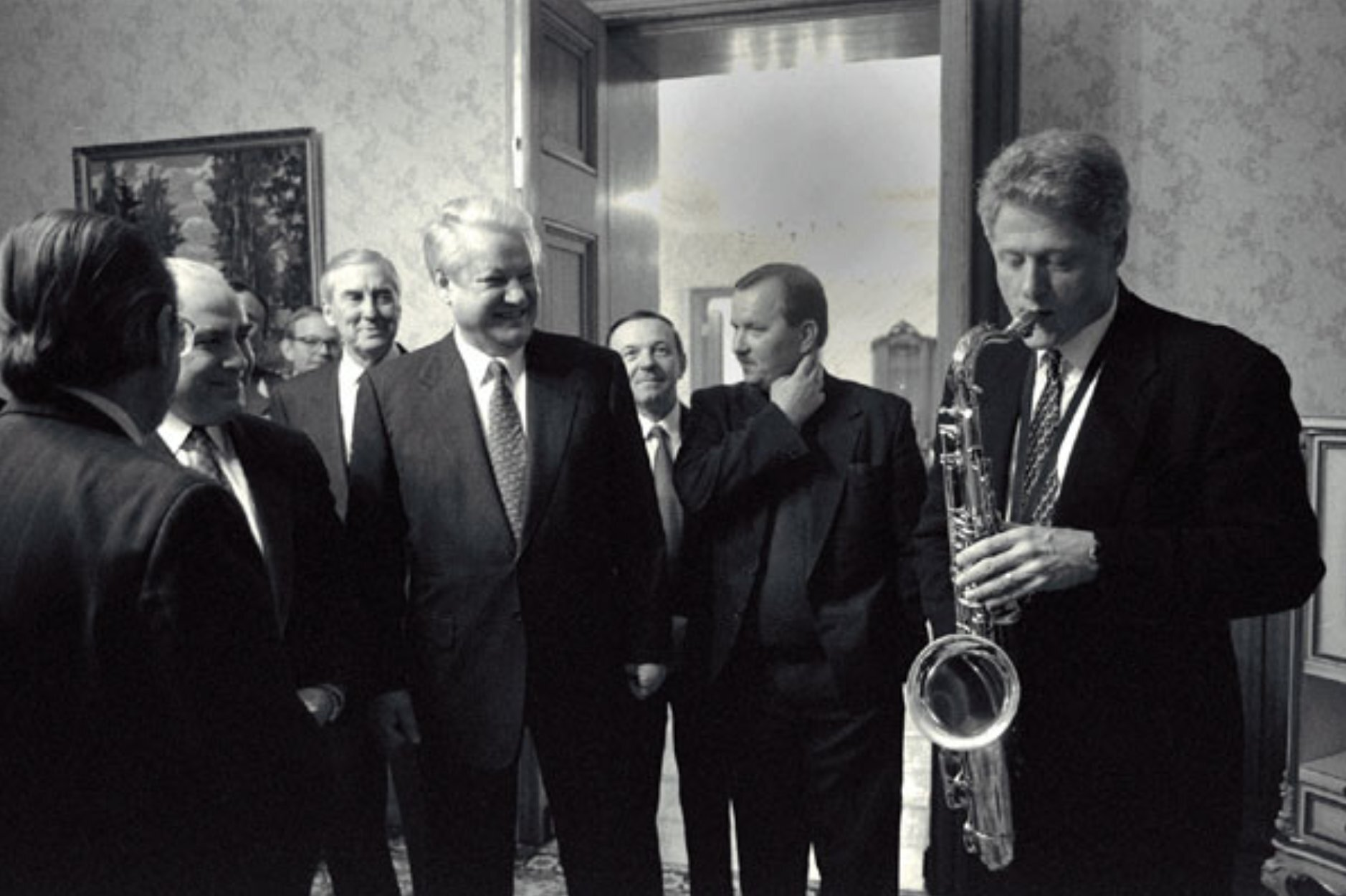
Clinton plays the saxophone presented to him by Russian president Boris Yeltsin at a private dinner in Russia, January 13, 1994.

==== Iran ====
Clinton sought to continue the Bush administration's policy of limiting Iranian influence in the Middle East, which he laid out in the dual containment strategy. In 1994, Clinton declared that Iran was a "state sponsor of terrorism" and a "rogue state", marking the first time that an American president used that term. Subsequent executive orders heavily sanctioned Iran's oil industry and banned almost all trade between U.S. companies and the Iranian government. In February 1996, the Clinton administration agreed to pay Iran US$131.8 million (equivalent to $270.56 million in 2025) in settlement to discontinue a case brought by Iran in 1989 against the U.S. in the International Court of Justice after the shooting down of Iran Air Flight 655 by the U.S. Navy guided missile cruiser.

==== Iraq ====
In Clinton's 1998 State of the Union Address, he warned Congress that Iraqi dictator Saddam Hussein was building an arsenal of chemical, biological and nuclear weapons. However, there was no evidence for that claim.

Clinton signed the Iraq Liberation Act of 1998 on October 31, 1998, which instituted a policy of "regime change" against Iraq, though it explicitly stated it did not provide for direct intervention on the part of American military forces. The administration then launched a four-day bombing campaign named Operation Desert Fox, lasting from December 16 to 19, 1998. At the end of this operation Clinton announced that "So long as Saddam remains in power, he will remain a threat to his people, his region, and the world. With our allies, we must pursue a strategy to contain him and to constrain his weapons of mass destruction program, while working toward the day Iraq has a government willing to live at peace with its people and with its neighbors." American and British aircraft in the Iraq no-fly zones attacked hostile Iraqi air defenses 166 times in 1999 and 78 times in 2000.

==== Osama bin Laden ====
Capturing Osama bin Laden was an objective of the U.S. government during the Clinton presidency (and continued to be until bin Laden's death in 2011). Despite claims by Mansoor Ijaz and Sudanese officials that the Sudanese government had offered to arrest and extradite bin Laden, and that U.S. authorities rejected each offer, the 9/11 Commission Report stated that "we have not found any reliable evidence to support the Sudanese claim".

In response to a 1996 State Department warning about bin Laden and the 1998 bombings of U.S. embassies in East Africa by al-Qaeda (which killed 224 people, including 12 Americans), Clinton ordered several military missions to capture or kill bin Laden, all of which were unsuccessful. In August 1998, Clinton ordered cruise missile strikes on terrorist targets in Afghanistan and Sudan, targeting the Al-Shifa pharmaceutical factory in Sudan, which was suspected of assisting bin Laden in making chemical weapons, and bin Laden's terrorist training camps in Afghanistan. The factory was destroyed by the attack, resulting in the death of one employee and the wounding of 11 other people. After the destruction of the factory, there was a medicine shortage in Sudan due to the plant providing 50 percent of Sudan's medicine, and the destruction of the plant led to a shortage of chloroquine, a drug which is used to treat malaria. U.S. officials later acknowledged that there was no evidence the plant was acknowledging manufacturing or storing nerve gas. The attack provoked criticism of Clinton from journalists and academics including Christopher Hitchens, Seymour Hersh, Max Taylor, and others.

==== Kosovo ====
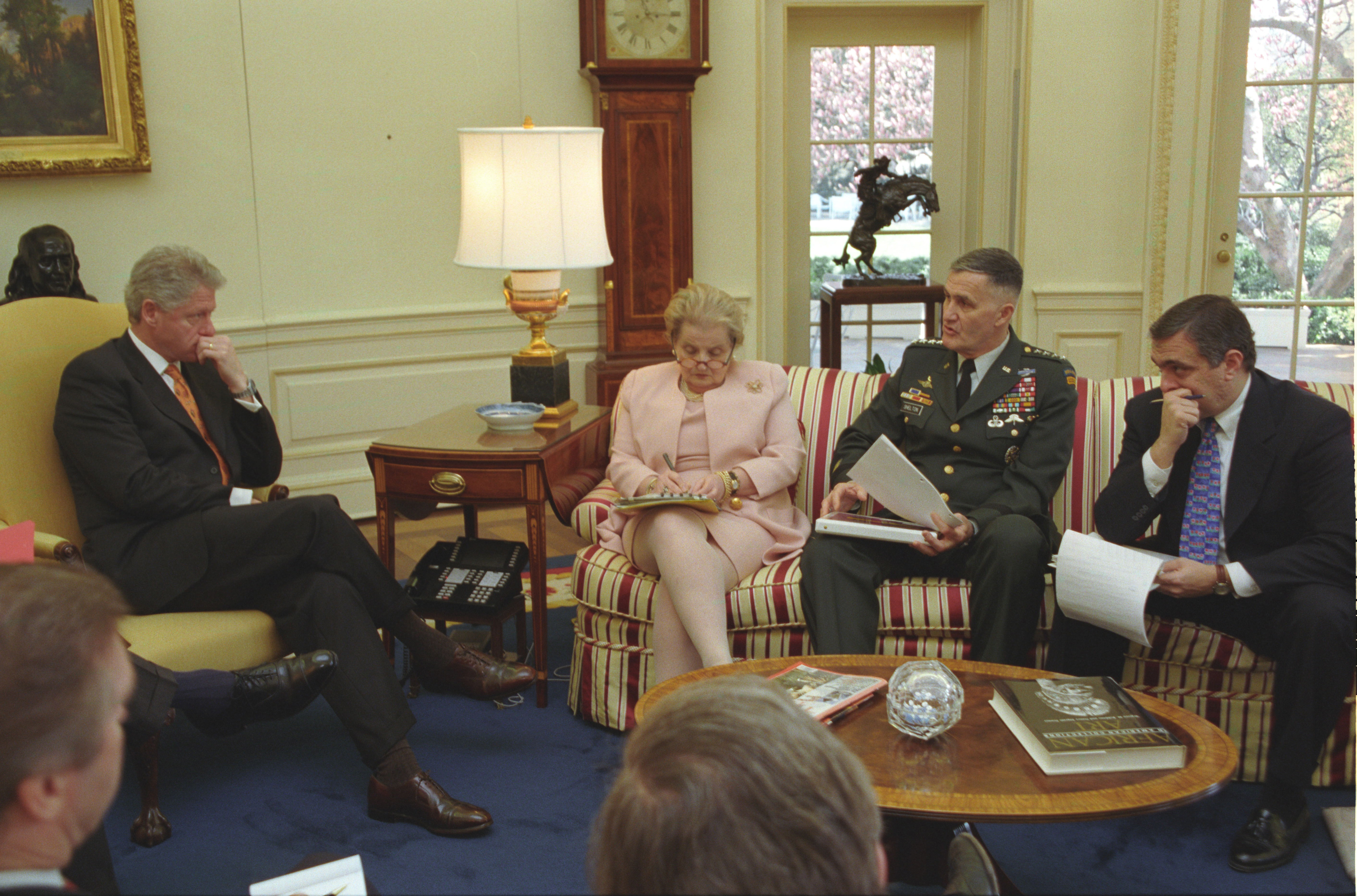
Clinton during a briefing on Kosovo, March 31, 1999

In the midst of a brutal crackdown on ethnic Albanian separatists in the province of Kosovo by the Federal Republic of Yugoslavia, Clinton authorized the use of U.S. Armed Forces in a NATO bombing campaign against Yugoslavia in 1999, named Operation Allied Force. The stated reasoning behind the intervention was to stop the ethnic cleansing (and what the Clinton administration labeled genocide) of Albanians by Yugoslav anti-guerilla military units. General Wesley Clark was Supreme Allied Commander of NATO and oversaw the mission. With United Nations Security Council Resolution 1244, the bombing campaign ended on June 10, 1999. The resolution placed Kosovo under UN administration and authorized a peacekeeping force to be deployed to the region. NATO announced its soldiers all survived combat, though two died in an Apache helicopter crash. Journalists in the popular press criticized genocide statements by the Clinton administration as false and greatly exaggerated. Prior to the bombing campaign on March 24, 1999, estimates showed that the number of civilians killed in the over year long conflict in Kosovo had been approximately 1,800, with critics asserting that little or no evidence existed of genocide. In a post-war inquiry, the Organization for Security and Co-operation in Europe noted "the patterns of the expulsions and the vast increase in lootings, killings, rape, kidnappings and pillage once the NATO air war began on March 24." In 2001, the UN-supervised Supreme Court of Kosovo ruled that genocide (the intent to destroy a people) did not take place, but recognized "a systematic campaign of terror, including murders, rapes, arsons and severe maltreatments" with the intention being the forceful departure of the Albanian population. The term "ethnic cleansing" was used as an alternative to "genocide" to denote not just ethnically motivated murder but also displacement, though critics charge there is little difference. Slobodan Milošević, the president of Yugoslavia at the time of the atrocities, was eventually brought to trial before the International Criminal Tribunal for the former Yugoslavia in the Hague on charges including crimes against humanity and war crimes for his role in the war. He died in 2006, before the completion of the trial.

==== China ====
Clinton aimed to increase trade with China, minimizing import tariffs and offering the country most favoured nation status in 1993, his administration minimized tariff levels in Chinese imports. Clinton initially conditioned extension of this status on human rights reforms, but ultimately decided to extend the status despite a lack of reform in the specified areas, including free emigration, treatment of prisoners in terms of international human rights, and observation of human rights specified by UN resolutions, among others.

Relations were damaged briefly by the American bombing of the Chinese embassy in Belgrade in May 1999. Clinton apologized for the bombing, stating it was accidental.

Israeli prime minister Ehud Barak, President Clinton and Palestinian leader Yasser Arafat at Camp David, July 2000

On October 10, 2000, Clinton signed into law the United States–China Relations Act of 2000, which granted permanent normal trade relations (PNTR) trade status to China. The president asserted that free trade would gradually open China to democratic reform.

In encouraging Congress to approve the agreement and China's accession to the World Trade Organization (WTO), Clinton stated that more trade with China would advance America's economic interests, saying that "economically, this agreement is the equivalent of a one-way street. It requires China to open its markets—with a fifth of the world's population, potentially the biggest markets in the world—to both our products and services in unprecedented new ways."

==== Israeli-Palestinian conflict ====
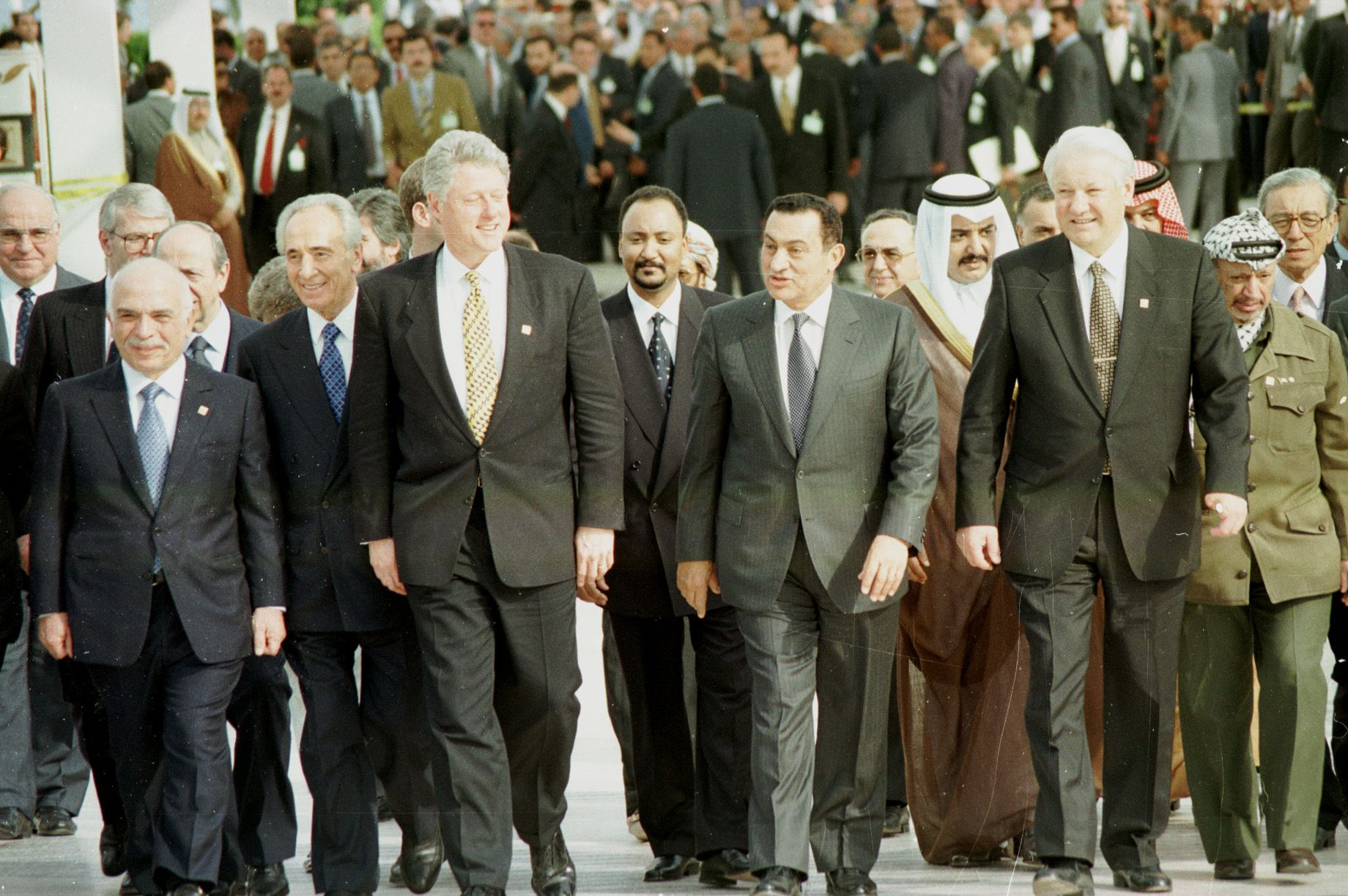
World Leaders attending the Sharm El Sheikh Summit for Peacemakers. From left: Helmut Kohl, King Husein, Shimon Peres, Clinton, Hosni Mubarak, Boris Yeltsin and Yasser Arafat in Sharm El Sheikh, March 1996

Clinton attempted to end the Israeli–Palestinian conflict. Secret negotiations mediated by Clinton between Israeli Prime Minister Yitzhak Rabin and Palestine Liberation Organization (PLO) Chairman Yasser Arafat led to a historic declaration of peace in September 1993, called the Oslo Accords, which were signed at the White House on September 13. The agreement led to the Israel–Jordan peace treaty in 1994 and the Wye River Memorandum in October 1998, however, this did not end the conflict. He brought Israeli prime minister Ehud Barak and Palestinian Authority chairman Yasser Arafat together at Camp David for the 2000 Camp David Summit, which lasted 14 days in July. Following another attempt in December 2000 at Bolling Air Force Base, in which the president offered the Clinton Parameters, the situation broke down completely after the end of the Taba Summit and with the start of the Second Intifada.

=== Judicial appointments ===
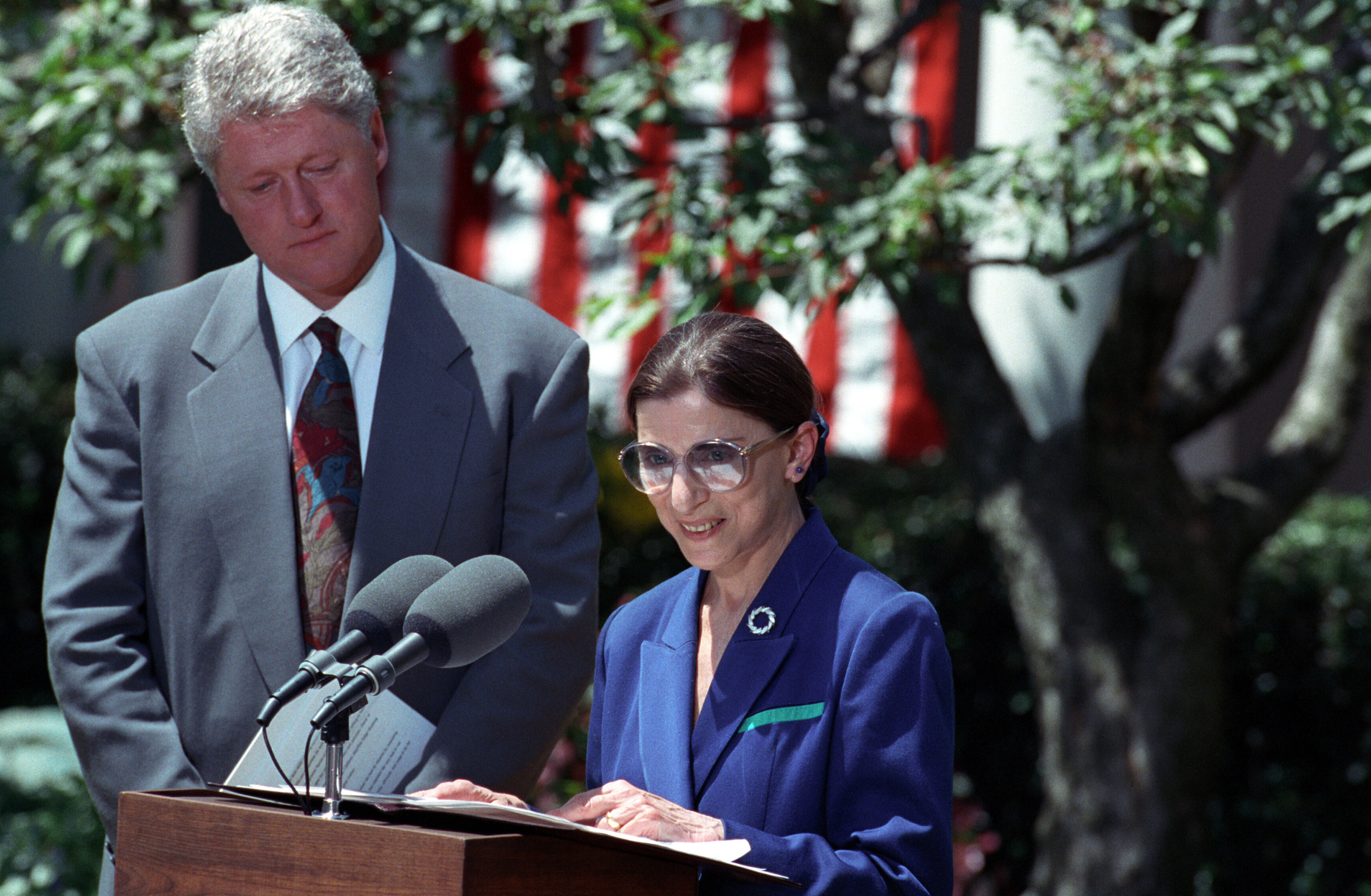
Ruth Bader Ginsburg accepting her nomination to the Supreme Court from President Clinton, 1993

Clinton appointed two justices to the Supreme Court: Ruth Bader Ginsburg in 1993 and Stephen Breyer in 1994. Both justices went on to serve until the 2020s, leaving a lasting judicial legacy for President Clinton.

Clinton was the first president in history to appoint more women and minority judges than white male judges to the federal courts. In his eight years in office, 11.6% of Clinton's court of appeals nominees and 17.4% of his district court nominees were black; 32.8% of his court of appeals nominees and 28.5% of his district court nominees were women.

== Public opinion ==
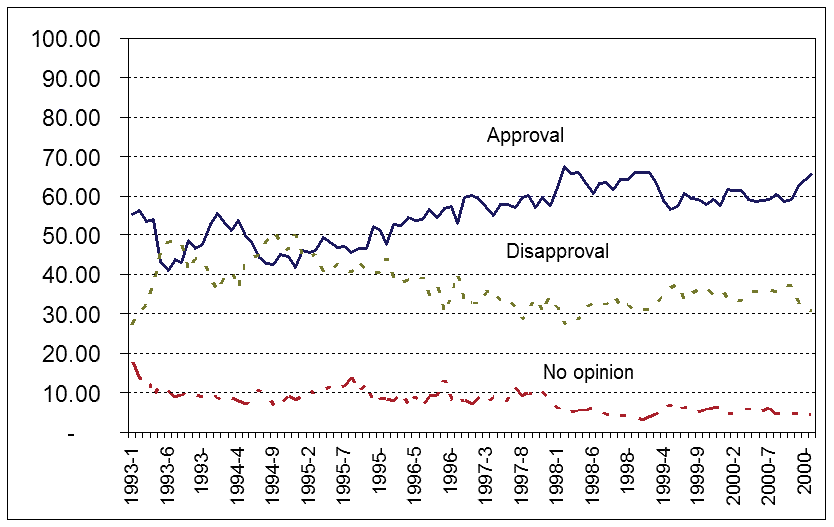
Clinton's approval ratings throughout his presidential career (Roper Center)

Throughout Clinton's first term, his job approval rating fluctuated in the 40s and 50s. In his second term, his rating consistently ranged from the high-50s to the high-60s. After his impeachment proceedings in 1998 and 1999, Clinton's rating reached its highest point. According to a CBS News/New York Times poll, Clinton left office with an approval rating of 68 percent, which matched those of Ronald Reagan and Franklin D. Roosevelt as the highest ratings for departing presidents in the modern era. Clinton's average Gallup poll approval rating for his last quarter in office was 61 percent, the highest final quarter rating any president has received for fifty years. Forty-seven percent of the respondents identified themselves as being Clinton supporters.

As he was leaving office, a CNN/USA Today/Gallup poll revealed that 45 percent of Americans said they would miss him; 55 percent thought he "would have something worthwhile to contribute and should remain active in public life"; 68 percent thought he would be remembered more for his "involvement in personal scandal" than for "his accomplishments"; and 58 percent answered "No" to the question "Do you generally think Bill Clinton is honest and trustworthy?" The same percentage said he would be remembered as either "outstanding" or "above average" as a president, while 22 percent said he would be remembered as "below average" or "poor". ABC News characterized public consensus on Clinton as, "You can't trust him, he's got weak morals and ethics—and he's done a heck of a good job." During his first term, roughly 7 in 10 Americans believed that the media unfairly covered Clinton's character flaws, according to polling.

A year after he left office, a Gallup poll found that 51 percent of respondents said they approved of the overall job Clinton did as president. In May 2006, a CNN poll comparing Clinton's job performance with that of his successor, George W. Bush, found that a strong majority of respondents said Clinton outperformed Bush in six different areas questioned. A June 2006 poll by Gallup found that 61 percent of Americans said they approved of the job Clinton did as president, a 10-point increase from the 2002 poll. Gallup polls in 2007 and 2011 showed that Clinton was regarded by 13 percent of Americans as the greatest president in U.S. history.

In 2010, 69 percent of respondents in a Gallup survey said they approved of the job Clinton did as president, including 47 percent of Republicans and 68 percent of independents. His sudden spike in popularity during this time was attributed to Americans comparing him to then-incumbent Democratic president Barack Obama, who had low approval ratings. In 2014, 18 percent of respondents in a Quinnipiac University Polling Institute poll of American voters regarded Clinton as the best president since World War II, making him the third most popular among postwar presidents, behind John F. Kennedy and Ronald Reagan. The same poll showed that just 3 percent of American voters regarded Clinton as the worst president since World War II.

A 2015 poll by The Washington Post asked 162 scholars of the American Political Science Association to rank all the U.S. presidents in order of greatness. According to their findings, Clinton ranked eighth overall, with a rating of 70 percent.

== Public image ==
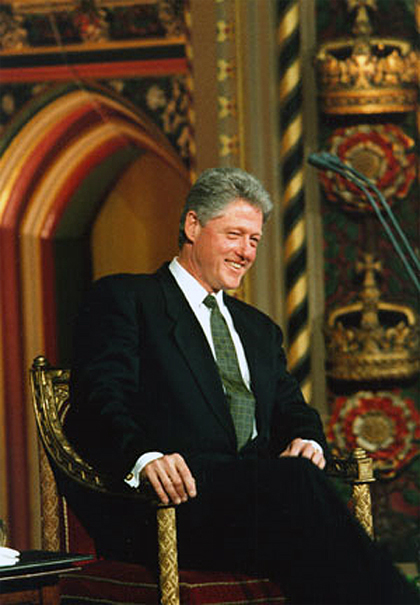
Clinton addressing the British Parliament on November 29, 1995

Clinton was the first baby boomer president. Authors Martin Walker and Bob Woodward stated that Clinton's innovative use of sound bite-ready dialogue, personal charisma, and public perception-oriented campaigning were a major factor in his high public approval ratings. When Clinton played the saxophone on The Arsenio Hall Show, he was described by some religious conservatives as "the MTV president". Opponents sometimes referred to him as "Slick Willie", a nickname which was first applied to him in 1980 by Pine Bluff Commercial journalist Paul Greenberg; Greenberg believed that Clinton was abandoning the progressive policies of previous Arkansas governors such as Winthrop Rockefeller, Dale Bumpers and David Pryor. The claim "Slick Willie" would last throughout his presidency. His folksy manner led him to be nicknamed Bubba starting from the 1992 presidential election. Since 2000, he has frequently been referred to as "The Big Dog" or "Big Dog". His prominent role in campaigning for Obama during the 2012 presidential election and his widely publicized speech at the 2012 Democratic National Convention, where he officially nominated Obama and criticized Republican nominee Mitt Romney and Republican policies in detail, earned him the nickname "Explainer-in-Chief".

Clinton drew strong support from the African American community and insisted that the improvement of race relations would be a major theme of his presidency. In 1998, Nobel laureate Toni Morrison called Clinton "the first black president", saying, "Clinton displays almost every trope of blackness: single-parent household, born poor, working-class, saxophone-playing, McDonald's-and-junk-food-loving boy from Arkansas". Morrison noted that Clinton's sex life was scrutinized more than his career accomplishments, and she compared this to the stereotyping and double standards that, she said, black people typically endure. Many viewed this comparison as unfair and disparaging both to Clinton and to the African-American community.

=== Sexual assault and misconduct allegations ===
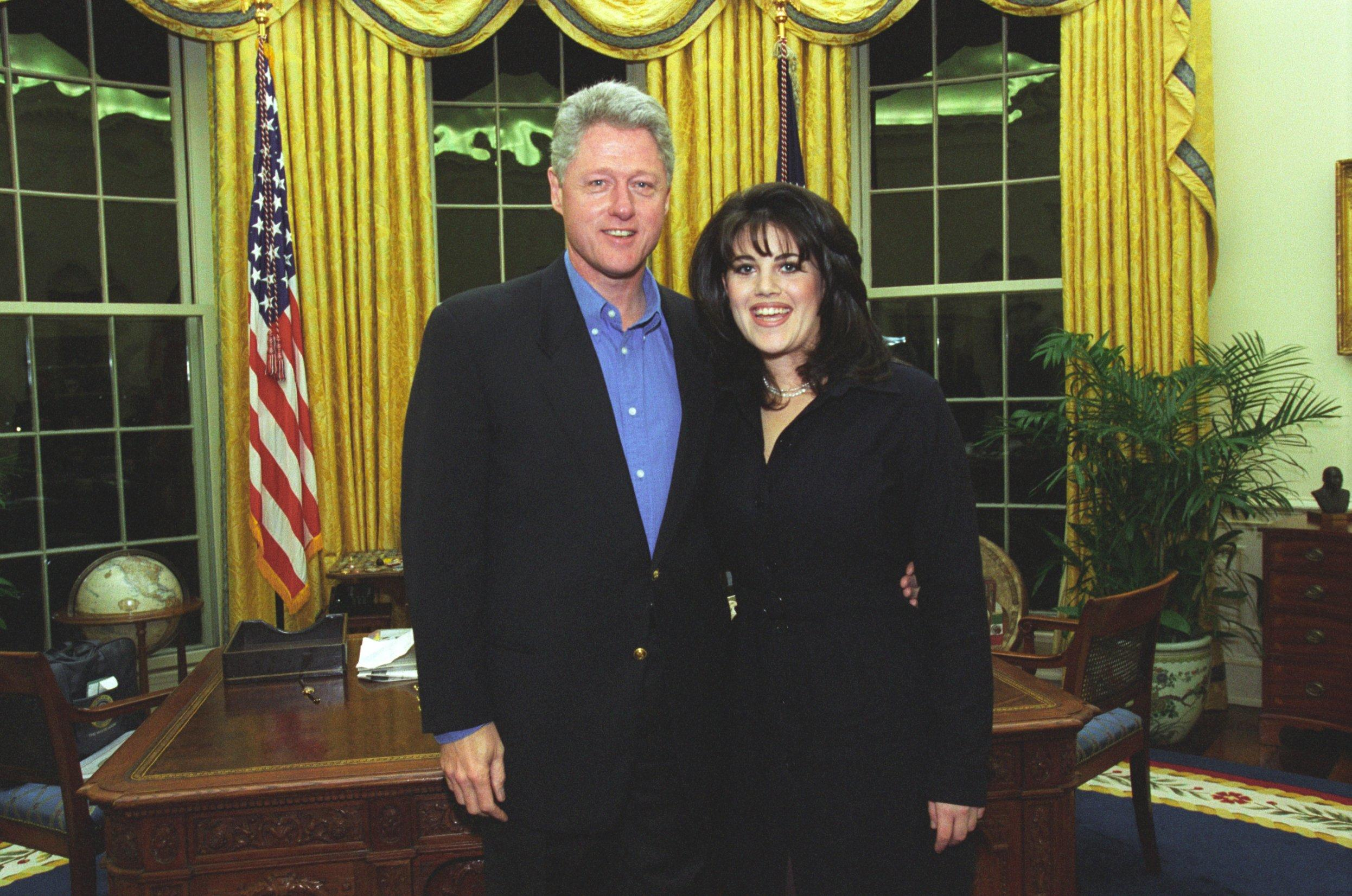
Clinton and Monica Lewinsky on February 28, 1997

Several women have publicly accused Clinton of sexual misconduct, including rape, harassment, and sexual assault. Additionally, some commentators have characterized Clinton's sexual relationship with former White House intern Monica Lewinsky as predatory or non-consensual, despite the fact that Lewinsky called the relationship consensual at the time. These allegations have been revisited and lent more credence in 2018, in light of the #MeToo movement, with many commentators and Democratic leaders now saying Clinton should have been compelled to resign after the Lewinsky affair.

In 1994, Paula Jones initiated a sexual harassment lawsuit against Clinton, claiming he had made unwanted advances towards her in 1991; Clinton denied the allegations. In April 1998, the case was initially dismissed by Judge Susan Webber Wright on the grounds that it lacked legal merit. Jones appealed Webber Wright's ruling, and her suit gained traction following Clinton's admission to having an affair with Monica Lewinsky in August 1998. In 1998, lawyers for Paula Jones released court documents that alleged a pattern of sexual harassment by Clinton when he was Governor of Arkansas. Robert S. Bennett, Clinton's main lawyer for the case, called the filing "a pack of lies" and "an organized campaign to smear the President of the United States" funded by Clinton's political enemies. In October 1998, Clinton's attorneys tentatively offered $700,000 to settle the case, which was then the $800,000 which Jones' lawyers sought. Clinton later agreed to an out-of-court settlement and paid Jones $850,000. Bennett said the president made the settlement only so he could end the lawsuit for good and move on with his life. During the deposition for the Jones lawsuit, which was held at the White House, Clinton denied having sexual relations with Monica Lewinsky—a denial that became the basis for an impeachment charge of perjury.

In 1998, Kathleen Willey alleged that Clinton had groped her in a hallway in 1993. An independent counsel determined Willey gave "false information" to the FBI, inconsistent with sworn testimony related to the Jones allegation. On March 19, 1998, Julie Hiatt Steele, a friend of Willey, released an affidavit, accusing the former White House aide of asking her to lie to corroborate Ms. Willey's account of being sexually groped by Clinton in the Oval Office. An attempt by Kenneth Starr to prosecute Steele for making false statements and obstructing justice ended in a mistrial and Starr declined to seek a retrial after Steele sought an investigation against the former independent counsel for prosecutorial misconduct.

Also in 1998, Juanita Broaddrick alleged that Clinton had raped her in the spring of 1978, although she said she did not remember the exact date. To support her charge, Broaddrick notes that she told multiple witnesses in 1978 she had been raped by Clinton, something these witnesses also state in interviews to the press. Broaddrick had earlier filed an affidavit denying any "unwelcome sexual advances" and later repeated the denial in a sworn deposition. In a 1998 NBC interview wherein she detailed the alleged rape, Broaddrick said she had denied (under oath) being raped only to avoid testifying about the ordeal publicly.

The Lewinsky scandal has had an enduring impact on Clinton's legacy, beyond his impeachment in 1998. In the wake of the #MeToo movement (which shed light on the widespread prevalence of sexual assault and harassment, especially in the workplace), various commentators and Democratic political leaders, as well as Lewinsky herself, have revisited their view that the Lewinsky affair was consensual, and instead characterized it as an abuse of power or harassment, in light of the power differential between a president and a 22-year-old intern. In 2018, Clinton was asked in several interviews about whether he should have resigned, and he said he had made the right decision in not resigning. During the 2018 congressional elections, The New York Times alleged that having no Democratic candidate for office asking Clinton to campaign with them was a change that attributed to the revised understanding of the Lewinsky scandal. However, former DNC interim chair Donna Brazile previously urged Clinton in November 2017 to campaign during the 2018 midterm elections, in spite of New York U.S. senator Kirsten Gillibrand's recent criticism of the Lewinsky scandal.

=== Relationship with Jeffrey Epstein ===
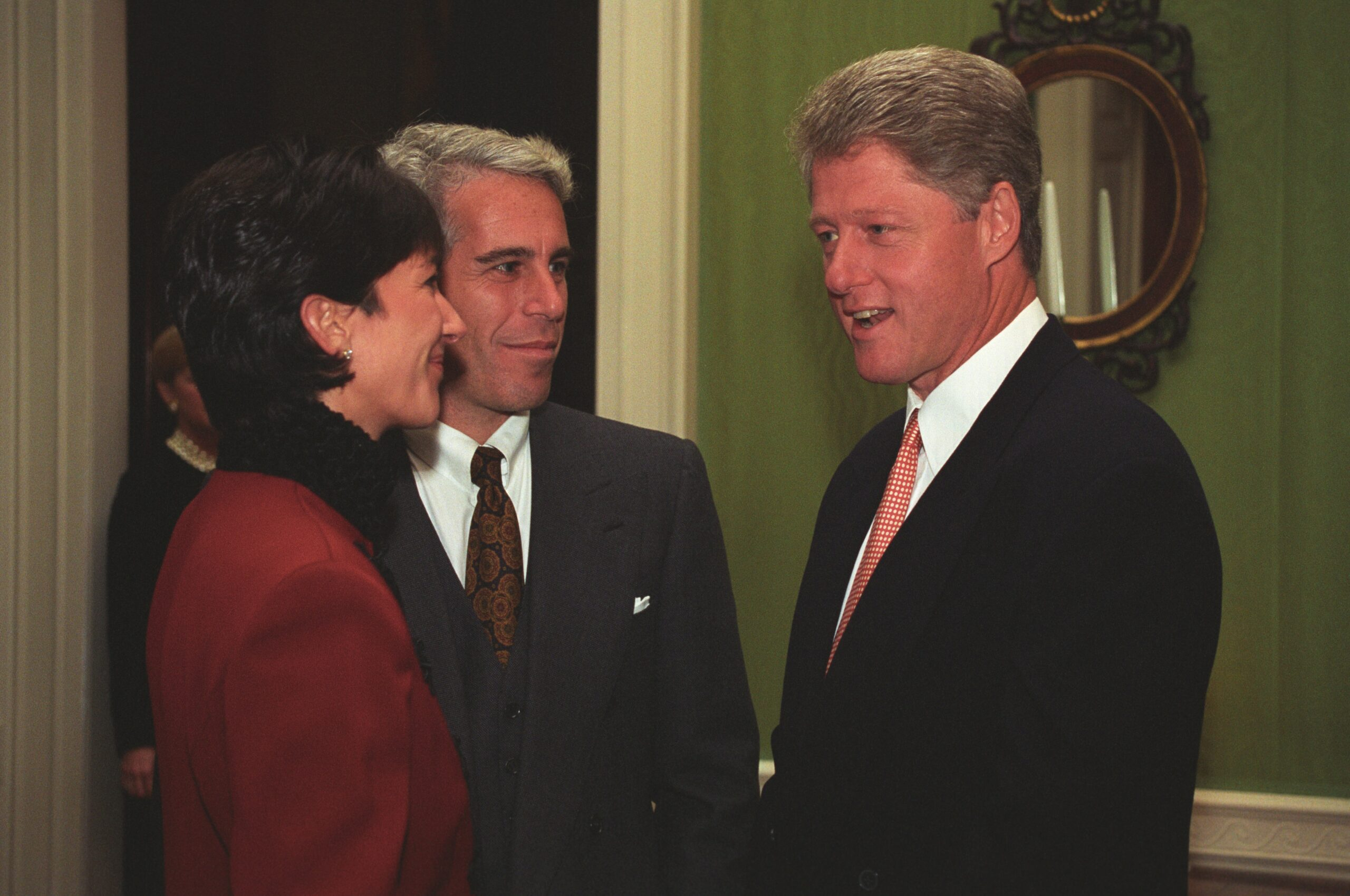
President Clinton hosting Epstein and Maxwell at the White House in 1993

Clinton also had a relationship with the American financier and 2008-convicted child sex offender Jeffrey Epstein from 1993 to 2003 and made flights on Epstein's plane numerous times from 2002 to 2003 for charity trips, and sending him a message in his 2003 birthday greeting album. (Note: Attributed to multiple sources:) However, the details surrounding their relationship have been disputed, with Epstein's former romantic partner Ghislaine Maxwell, who is acknowledged to have visited the White House with Epstein when Clinton was president, being described as the person who was the "glue" of Epstein and Clinton's relationship. (Note: Attributed to multiple sources:)

Virginia Giuffre made controversial allegations that Clinton had visited Epstein's private island. In a 2011 Daily Mail interview, she said that Ghislaine Maxwell "went to pick up Bill in a huge black helicopter that Jeffrey had bought her", and that "Bill had the Secret Service with him and I remember him talking about what a good job she did". In a 2011 email Epstein sent, he wrote: "[T]hese stories are complete an[d] utter fantasy, I don't know and have never met Al gore, Clinton was never on the island". Alan Dershowitz argued Giuffre's story was improbable, as the Secret Service would not allow Maxwell, "then a novice helicopter pilot", to fly a former president. A 2017 Freedom of Information Act request found no evidence of Secret Service records to back claims that Clinton visited Epstein's island. Giuffre later walked back claims that she witnessed Maxwell fly Clinton to the island.

=== Alleged affairs ===
Clinton has admitted to having extramarital affairs with singer Gennifer Flowers and Monica Lewinsky. Actress Elizabeth Gracen, Miss Arkansas winner Sally Perdue, and Dolly Kyle Browning all claimed that they had affairs with Clinton during his time as Governor of Arkansas. Browning later sued Clinton, Bruce Lindsey, Robert S. Bennett, and Jane Mayer, alleging they engaged in a conspiracy to attempt to block her from publishing a book loosely based on her relationship with Clinton and tried to defame him. However, Browning's lawsuit was dismissed.

== Post-presidency (2001–present) ==
=== Activities until 2008 campaign ===
In 2002, Clinton warned that pre-emptive military action against Iraq would have unwelcome consequences, and later claimed to have opposed the Iraq War from the start (though some dispute this). In 2005, Clinton criticized the Bush administration for its handling of emissions control, while speaking at the United Nations Climate Change conference in Montreal.

The William J. Clinton Presidential Center and Park in Little Rock, Arkansas, was dedicated in 2004. Clinton released a best-selling autobiography, My Life, in 2004. Clinton's official White House portrait, commissioned by the White House Historical Association, was unveiled in June 2004. It was painted by Simmie Knox. In 2007, he released Giving: How Each of Us Can Change the World, which also became a New York Times Best Seller and garnered positive reviews.

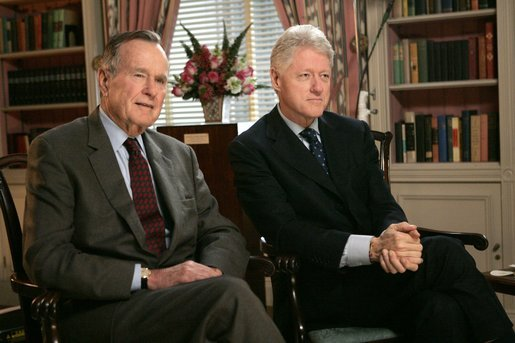
Former presidents George H. W. Bush and Clinton in the White House Library, January 2005

In the aftermath of the 2004 Asian tsunami, U.N. secretary-general Kofi Annan appointed Clinton to head a relief effort. After Hurricane Katrina, Clinton joined with fellow former president George H. W. Bush to establish the Bush-Clinton Tsunami Fund in January 2005, and the Bush-Clinton Katrina Fund in October of that year. As part of the tsunami effort, these two ex-presidents appeared in a Super Bowl XXXIX pre-game show, and traveled to the affected areas. They also spoke together at the funeral of Boris Yeltsin in April 2007.

Based on his philanthropic worldview, Clinton created the William J. Clinton Foundation to address issues of global importance. This foundation includes the Clinton Foundation HIV and AIDS Initiative (CHAI), which strives to combat that disease, and has worked with the Australian government toward that end. The Clinton Global Initiative (CGI), begun by the Clinton Foundation in 2005, attempts to address world problems such as global public health, poverty alleviation and religious and ethnic conflict. In 2005, Clinton announced through his foundation an agreement with manufacturers to stop selling sugary drinks in schools. Clinton's foundation joined with the Large Cities Climate Leadership Group in 2006 to improve cooperation among those cities, and he met with foreign leaders to promote this initiative. The foundation has received donations from many governments all over the world, including Asia and the Middle East. In 2008, Foundation director Inder Singh announced deals to reduce the price of anti-malaria drugs by 30 percent in developing nations. Clinton also spoke in favor of California Proposition 87 on alternative energy, which was voted down.

=== 2008 presidential election ===
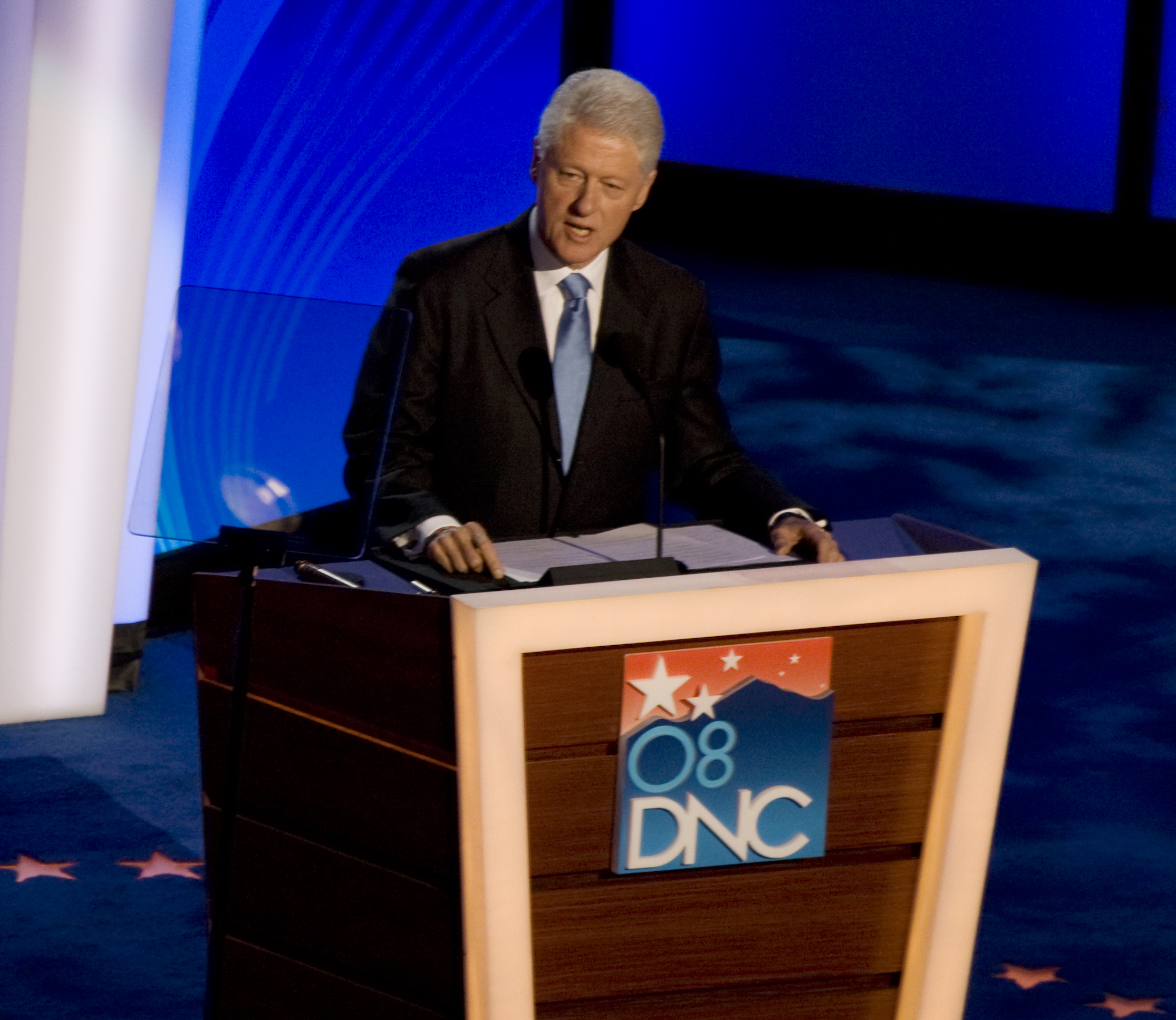
Clinton speaking at the 2008 Democratic National Convention

During the 2008 Democratic presidential primary campaign, Clinton vigorously advocated on behalf of his wife, Hillary. Through speaking engagements and fundraisers, he was able to raise $10 million toward her campaign. Some worried that as an ex-president, he was too active on the trail, too negative to Clinton rival Barack Obama, and alienating his supporters at home and abroad. Many were especially critical of him following his remarks in the South Carolina primary, which Obama won. Later in the 2008 primaries, there was some infighting between Bill and Hillary's staffs, especially in Pennsylvania. Considering Bill's remarks, many thought he could not rally Hillary supporters behind Obama after Obama won the primary. Such remarks led to apprehension that the party would be split to the detriment of Obama's election. Fears were allayed August 27, 2008, when Clinton enthusiastically endorsed Obama at the 2008 Democratic National Convention, saying all his experience as president assures him that Obama is "ready to lead". After Hillary Clinton's presidential campaign was over, Bill Clinton continued to raise funds to help pay off her campaign debt.

=== After the 2008 election ===
In 2009, Clinton travelled to North Korea on behalf of two American journalists imprisoned there. Euna Lee and Laura Ling had been imprisoned for illegally entering the country from China. Jimmy Carter had made a similar visit in 1994. After Clinton met with North Korean leader Kim Jong-il, Kim issued a pardon.

Since then, Clinton has been assigned many other diplomatic missions. He was named United Nations Special Envoy to Haiti in 2009 following a series of hurricanes which caused $1 billion in damages. Clinton organized a conference with the Inter-American Development Bank, where a new industrial park was discussed in an effort to "build back better". In response to the 2010 Haiti earthquake, U.S. president Barack Obama announced that Clinton and George W. Bush would coordinate efforts to raise funds for Haiti's recovery. Funds began pouring into Haiti, which led to funding becoming available for Caracol Industrial Park in a part of the country unaffected by the earthquake. While Hillary Clinton was in South Korea, she and Cheryl Mills worked to convince SAE-A, a large apparel subcontractor, to invest in Haiti despite the company's deep concerns about plans to raise the minimum wage. In the summer of 2010, the South Korean company signed a contract at the U.S. State Department, ensuring that the new industrial park would have a key tenant. In 2010, Clinton announced support of, and delivered the keynote address for, the inauguration of NTR, Ireland's first environmental foundation. At the 2012 Democratic National Convention, Clinton gave a widely praised speech nominating Barack Obama.

=== 2016 presidential election and after ===
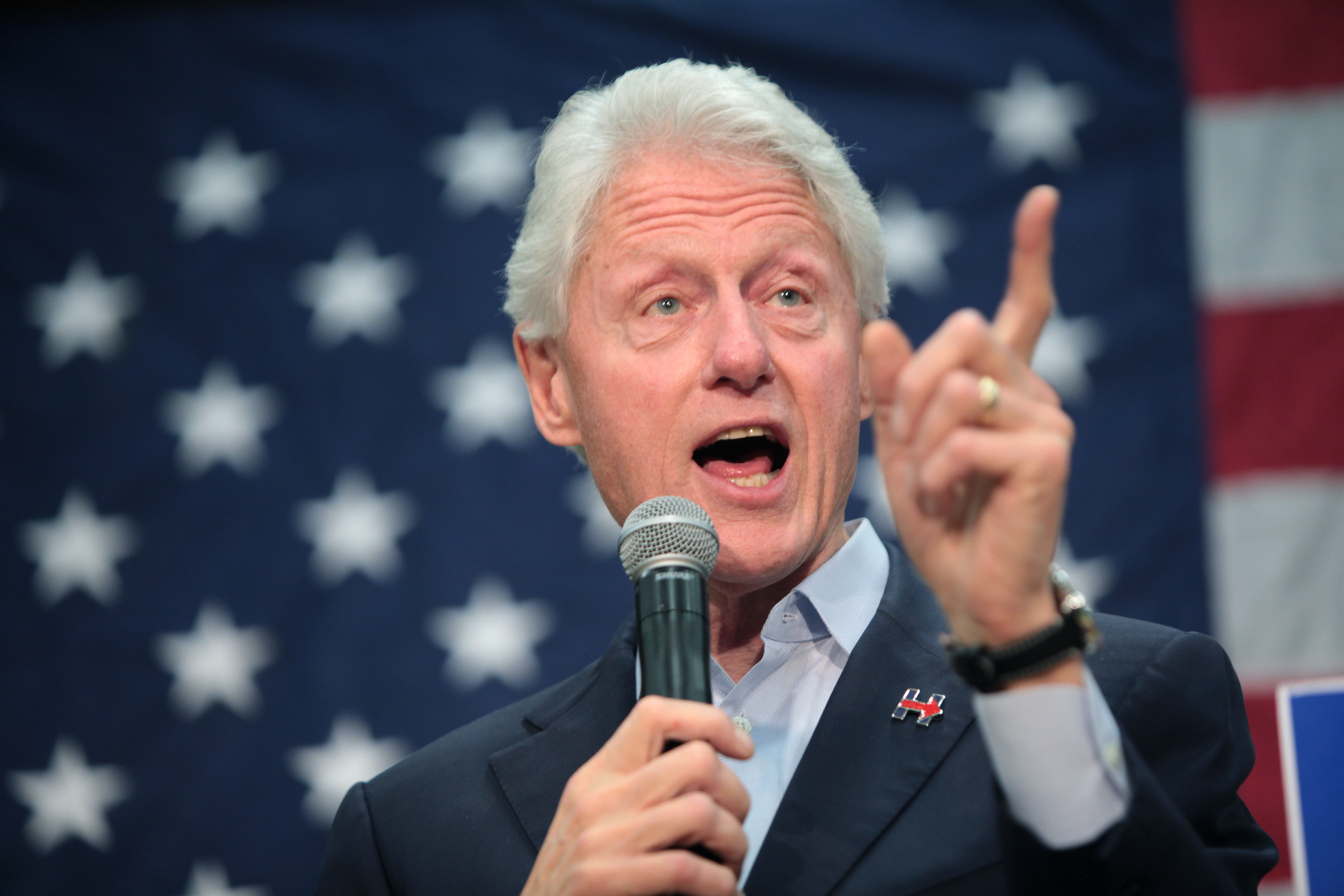
Clinton campaigning at an election rally for his wife Hillary who was running for President of the United States, 2016

During the 2016 presidential election, Clinton again encouraged voters to support Hillary, and made appearances speaking on the campaign trail. In a series of tweets, then-president-elect Donald Trump criticized his ability to get people out to vote. Clinton served as a member of the electoral college for the state of New York. He voted for the Democratic ticket consisting of his wife Hillary and her running-mate Tim Kaine.

On September 7, 2017, Clinton partnered with former presidents Jimmy Carter, George H. W. Bush, George W. Bush, and Barack Obama to work with One America Appeal to help the victims of Hurricane Harvey and Hurricane Irma in the Gulf Coast and Texas communities.

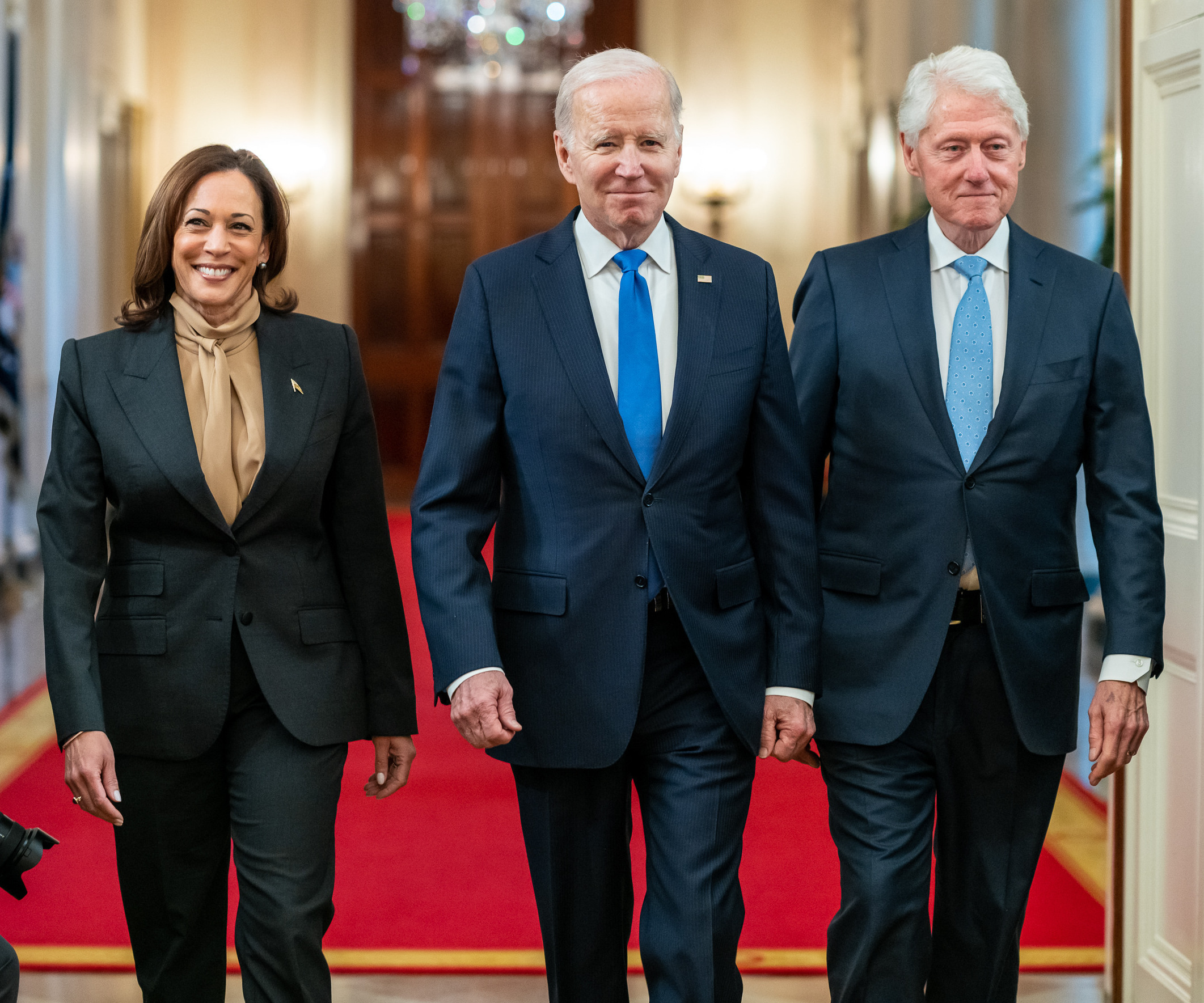
Clinton with Vice President Kamala Harris and President Joe Biden in February 2023

In 2020, Clinton again served as a member of the United States Electoral College from New York, casting his vote for the successful Democratic ticket of Joe Biden and Kamala Harris.

Clinton was one of the first public figures to endorse Biden's re-election campaign in 2024, with him appearing in interviews and fundraisers with various politicians and national figures. He was also one of the most notable politicians to defend Biden after his critically maligned first presidential debate on June 27, with him stating that "bad debate nights happen" and continued to press support for him despite increasing demand from the public and Democratic party requesting for him to drop out. After Biden withdrew his candidacy and vice president Harris replaced him on the ticket, both Bill and Hillary Clinton endorsed her and praised Biden for his work in public service. Clinton later gave a critically acclaimed speech at the 2024 DNC, where he emphasized the Democratic Party's record on job creation and Harris' career achievements as a prosecutor, senator, and vice president.

He later stumped for Harris at various battleground states, where he met with supporters in small towns and at campaign stops. At a stop in Michigan, Clinton caused a backlash by criticizing Arab and Muslim Americans hesitant to support Harris due to her pro-Israeli position, stating Israel had been "forced" to kill civilians during its war in Gaza. His comments led the Institute for Middle East Understanding to state, "Bill Clinton's racist and ahistorical remarks were meant to justify the ethnic cleansing of Palestinians from their land. The Harris campaign is doing itself no favors attaching itself to that kind of hateful rhetoric". He expanded on his comments in an interview with CNN shortly after, stating that he was trying to appeal to both sides of the issue and highlighted his work with Arafat and Rabin in the Oslo Accords, although his response still received sharp condemnation from Muslim, Arab, and Palestinian-Americans.

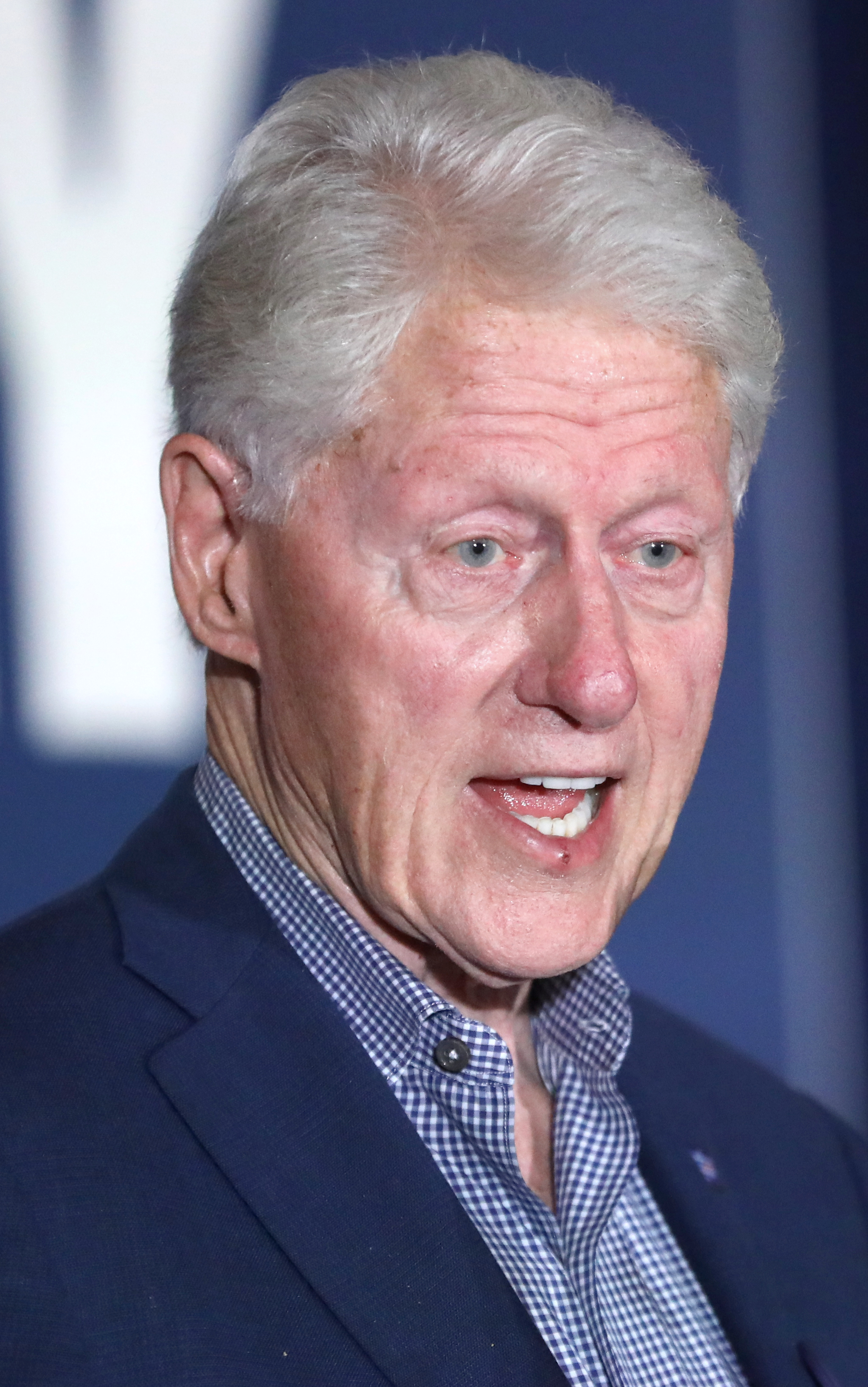
Clinton in October 2024

After Harris lost the general election to Trump, Clinton's remarks were brought up by critics and pundits, who stated that they were the reason why Harris lost support among Arab-American voters and why she fared poorly in the Muslim-populated cities of Dearborn and Hamtramck when compared to previous Democratic candidates. Critics also questioned his relevance to the modern Democratic Party, with pundits stating that his centrist policies and promotion of candidates who align with his views no longer work with a party that has tried to rebrand itself after losing support amongst progressive and populist supporters. After the election, he and Hillary released a statement congratulating president-elect Trump and vice president-elect JD Vance, while stating that Harris and her running-mate Tim Walz ran a "positive, forward-looking campaign to be proud of".

Clinton's second volume of memoirs, Citizen: My Life After the White House, was published in November 2024.

On November 20, 2025, Clinton returned to Little Rock, Arkansas to attend an event celebrating the 75th anniversary of the Arkansas Governor's Mansion, with Arkansas Governor Sarah Huckabee Sanders and other former governors, including U.S. ambassador Mike Huckabee and Asa Hutchinson, in attendance. The next day, Bill and Hillary visited Rev. Jesse Jackson at the Northwestern Memorial Hospital in Chicago.

=== Wealth ===
The Clintons incurred several million dollars in legal bills during his presidency, which were paid off four years after he left office. Bill and Hillary Clinton have each earned millions of dollars from book publishing. In 2016, Forbes reported Bill and Hillary Clinton made about $240 million in the 15 years from January 2001, to December 2015, (mostly from paid speeches, business consulting and book-writing). Also in 2016, CNN reported the Clintons combined to receive more than $153 million in paid speeches from 2001 until spring 2015. In May 2015, The Hill reported that Bill and Hillary Clinton have made more than $25 million in speaking fees since the start of 2014, and that Hillary Clinton also made $5 million or more from her book, Hard Choices, during the same time period. In July 2014, The Wall Street Journal reported that at the end of 2012, the Clintons were worth between $5 million and $25.5 million, and that in 2012 (the last year they were required to disclose the information) the Clintons made between $16 and $17 million, mostly from speaking fees earned by the former president. Clinton earned more than $104 million from paid speeches between 2001 and 2012. In June 2014, ABC News and The Washington Post reported that Bill Clinton has made more than $100 million giving paid speeches since leaving public office, and in 2008, The New York Times reported that the Clintons' income tax returns show they made $109 million in the eight years from January 1, 2000, to December 31, 2007, including almost $92 million from his speaking and book-writing. (Note: Attributed to multiple sources:)

Clinton has given dozens of paid speeches each year since leaving office in 2001, mostly to corporations and philanthropic groups in North America and Europe; he often earned $100,000 to $300,000 per speech. (Note: Attributed to multiple sources:) A Russian investment bank with ties to the Kremlin paid Clinton $500,000 for a speech in Moscow. Hillary Clinton said she and Bill came out of the White House financially "broke" and in debt, especially due to large legal fees incurred during their years in the White House. "We had no money when we got there, and we struggled to, you know, piece together the resources for mortgages, for houses, for Chelsea's education". She added, "Bill has worked really hard ... we had to pay off all our debts ... he had to make double the money because of, obviously, taxes; and then pay off the debts, and get us houses, and take care of family members".

== Personal life ==
At the age of 10, he was baptized at Park Place Baptist Church in Hot Springs, Arkansas. When he became president in 1993, he became a member of Foundry United Methodist Church in Washington, D.C. with his wife, a Methodist.

On October 11, 1975, in Fayetteville, Arkansas, he married Hillary Rodham, whom he met while studying at Yale University. They had Chelsea Clinton, their only child, on February 27, 1980. He is the maternal grandfather to Chelsea's three children.

=== Health ===
In September 2004, Clinton underwent quadruple bypass surgery. In March 2005, he again underwent surgery, this time for a partially collapsed lung. On February 11, 2010, he was rushed to New York-Presbyterian/Columbia Hospital in Manhattan after complaining of chest pains, and he had two coronary stents implanted in his heart. After this procedure, Clinton adopted a plant-based whole foods (vegan) diet, which had been recommended by doctors Dean Ornish and Caldwell Esselstyn. He has since incorporated fish and lean animal flesh at the suggestion of Mark Hyman, a proponent of the pseudoscientific ethos of functional medicine. As a result, he is no longer strictly on a plant-based diet. In 2010 Clinton lost 20 pounds for his daughter Chelsea's wedding.

In October 2021, Clinton was treated for sepsis at the University of California, Irvine Medical Center. (Note: Attributed to multiple sources:) In December 2022, Clinton tested positive for COVID-19. In December 2024, Clinton was hospitalized after developing a fever at the MedStar Georgetown University Hospital in Washington D.C. In August 2025, he was seen with a portable defibrillator.

== Accolades ==
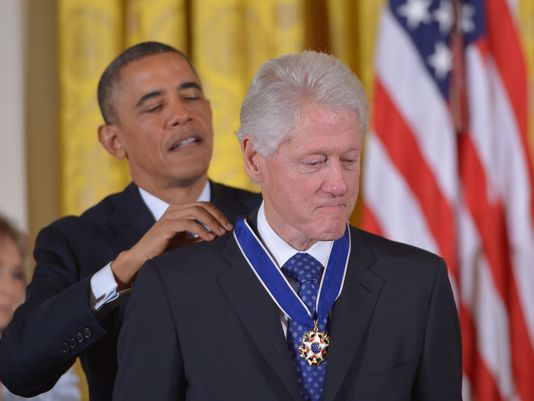
Clinton receiving the Presidential Medal of Freedom from Barack Obama, 2013

Several colleges and universities have awarded Clinton honorary degrees. (Note: Attributed to multiple sources:) He is an honorary fellow of University College, Oxford, which he attended as a Rhodes Scholar, although he did not complete his studies there. Schools have been named for Clinton, and statues have been built of him. He was presented with the Medal for Distinguished Public Service in 2001. The Clinton Presidential Center was opened in Little Rock, Arkansas, in 2001.

The Republic of Kosovo, in gratitude for his help during the Kosovo War, renamed a major street in the capital city of Pristina as Bill Clinton Boulevard and added a Clinton statue. In 2011, Haitian president Michel Martelly awarded Clinton with the National Order of Honour and Merit to the rank of Grand Cross "for his various initiatives in Haiti and especially his high contribution to the reconstruction of the country after the earthquake of January 12, 2010".

Clinton was selected as Time's "Man of the Year" in 1992, and again in 1998, along with Ken Starr. From a poll conducted of the American people in December 1999, Clinton was among eighteen included in Gallup's List of Most Widely Admired People of the 20th Century. In 2001, Clinton received the NAACP President's Award. He has also been honored with a J. William Fulbright Prize for International Understanding, a TED Prize, and was named as an Honorary GLAAD Media Award recipient for his work as an advocate for the LGBT community.

Clinton, along with Mikhail Gorbachev and Sophia Loren, received the 2003 Grammy Award for Best Spoken Word Album for Children for Wolf Tracks and Peter and the Wolf. The audiobook edition of his autobiography, My Life, read by Clinton himself, won the 2005 Grammy Award for Best Spoken Word Album, as well as the Audie Award as the Audiobook of the Year. Clinton has two more Grammy nominations for his audiobooks: Giving: How Each of Us Can Change the World in 2007 and Back to Work in 2012.

President Obama awarded Clinton the Presidential Medal of Freedom on November 20, 2013.

== See also ==
- Clinton family
- Clinton School of Public Service
- Efforts to impeach Bill Clinton
- Electoral history of Bill Clinton
- Gun control policy of the Clinton Administration
- List of presidents of the United States
- List of presidents of the United States by previous experience
- List of United States Democratic Party presidential tickets

Legal offices
Preceded by Jim Guy Tucker	Attorney General of Arkansas; 1977–1979	Succeeded by Steve Clark
Party political offices
Preceded by David Pryor	Democratic nominee for Governor of Arkansas; 1978, 1980, 1982, 1984, 1986, 1990	Succeeded by Jim Guy Tucker
Preceded by Max Baucus, Joe Biden, David L. Boren, Barbara Boxer, Robert Byrd, Dante Fascell, Bill Gray, Tom Harkin, Dee Huddleston, Carl Levin, Tip O'Neill, Claiborne Pell	Response to the State of the Union address 1985; Served alongside: Bob Graham, Tip O'Neill	Succeeded by Tom Daschle, Bill Gray, George Mitchell, Chuck Robb, Harriett Woods
Preceded by Michael Dukakis	Chair of the Democratic Governors Association; 1987–1988	Succeeded by James Blanchard
Preceded by Sam Nunn	Chair of the Democratic Leadership Council; 1990–1991	Succeeded by John Breaux
Preceded by Michael Dukakis	Democratic nominee for President of the United States; 1992, 1996	Succeeded by Al Gore
Political offices
Preceded by Joe Purcell; Acting	Governor of Arkansas; 1979–1981	Succeeded by Frank D. White
Preceded by Frank D. White	Governor of Arkansas; 1983–1992	Succeeded by Jim Guy Tucker
Preceded by Lamar Alexander	Chair of the National Governors Association; 1986–1987	Succeeded by John H. Sununu
Preceded by George H. W. Bush	President of the United States; 1993–2001	Succeeded by George W. Bush
Diplomatic posts
New office	Chair of the Asia-Pacific Economic Cooperation; 1993	Succeeded by Suharto
Preceded by Jacques Chirac	Chair of the Group of Eight; 1997	Succeeded by Tony Blair
U.S. order of precedence (ceremonial)
Preceded by John Roberts as Chief Justice	Order of precedence of the United States as Former President	Succeeded by George W. Bush as Former President
