= List of people who remarried the same spouse =

This is a list of people who remarried each other, usually after divorcing. To qualify, at least one member of each marital pair must have their own Wikipedia page.

== Noteworthy cases ==
- Cato the Younger and Marcia who divorced so that Marcia could marry another man named Quintus Hortensius and have children by him, but speedily remarried as soon as Hortensius died.
- Roman emperor Elagabalus married Aquilia Severa first as his second wife, then divorced her to marry another woman, but soon divorced his third wife to remarry Aquilia
- Kid McCoy, American prize fighter, who married and divorced ten times, but only from eight women, since three of those marriages were to the same spouse, Julia Woodruff
- Richard Pryor, American comedian and actor, who was twice married and divorced from Flynn Belaine, and twice married to Jennifer Lee
- Joyce Mathews, American actress, who was twice divorced from both Milton Berle and Billy Rose

== List ==
Name	Description	Spouse	1st marriage	1st divorce	2nd marriage	2nd divorce	Notes
David Adkins	American comedian Sinbad	Meredith Fuller	1985	1992	2002		
June Allyson	American actress	Alfred Glenn Maxwell	1963	1965	1966	1970	
Pamela Anderson	American actress	Rick Salomon	2007	2008	2014	2015	Their first marriage was annulled.
Irina Baronova	Russian-born ballerina	German (Jerry) Sevastianov	1936	??	after 1967		
Milton Berle	American actor, entertainer	Joyce Mathews	1941	1947	1949	1950	Mathews later twice married and divorced Billy Rose
Fred Berry	American actor, dancer	Franchesska Berry	1976	1976	1978	1980	Berry had 3 other marriages
Birabongse Bhanudej	Thai Prince, Olympic sailor and Formula 1 racing driver	Ceril Heycock	1938	1949	1983	-	He had 4 other wives between these two marriages
Robert Bolt	English playwright, screenwriter	Sarah Miles	1967	1976	1988	-	After their divorce but before remarrying, they had their only child together (his fourth)
Haydn Bunton Sr.	Australian footballer and cricketer	Lylia Austin	1936	1945	1946		
Richard Burton	Welsh actor	Elizabeth Taylor	1964	1974	1975	1976	Burton had 3 other marriages, Taylor 6 others
Alan Campbell	American actor, screenwriter	see Dorothy Parker					
Art Carney	American actor	Jean Myers	1940	1965	1980	-	He married and divorced another woman in between these marriages
Jack Carter	American comedian	Roxanne Wander	1971	1977	1992	-	
Oleg Cassini	American fashion designer	Gene Tierney	1941	1948	1948	1952	
Roger Clinton Sr.	American businessman	see Virginia Clinton Kelley					
Rosemary Clooney	American singer, actress	José Ferrer	1953	1961	1964	1967	Clooney had 1 other marriage, Ferrer 3 others
Joseph Stephen Crane	American actor, restaurateur	see Lana Turner					
Tyrone Curtis	American basketball player	Kim Harris	1989	1997	2015		
Mitch Daniels	American politician	Cheri Herman	1978	1993	1997		
Rodney Dangerfield	American comedian	Joyce Indig	1949	1962	1963	1970	
Hugh Sykes Davies	British poet, novelist	Fay de Courcy	1947	1962	1982		She was the 3rd and 5th of his 5 wives
Gloria DeHaven	American actress	Richard Fincher	1957	1963	1965	1969	
Colleen Dewhurst	Canadian actress	George C. Scott	1960	1965	1967	1972	
Rachel Donelson	Wife of future United States President	see Andrew Jackson					
Sir Talbot Duckmanton	ABC general manager	Janet Strickland	1979	1981	??		
Eminem	American rapper, actor	Kim Scott	1999	2001	2006	2006	
James T. Farrell	American writer	Dorothy Butler	1931	??	1955	-	They separated again in 1958, but remained married until his death. In between these marriages to Butler, he married and divorced another wife
José Ferrer	American actor	see Rosemary Clooney					
Mel Ferrer	American actor	Frances Gunby Pilchard	1937	1939	1944	1953	These were the first and third of his six marriages
Eugene Fodor	American violinist	Susan Davis	1978	1986	2010	-	He died in 2011, three months after their remarriage.
Friedrich Franz	Hereditary Grand Duke of Mecklenburg-Schwerin	Karin Elisabeth von Schaper	1941	1967	1977	-	
Emma Goldman	Russian-American political activist	Jacob Kershner	1887	1887	1888	1899	She divorced Kershner after discovering on their wedding night that he was impotent; she nevertheless agreed to remarry him
Pancho Gonzales	American tennis player	Madelyn Darrow	1960	1968	1970	1972	He married and divorced 6 times and had 8 children
Elliott Gould	American actor	Jenny Bogart	1973	1975	1978	1979	Gould's earlier marriage was to Barbra Streisand
Carol Grace	American actress, writer	William Saroyan	1943	1949	1951	1952	She later married Walter Matthau
Melanie Griffith	American actress	Don Johnson	1976	1976	1989	1996	
Leland Hayward	American theatrical producer	Inez "Lola" Gibbs	1921	1924	1930	1934	
Leona Helmsley	American businesswoman	Joseph Lubin	?	?	?	?	
Benny Hinn	American evangelist	Suzanne Harthern	1979	2010	2013	-	
Paul Hogan	Australian comedian, actor	Noeline Edwards	1958	1981	1982	1990	After divorcing the first time, they continued to reside under the same roof
Terrence Howard	American actor, singer	Lori McCommas	1989	2003	2005	2007	
Ken Hughes	British film director	Charlotte Epstein	1946	1957	1982	2001	
Andrew Jackson	President of the United States	Rachel Donelson Robards	1791	-	1794	-	They married in 1791, believing her divorce from her first husband Captain Lewis Robards was final. When it was revealed this was not the case, and that their marriage was null and void, they married again in 1794. She died before he became president.
John Jarratt	Australian actor	Rosa Miano	1974	1988	2017	-	He married 2 other women, including Noni Hazlehurst, before returning to Rosa
Don Johnson	American actor	see Melanie Griffith					
Jill Johnston	British-American feminist author	Ingrid Nyeboe	1993	?	2003		
Frida Kahlo	Mexican artist	Diego Rivera	1929	1939	1940	-	
Virginia Clinton Kelley	American nurse, mother of Bill Clinton	Roger Clinton Sr.	1950	1962	1962		
George Kennedy	American film, TV actor	Norma "Rebel" Wurman	1959	1971	1973	1978	
Larry King	American television, radio host	Alene Akins	1961	1963	1967	1972	
Estée Lauder	American cosmetician	Joseph Lauter	1930	1939	1942	-	Joseph Lauter later changed his surname to Lauder
Stan Laurel	English actor	Virginia Rogers	1934	1937	1941	1946	
NeNe Leakes	American television personality	Gregg Leakes	1997	2011	2013	2021	Gregg died in September 2021.
Lotte Lenya	German singer, actress	Kurt Weill	1926	1933	1937	-	
Jerry Lee Lewis	American singer and pianist	Myra Gale Brown	1957		1958	1970	The marriage to Brown, his cousin once removed and the third of his seven wives, took place before his second marriage was finalised, so he married her again to ensure its validity
Alicia Lopez-Harrison de Lardé	Salvadoran-American mental health-care advocate	see John Forbes Nash Jr.					
Marga López	Argentine-Mexican actress	Carlos Amador	1941	?	1961	?	
Sophia Loren	Italian actress	Carlo Ponti	1957	1962	1966	-	As Ponti was still married to his first wife, his marriage to Loren was annulled in 1962. After his divorce, they married a second time
Joyce Mathews	American actress	see Milton Berle and Billy Rose					
Gavin MacLeod	American actor	Patti Kendig	1972	1982	1985	-	
Dame Hilary Mantel	British novelist	Gerald McEwen	1973	1981	1982	-	
Tommy Manville	American socialite						He was married 13 times to 11 women; the record is somewhat confused
Kid McCoy	American pugilist, actor	Julia Woodruff	1897	1900	1901	1902	They married and divorced a third time 1902-?. McCoy was married 10 times to 8 women. Woodruff was his 3rd, 4th and 5th wife.
Carson McCullers	American novelist	Reeves McCullers	1937	1941	1945	-	Reeves committed suicide in 1953, after failing to persuade Carson to join him in a suicide pact. Carson had attempted suicide in 1948.
David Merrick	American entrepreneur	Etan Aronson	??	??	??	??	
Sarah Miles	English actress	see Robert Bolt					
Jan Morris	UK historian, novelist, travel writer	Elizabeth Tuckniss	1949	?	2008		They married when he was a male named James Morris; after his sex change, they divorced; their 2008 reunion was under a civil partnership
Lebohang Morake	South African producer and composer	Angela Ngani-Casara	2009	2013	2016	2017	
Elon Musk	Canadian-American business magnate, engineer	Talulah Riley	2010	2012	2013	2016	They filed for a divorce in 2014 but this application was withdrawn.
John Forbes Nash Jr.	American mathematician	Alicia Lopez-Harrison de Lardé	1957	1963	2001	-	They both died in a car accident in 2015
Ne Win	Burmese politician and military commander	Ni Ni Myint	?	?	?	-	She was the 4th and 6th of his wives
Judy Nugent	American actress	Buck Taylor	1961	1961	1963	1983	
Jennifer O'Neill	American actress	Richard Alan Brown	1986	1989	1993	1996	Brown was her 6th and 8th husband, of her so-far 9 marriages
Marie Osmond	American singer, actress	Steve Craig	1982	1985	2011	-	
Jack Paar	American actor	Irene Paar	?	?	?	?	
Dorothy Parker	American writer, humorist	Alan Campbell	1934	1947	1950	1963	
Carlo Ponti	Italian film producer	see Sophia Loren					
Gladys Portugues	American body builder, actress	see Jean-Claude Van Damme					
Richard Pryor	American comedian, actor	Jennifer Lee	1979	1982	2001	-	
Richard Pryor	American comedian, actor	Flynn Belaine	1986	1987	1990	1991	
Esther Rahim	Pakistani painter	Jalaludin Abdur Rahim	1929	1945	1952	-	
Jalaludin Abdur Rahim	Pakistani politician	see Esther Rahim					
Erich Maria Remarque	German-American novelist	Ilse Jutta Zambona	1925	1930	1938	1957	
Ruth Rendell	British crime novelist	Don Rendell	1950	1975	1977	-	
Diego Rivera	Mexican sculptor	see Frida Kahlo					
Rachel Donelson Robards	Wife of future United States president	see Andrew Jackson					
Billy Rose	American impresario, producer, lyricist	Joyce Mathews	1956	1959	1961	1963	Mathews had earlier twice married and divorced Milton Berle. Rose divorced three other women, including Fanny Brice and Eleanor Holm.
Phil Ruffin	American businessman	Mary Louise Miller	?	?	?	?	
Rick Salomon	American poker player	see Pamela Anderson					
William Saroyan	American playwright, novelist	see Carol Grace					
Hermann Scherchen	German conductor	Auguste Marie (Gustl) Jansen	1921	??	1929	??	Of his 6 marriages, those to Jansen were his first and third.
George C. Scott	American actor	see Colleen Dewhurst					
Jerry Sheindlin	American author	see Judy Sheindlin					
Judy Sheindlin	American TV judge ("Judge Judy")	Jerry Sheindlin	1977	1990	1991	-	
Percy Bysshe Shelley	English poet	Harriet Westbrook	1811	-	1814		They firstly eloped to Scotland, but this marriage was not recognised under English law; the second marriage, in London, rectified this. They separated but never divorced; three weeks after Harriet's suicide in 1816, Shelley married Mary Wollstonecraft Godwin
Dmitri Shostakovich	Soviet composer, pianist	Nina Varzar	1932	1935	? 1936	-	They remarried when it was revealed she was pregnant with his child. They remained married until her death in 1954 but the marriage was open and he had other relationships.
Aleksandr Solzhenitsyn	Russian novelist	Natalia Reshetovskaya	1940	1952	1957	1972	
Jean Starr	American poet	see Louis Untermeyer					
Radek Štěpánek	Czech tennis player	Nicole Vaidišová	2010	2013	2018		
Yma Sumac	Peruvian singer	Moisés Vivanco	1942	1957	1957	1965	
Buck Taylor	American actor	see Judy Nugent					
Dame Elizabeth Taylor	British-American actress	see Richard Burton					
Amanda Thane	Australian operatic soprano	Glenn Winslade	1978	1989	1999	-	Thane died in 2012
Gene Tierney	American actress	see Oleg Cassini					
Lana Turner	American actress	Joseph Stephen Crane	1942	1943	1943	1944	Crane's divorce from his first wife was not final when he married Turner in 1942, so the marriage was annulled. When Turner discovered she was pregnant to him, she remarried him, but they divorced the following year
Louis Untermeyer	American poet, critic	Jean Starr	1906	1926	1929	1930	
Nicole Vaidišová	Czech tennis player	see Radek Štěpánek					
Jean-Claude Van Damme	Belgian martial artist, actor	Gladys Portugues	1987	1992	1999	2015	
Willem van Otterloo	Dutch conductor	Anette Heukers	1941	1943	1944	1954	He was married five times, to four woman. These marriages to Anette Heukers were his second and third marriages.
Moisés Vivanco	Peruvian composer	see Yma Sumac					
Robert Wagner	American actor	Natalie Wood	1957	1962	1972	-	
Barbara Walters	American journalist	Merv Adelson	1981	1984	1986	1992	
Ruth Warrick	American actress	Carl Neubert	1950	1952	1961	1963	
Dionne Warwick	American singer	William Elliott	1966	1967	1967	1975	
Kurt Weill	German-American composer	see Lotte Lenya					
Glenn Winslade	Australian operatic tenor	see Amanda Thane					
Glynn "Scotty" Wolfe	Baptist minister	Charlotte Devane	1935	1936	1936	-	Wolfe's second marriage to Charlotte Devane ended in her death in 1938. Wolfe held the record for the largest number of monogamous marriages; he married 31 times to 29 women. His final wife Linda Taylor held the record for the most-married woman (23 husbands).
Glynn "Scotty" Wolfe	Baptist minister	Katherine Archer	1948	1948	1949	1951	Wolfe's second marriage to Charlotte Devane ended in her death in 1938. Wolfe held the record for the largest number of monogamous marriages; he married 31 times to 29 women. His final wife Linda Taylor held the record for the most-married woman (23 husbands).
Glynn "Scotty" Wolfe	Baptist minister	Sharon Goodwin	1958	1959	1960	??	Wolfe's second marriage to Charlotte Devane ended in her death in 1938. Wolfe held the record for the largest number of monogamous marriages; he married 31 times to 29 women. His final wife Linda Taylor held the record for the most-married woman (23 husbands).
Natalie Wood	American actress	see Robert Wagner					
Christian Wulff	German President (2010–2012)	Bettina Wulff	2008	2013	2015	2020	Third marriage 2023
Jane Wyman	American actress	Fred Karger	1952	1955	1961	1965	
Joker Xue	Chinese singer-songwriter	Leixin Gao	2012	2015	2017	-	These were the first and second marriage for both of them, and their first child was born in 2018.
Peter Yarrow	American singer	Mary Beth McCarthy	1969	??	2022	-	

== See also ==
- Sororate marriage
- Levirate marriage
