= Clinton family =

American political family

Clinton
- Political family
- Coat of arms of President Bill Clinton

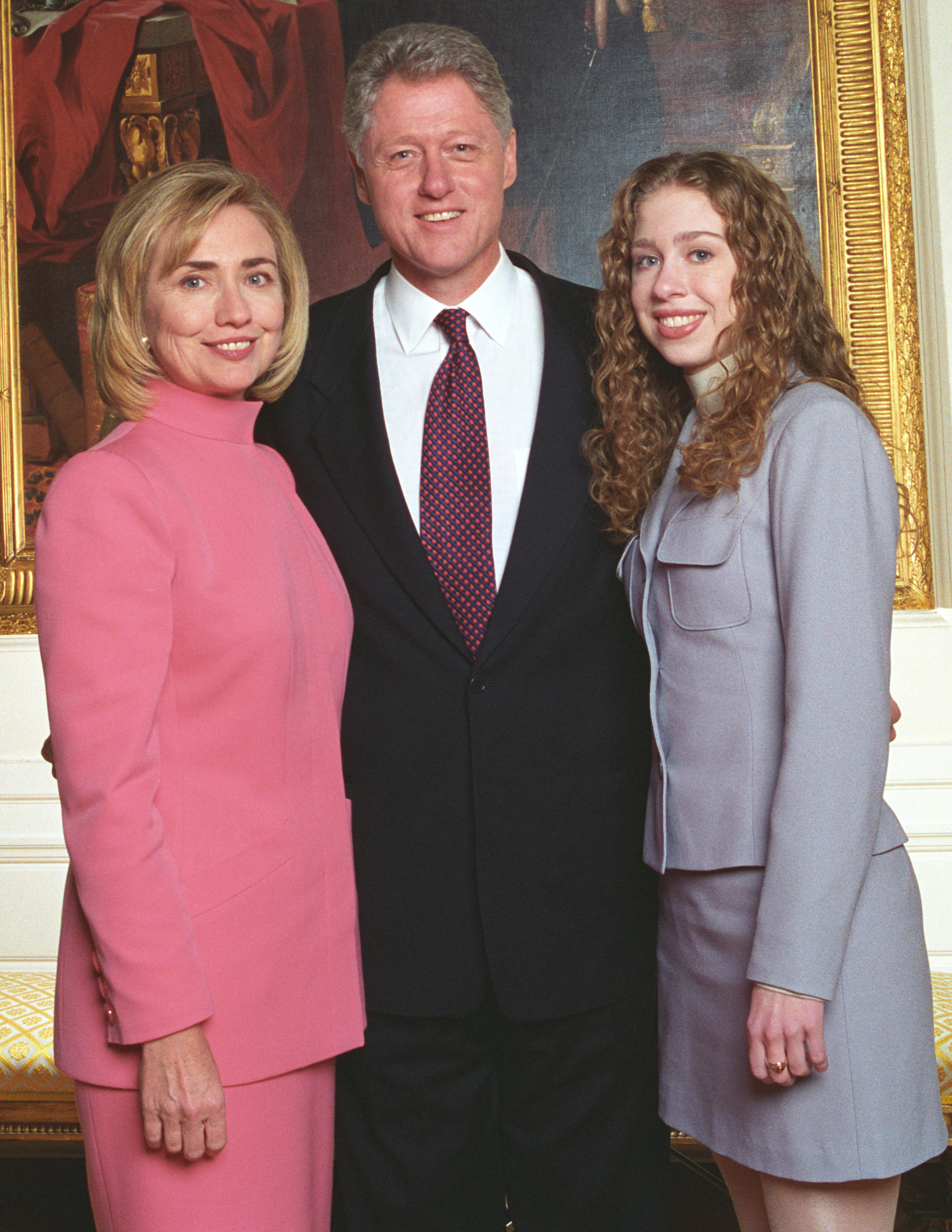
- Hillary, Bill and Chelsea during the second inauguration of Bill Clinton
- Current region: Arkansas and New York, United States
- Origin: Arkansas
- Titles: List: President of the United States; First Lady of the United States; United States Secretary of State; United States Senator (New York); Governor of Arkansas; Attorney General of Arkansas; First Lady of Arkansas
- Members: Bill Clinton; Hillary Clinton; Chelsea Clinton
- Connected members: William Jefferson Blythe Jr. Virginia Dell Cassidy; Roger Clinton Sr. Roger Clinton Jr. Jeff Dwire

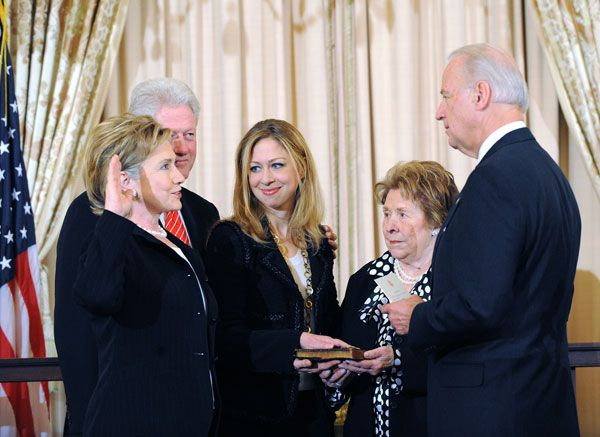
Four members of the family in January 2009. From left to right, Hillary Clinton, Bill Clinton, Chelsea Clinton, Dorothy Rodham, and the unrelated then-Vice President Joe Biden.

The Clinton family is an American political family from New York who originate from Arkansas, who are related to Bill Clinton, the 42nd president of the United States (1993–2001), and his wife Hillary Clinton, the 67th United States secretary of state (2009–2013), senator from New York (2001–2009) and the first lady of the United States (1993–2001). Their immediate family was the First Family of the United States from 1993 to 2001. In 2016, Hillary Clinton became the first female presidential nominee from a major political party in United States history. The Clintons (Bill and Hillary) are the first married couple to each be nominated for president. Hillary was defeated in the election by television personality, real estate developer and businessman Donald Trump.

They are not related by blood to the Founding Fathers and vice president George Clinton and his nephew New York Governor DeWitt Clinton. However, they are related through Bill's stepfather Roger, who was the first cousin five times removed of George Clinton.

== Parentage ==
=== Paternal family ===
Bill Clinton's father, William Jefferson Blythe Jr. (February 27, 1918 – May 17, 1946), was a traveling heavy equipment salesman who died in a car crash three months before Bill was born. Blythe was born as one of nine children to William Jefferson Blythe Sr. (1884–1935), a poor farmer in Sherman, Texas, and his wife, the former Lou Birchie Ayers (1893–1946). He was of English and Scotch-Irish descent, with family lines in North America since the days of the Thirteen Colonies.

William Blythe Jr. was married four times. He married for the first time in December 1935, and the bride was Virginia Adele Gash; they were divorced only thirteen months later. Although no child was born to the couple during their marriage, they later had a son together. After the divorce, Virginia moved to California and married first a man named Coffelt, then a man named Charles Ritzenthaler. However, she and Blythe remained friends, and she visited him on occasion. A son was conceived during these visits, and Henry Leon Blythe was born in Sherman, Texas, on June 17, 1938, some eighteen months after his parents had been divorced. Henry's parents lost touch with each other when he was an infant, after his father briefly married and divorced his mother's sister, and he never knew his biological father or paternal siblings. Later in life, Henry Leon Blythe took the name "Henry Leon Ritzenthaler" in honor of a step-father. He ran several small businesses in Paradise, California, including a janitorial business, and died in 2009. He was unaware of his connection to the future president until the presidential campaign of 1992, when an investigation by The Washington Post, based on birth registry records, revealed details of Bill Clinton's family. Ritzenthaler met his half-brother for the first time around that time, and the physical resemblance between them was remarked upon.

Blythe's second marriage happened in December 1940 when, nearly four years after his divorce from Virginia Adele Gash, Blythe married her sister, Minnie Faye Gash. This marriage was annulled only four months later, in April 1941, and there were no children. Barely days after the annulment, on May 3, 1941, Blythe married again. His third wife was Wanetta Ellen Alexander of Kansas City, Missouri. Wanetta gave birth to Blythe's daughter on May 11, 1941, exactly eight days after their wedding. She had become pregnant with Blythe's child even before he had married Minnie Faye Gash in December 1940. The daughter thus born to Wanetta and Blythe is Sharon Lee Blythe Pettijohn, who died on April 24, 2022, aged 80. Blythe and Wanetta were formally divorced three years later, in April 1944. They lost touch immediately afterwards; Wanetta, who eventually settled in Tucson, Arizona, had no inkling of Blythe's subsequent history until the presidential campaign of 1992 and the Washington Post story. Upon seeing old photographs of Bill Clinton's father flashed on TV, Wanetta "swears on a stack of Bibles ...... that that was the man she was married to" said her son-in-law Bob Pettijohn, Sharon Lee Blythe Pettijohn's husband.

Blythe's divorce from Wanetta Alexander was granted by court in April 1944. Seven months before that, in September 1943, Blythe had already "married" Virginia Dell Cassidy of Bodcaw, Arkansas. Blythe and Cassidy remained married until his death in May 1946, which happened in a car crash. On August 19, 1946, three months after Blythe's death, Cassidy gave birth to their only child, the future Bill Clinton. Cassidy had no knowledge of Blythe's previous marriages until decades later.

=== Maternal family ===
Bill Clinton's mother, Virginia Dell Cassidy was of Irish ancestry (later Virginia Dell Blythe Clinton Dwire Kelley), she was born in Bodcaw, Arkansas on June 6, 1923. She was the only child of James Eldridge Cassidy (1898–1957), a grocer, by his wife Edith Grisham Cassidy (1901–1968), a nurse anesthetist. Bill Clinton's father, William J. Blythe, was her first husband, and she married him in September 1943, when she was 20 and he was 25 years old. On the day of their wedding, Blythe was still legally married to his third wife Wanetta; his divorce from her was finalized only in April the following year. However, Cassidy may not have known of this circumstance at that time, and certainly did not know of Blythe's first two marriages until decades after his death. After Blythe died, she moved back with her parents, gave birth to a son three months later, and named him William Jefferson Blythe III. This was the future Bill Clinton.

In 1950, four years after Blythe's death, the young widow married car salesman Roger Clinton Sr. (July 23, 1908 – November 8, 1967). Roger was born in Yell County, Arkansas, in July 1908 to Allen W. Clinton (August 26, 1880 – June 14, 1965) and Eula Cornwell Clinton (May 29, 1882 – October 10, 1975). The marriage produced one child, the actor and musician Roger Clinton Jr., who was born in 1956 and is the only one of Bill Clinton's siblings to have been raised with him and have a close relationship with him. In 1962, Roger and Virginia Clinton suffered a crisis in their marriage; they got divorced and then remarried in quick succession within that year. At this time, the 16-year-old William Jefferson Blythe III officially adopted his step-father's surname as his own and took the name William Jefferson Clinton. Roger Clinton died in 1967 after seventeen years of marriage.

On January 3, 1969, only one year after Roger Clinton's death, his widow married for the third time. Her groom, Jeff Dwire (June 6, 1923 – August 12, 1974), was the same age as she, and had three daughters by a previous marriage. After briefly serving in the military, he had worked as a carpenter, a hairdresser, a judo teacher and a football coach, and had run a string of small businesses, including building houses, dealing in oil-well equipment and selling financial securities. What alarmed Virginia's family and friends was that he had served nine months in prison during 1962 for stock fraud. However, Bill Clinton was supportive of the new man in his mother's life; he served as Best Man and also played and sang at the wedding reception. The marriage, which produced no children, lasted until Dwire died in August 1974 from complications arising from diabetes.

In January 1982, Virginia Dwire married for the fourth and last time to Richard Kelley. This marriage, which produced no children, lasted until Virginia's death from breast cancer on January 6, 1994. In later life, Virginia was insistent that all official documents refer to her by her full and chosen name, "Virginia Dell Blythe Clinton Dwire Kelley."

== Family of Chelsea Clinton ==
Bill and Hillary Clinton's daughter Chelsea Victoria Clinton was born on February 27, 1980, in Little Rock, Pulaski County, Arkansas, while her father was Governor of Arkansas. On July 31, 2010, Clinton and investment banker Marc Mezvinsky were married in an interfaith ceremony in Rhinebeck, New York. Mezvinsky (born December 15, 1977) is the son of former members of Congress Marjorie Margolies-Mezvinsky and Edward Mezvinsky, and was raised in the Conservative Jewish tradition. The senior Clintons and Mezvinskys were friends in the 1990s and their children met on a Renaissance Weekend retreat in Hilton Head Island, South Carolina. They first were reported to be a couple in 2005, and became engaged over Thanksgiving weekend in 2009. Following their wedding, the couple lived for three years in New York City's Gramercy Park neighborhood, later purchasing a condominium in the NoMad District of Manhattan for $10.5 million. Clinton announced in April 2014 that they were expecting their first child. Their daughter Charlotte Clinton Mezvinsky, was born in September 2014, their first son Aidan Clinton Mezvinsky, was born in June 2016. Shortly after Aidan was born, the family moved to the nearby Flatiron District. Chelsea Clinton worked as an NBC reporter and currently works with the Clinton Foundation. Their second son Jasper Clinton Mezvinsky, was born in July 2019.

== Pets ==
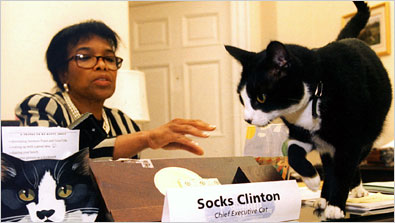
Socks with Clinton's secretary Betty Currie

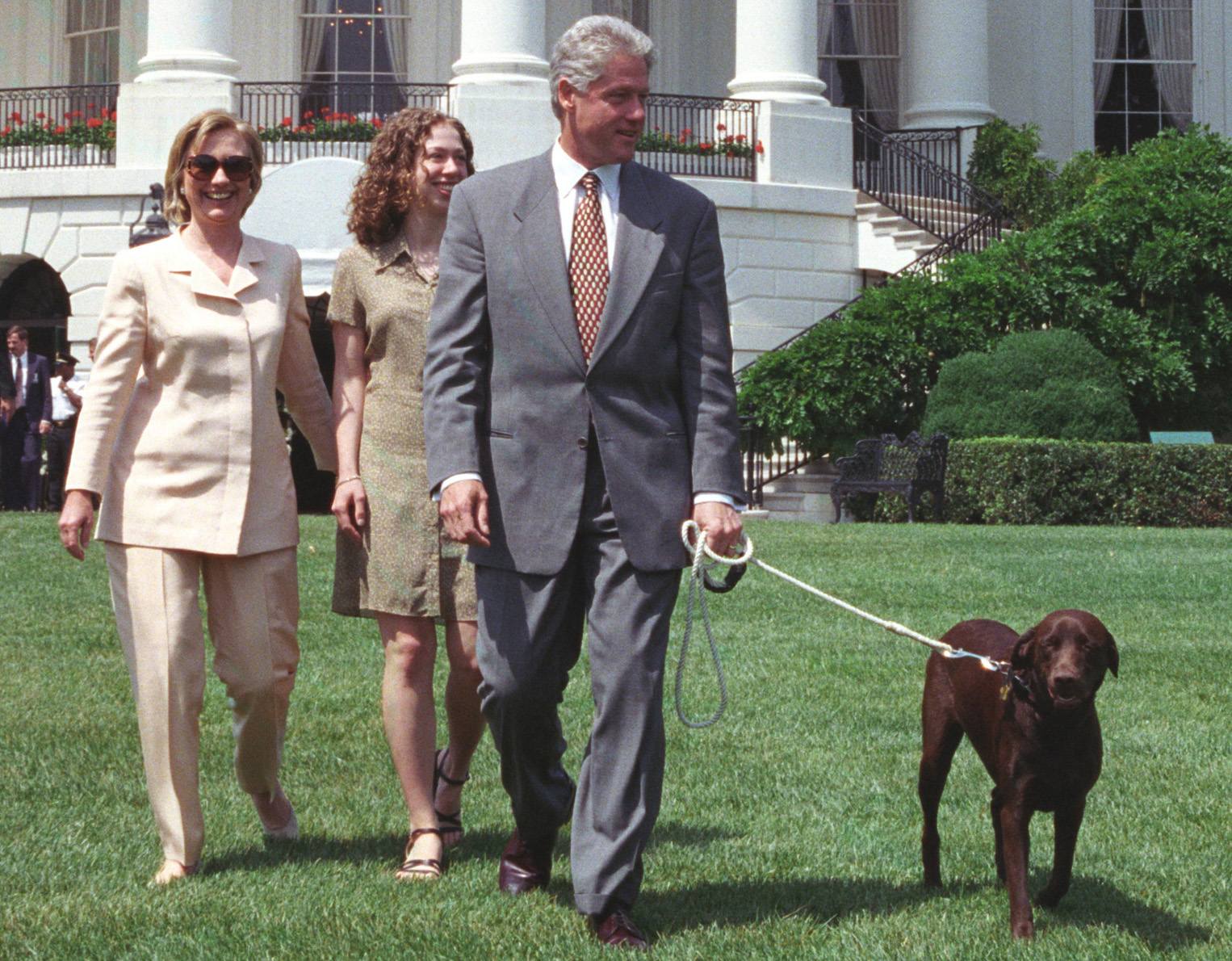
Buddy being walked by the Clintons on the White House lawn in 1998

While living in the White House the Clintons had two pets: a cat named Socks and a dog named Buddy. Socks, born about 1989, was adopted by the Clintons in 1991. The cat was left under the care of Bill Clinton's secretary Betty Currie, residing with her until Socks' death on February 20, 2009, euthanized due to cancer of the jaw. Buddy, a Labrador Retriever born on August 7, 1997, was adopted by the Clintons on December 5, 1997. Buddy was named after Clinton's great-uncle Henry Oren Grisham, nicknamed "Buddy". The Clintons kept Buddy after they left the White House in January 2001, however the dog was killed after being hit by a car on January 2, 2002. The two pets were reported to not get along. Clinton adopted a new dog the same year as Buddy's death, whom he named Seamus.

== Offices held ==
Bill Clinton

- Attorney General of Arkansas (January 1977 – January 1979)
- Governor of Arkansas (January 1979 – January 1981; January 1983 – December 1992)
- President of the United States (January 1993 – January 2001)

Hillary Clinton

- First Lady of Arkansas (January 1979 – January 1981; January 1983 – December 1992)
- First Lady of the United States (January 1993 – January 2001)
- United States Senator from New York (January 2001 – January 2009)
- United States Secretary of State (January 2009 – February 2013)

Hillary Clinton was the third female Secretary of State and the first former First Lady to hold political office. In addition, she was the runner-up for Democratic primary for president in 2008 and was the Democratic nominee in 2016.

== See also ==
- Clinton Family Portrait
- List of presidents of the United States
- List of U.S. political families
- Political families of the world
