= Roger Clinton =

Roger Clinton may refer to:

- Roger Clinton Sr. (1908–1967), stepfather of U.S. President Bill Clinton and father of Roger Clinton Jr.
- Roger Clinton Jr. (born 1956), half-brother of U.S. President Bill Clinton
- Roger de Clinton (died 1148), 12th century English bishop
