= William Jefferson Blythe Jr. =

Birth father of Bill Clinton (1918–1946)

- Born: February 27, 1918; Sherman, Texas, U.S.
- Died: May 17, 1946 (aged 28); Sikeston, Missouri, U.S.
- Burial place: Rose Hill Cemetery, Hope, Arkansas, U.S.
- Occupations: Traveling salesman, soldier
- Employers: J H Pereve Equipment Company, U.S. Army, Manbee Equipment Company
- Spouses: Virginia Adele Gash (m. 1935; div. 1937) Maxine Hamilton (m. 1938; div. 1938) Minnie Faye Gash (m. 1940; ann. 1941) Wanetta Ellen Alexander (m. 1941; div. 1944) Virginia Dell Cassidy (m. 1943)
- Children: 3, including Bill
- Relatives: Hillary Rodham (daughter-in-law); Chelsea Clinton (granddaughter)

William Jefferson Blythe Jr. (February 27, 1918 – May 17, 1946) was an American salesman of heavy equipment. He was the father of Bill Clinton, the 42nd president of the United States. Three months before his son was born, Blythe drowned following a car crash.

== Personal life ==
William Jefferson Blythe Jr. was one of nine children born to William Jefferson Blythe Sr. (1884–1935), a farmer in Sherman, Texas, and Lou Birchie Ayers (1891–1946). Blythe Sr. was of English and Scottish descent, with a family tree in North America since the days of the thirteen colonies.

Blythe was married five times. He married for the first time in December 1935 to Virginia Adele Gash when they both were 17; they were divorced only thirteen months later. However, Virginia Gash and Blythe remained friends, and she visited him on occasion. A son was conceived during these visits, and Henry Leon Blythe was born in Sherman, Texas in January 1938, eighteen months after his parents had been divorced.

Blythe married his second wife, 21-year-old Maxine Hamilton, in August 1938; they divorced two weeks later.

Blythe next married Minnie Faye Gash, his first wife's sister, in December 1940. The marriage was annulled four months later in April 1941, without children.

Shortly after the annulment on May 3, 1941, Blythe married again. His fourth wife was Wanetta Ellen Alexander of Kansas City, Missouri, and the wedding was held in Jackson County, Missouri. Wanetta gave birth to Blythe's daughter on May 11, 1941, eight days after their wedding. She had become pregnant with Blythe's child prior to his short-lived third marriage to Minnie. Their daughter, Sharon Lee Blythe Pettijohn, died on April 24, 2022. Blythe and Wanetta were formally divorced three years later, in April 1944, and lost touch immediately afterward. Wanetta, who eventually settled in Tucson, Arizona, had no inkling of Blythe's subsequent history until the presidential campaign of 1992 and a Washington Post story. Upon seeing old photographs of Bill Clinton's father flashed on TV, Wanetta "swears on a stack of Bibles ... that that was the man she was married to", said her son-in-law Bob Pettijohn, husband of her daughter Sharon.

Blythe's divorce from Wanetta was granted in court on April 13, 1944. Seven months prior on September 4, 1943, Blythe had bigamously married Virginia Dell Cassidy of Bodcaw, Arkansas. Blythe and Virginia remained married until his death in a car crash on May 17, 1946. On August 19, 1946, three months after Blythe's death, Virginia gave birth to their only child, William Jefferson Blythe III. Bill, as a teen, took his stepfather's surname and became known as Bill Clinton, the future 42nd president of the United States. Virginia Blythe-Clinton had no knowledge of Blythe's previous marriages until decades later when The Washington Post ran an extensive story in 1993, based on birth and marriage registry records, to mark Father's Day.

Blythe's eldest son, Henry Leon Blythe, never knew his biological father or paternal siblings. After their divorce, Virginia Gash moved to California and married first a man named Coffelt, then a man named Charles Ritzenthaler. She had lost touch with Blythe when their son was an infant, after he briefly married and then divorced her sister. Later in life, Henry Leon Blythe took the name Henry Leon Ritzenthaler in honor of his stepfather. Henry ran several small businesses in Paradise, California, including a janitorial business, dying in 2009. He was unaware of his connection to the future president until the presidential campaign of 1992, when an investigation by The Washington Post, based on birth registry records, revealed details of Bill Clinton's family. Ritzenthaler met his half-brother for the first time around that time, and the physical resemblance between the two was remarkable.

== Career ==
Blythe was a traveling heavy equipment salesman for most of his brief career. It was while he worked as a travelling salesman that he met and married all his wives. After his fifth wedding in September 1943, Blythe shipped out for military service in World War II. He was stationed in Egypt and Italy. He worked in a motor pool as a mechanic, repairing jeeps and tanks.

After the war ended, Blythe returned to Hope, Arkansas, to be with his wife. Shortly after he returned, he purchased a house in Chicago and readied it to receive his wife and expected child; he was apparently laying the ground for a more settled and conventional married life. Blythe moved to the new house in Chicago while Virginia remained behind in Hope. In Chicago, Blythe returned to his old job as a traveling salesman for the Manbee Equipment Company, which repaired heavy machinery.

== Death ==
On May 17, 1946, while traveling from Chicago, Illinois, to Hope, Arkansas, Blythe lost control of his 1942 Buick on U.S. Route 60 outside of Sikeston, Missouri, after one of his car's tires blew out. He survived the crash after being thrown from the car, but drowned in a drainage ditch. There were only three feet (1 meter) of water in the ditch. Three months later, Blythe's widow, Virginia, gave birth to their son, whom she named William Jefferson Blythe III in honor of his father and grandfather. In 1950, Blythe's widow married Roger Clinton Sr.; 12 years later, Blythe's posthumous son legally adopted his stepfather's surname. He has a granddaughter, Chelsea Clinton (with whom he shares a birthday), and three great-grandchildren through Bill.

== Memorial ==
Blythe was buried at Rose Hill Cemetery in Hope, Hempstead County, Arkansas. In 1994, Virginia was interred beside him. In Clinton's 2004 autobiography, My Life, the elder Blythe was extensively mentioned, including a visit that Clinton made to the site where his father drowned.

== See also ==
- Clinton family
