= Jeff Dwire =

Second stepfather of Bill Clinton (1923–1974)

- Born: George Jefferson Dwire; June 6, 1923; Bodcaw, Arkansas, U.S.
- Died: August 12, 1974 (aged 51); Yell County, Arkansas, U.S.
- Known for: Second stepfather of Bill Clinton
- Spouse(s): 2 including, Virginia Dell Cassidy Blythe Clinton (m. 1969)
- Children: 3 daughters

George Jefferson "Jeff" Dwire (June 6, 1923 – August 12, 1974) was an American small businessman in Arkansas. He was the third husband of Virginia Clinton Kelley and a stepfather of former U.S. President Bill Clinton and Roger Clinton Jr.

== Early life ==
He was born in Bodcaw, Arkansas. A veteran of World War II, Dwire was injured during a parachute jump and had later worked as a carpenter. He had worked his way through college as a hairdresser.

== Marriage ==
Dwire, who had three daughters from a previous marriage, met Kelley when she patronized the beauty salon he owned. They married on January 3, 1969, in Hope, Arkansas; the ceremony was performed by the Rev. John Miles, and Bill Clinton served as the best man. He also played and sang at the reception. Earlier, in August, Clinton had watched the Chicago Democratic convention on television with Dwire. Friends of the bride were concerned about the union, which was Kelley's third, because Dwire had been convicted of stock fraud in 1961.

== Dwire and the Clinton family ==
Hillary Clinton, then Hillary Rodham, described Dwire as a "supportive ally" in her attempts to forge a relationship with Bill Clinton's mother while Rodham was dating the future president. He also counseled Clinton concerning the draft, decisions involving which would become a major issue in his presidential campaign. Since Dwire and his new wife married later in life, the prospects of having children together were not favorable. At that time, Clarice Minner, their young babysitter and housekeeper, became pregnant with her second child. On October 12, 1969, with Virginia Dwire at her side as the nurse anesthetist, she gave birth to a little girl. She named her daughter "Jeffrey" Lynn Smith as a sign of adoration to the couple.

== Legacy ==
A 1967 Ford Mustang that he bought played a role in the 1992 presidential campaign and was a favorite nostalgia item of Bill Clinton. Jeff Dwire died due to complications from diabetes in 1974 at the age of 51. The Clinton family's housekeeper at the time Clarice Minner Hay, who was expecting a child, had so much admiration for the family that she named her daughter after Jeff. Her child subsequently became Jeffery Lynn Smith. Jeffery went missing three weeks before Christmas in 1985 while walking home from school in Hot Springs, Arkansas. She was 15 years old.
