= Remarriage =

Marriage following a previous marriage

Remarriage is a marriage that takes place after a previous marital union has ended, as through divorce or widowhood. Some individuals are more likely to remarry than others; the likelihood can differ based on previous relationship status (e.g. divorced vs. widowed), level of interest in establishing a new romantic relationship, gender, culture, and age among other factors. Those who choose not to remarry may prefer alternative arrangements like cohabitation or living apart together. Remarriage also provides mental and physical health benefits. However, although remarried individuals tend to have better health than individuals who do not repartner, they still generally have worse health than individuals who have remained continuously married. Remarriage is addressed differently in various religions and denominations of those religions. Someone who repeatedly remarries is referred to as a serial wedder.

== Remarriage following divorce or separation ==
As of 1995, depending on individual and contextual factors, up to 50% of couples in the USA ended their first marriage in divorce or permanent separation (i.e. the couple is not officially divorced but they no longer live together or share assets). Couples typically end their marriage because they are unhappy during the partnership; however, while these couples give up hope for their partner, this does not mean they give up on the institution of marriage. The majority of people who have divorced (close to 80%) go on to marry again. On average, they remarry just under 4 years after divorcing; younger adults tend to remarry more quickly than older adults. For women, just over half remarry in less than 5 years, and by 10 years after a divorce 75% have remarried.

People may be eager to remarry because they do not see themselves as responsible for the previous marriage ending. Generally, they are more likely to believe their partner's behaviors caused the divorce, and minimize the influence of their own actions. Therefore, they remain optimistic that a new partnership will lead to better results.

According to data analyzed by USA Today in 2013, remarriage rates in the United States have dropped by 40 percent over the last 20 years.

=== Factors influencing likelihood of remarriage ===
Many factors influence the likelihood of remarrying after a divorce. Based on the 2006 census, men remarry more often than women. Remarriage rates also differ by ethnicity; remarriage is most common among white women, while black women have the lowest probability of marrying again. Age is another determining factor; women who are older than 25 at the time of divorce are less likely to remarry than women who are younger at the time of marital dissolution. Having children is associated with higher rates of remarriage for men and women. Remarriage also differs by community setting. Women from urban areas or areas with a greater proportion of women who never married are less likely to marry again. Some environmental factors do not affect all ethnicities: only non-white women from communities with high unemployment and poverty have reduced likelihood of remarriage.

Some women enter cohabiting relationships after a divorce instead of remarrying. This pattern of cohabiting after a divorce is more likely for white than black women, for women without religious affiliation, with few or no children, and who live in more economically stable communities.

=== Outcomes of remarriage ===
On the whole, remarriages are associated with greater socioeconomic security and life satisfaction compared to remaining divorced or separated. People who remarry tend to have better adjustment to their divorce, reporting more positive evaluations of their lives compared to divorced individuals who remain single. While divorced couples have a higher risk of developing a wide range of physical and mental health problems, remarrying may attenuate, but not eliminate, some of these health risks. Second Marriages: Triumph of decision over hope? It is often assumed that second marriages are riskier than first marriages - “The triumph of hope over experience” as popularised by Samuel Johnson in 1791. A new analysis of data commissioned from the Office for National Statistics (ONS) challenges this assumption. In fact, second marriages overall do consistently better than first marriages. Where one or both spouses are marrying for the second time, couples marrying today face an estimated 31% risk of divorce during their lifetime, compared to an estimated 45% risk of divorce amongst couples where both spouses are marrying for the first time. However, second marriages do not always fare any better than the first. Again the rates of divorce and separation vary based on demographic and social factors. Second marriage disruptions are more likely for Black women and for women in communities that are less economically well off. Conversely, rates of divorce decline as age at the time of second marriage increases. Also, women who enter their second marriage with no children are generally more likely to sustain their marriages.

=== Vulnerabilities to second marriages ===
There are several reasons why second marriages can be more vulnerable to disruption. Partners bring the same personal qualities to their subsequent marriage as they had during the first, but some of these qualities may have contributed to the first marriage's problems. People who have divorced and remarried multiple times tend to be relatively impulsive and nonconformist. In second marriages, partners also often have to deal with additional complications that do not exist in first marriages, like combining families. Remarriages involving stepchildren have a greater rate of dissolution than those without.

== Remarriage following widowhood ==
The Emperor's Second Marriage, by Jean-Baptiste Debret, depicts the wedding ceremony of Emperor Pedro I of Brazil to Amélie of Leuchtenberg in 1829, almost three years after the death of the emperor's first wife Maria Leopoldina of Austria.

As of the 2006 census, 32% of the U.S. population over age 65 was widowed. Most people successfully adjust after losing a partner; research on bereavement patterns finds the most frequent outcome is resilience. Even so, remarriage rates among older widowers are fairly low, and even lower among older widows. However, looking at rates of remarriage vastly underestimates interest in new romantic relationships.

=== Differences in desire to repartner ===
Men and women not only have different remarriage rates, but they also differ in their desire to repartner (to establish a new romantic relationship). A year and a half after the death of a spouse, 15% of widows and 37% of widowers ages 65 and older were interested in dating. Differences in desire to repartner may stem from the different benefits men and women receive in and outside of a marriage.

The most frequent reasons older adults give for remaining without a partner after losing a spouse are gender-specific. While the common myth is "women grieve, men replace," research does not support this pattern. Rather, widows are more likely to report that they are reluctant to give up newfound freedom and independence. Many widows perceive a sense of liberation no longer having to take care of another person, and value this more than additional companionship. Widowers, on the other hand, tend to report that they have not repartnered because they are concerned about being undesirable partners due to older age and ill health.

Some studies have found that women who are not interested in a new relationship have explicitly decided to remain unpartnered. In contrast, men were more likely to report that they would not rule out the possibility but had not encountered a suitable relationship yet. Interviews indicate that widowers are more prepared than widows to take a chance on a new relationship.

Among widows, social support appears to promote interest in new intimate partnerships. Widows with confidants are more interested in repartnering than those without close friends. However, for men this pattern may be reversed. While overall widowers are more interested in remarriage than widows, only the men with low or average levels of support from friends are any more likely than women to report desire to remarry in the future. When widowers have high levels of social support from friends, they have equivalent levels of interest as widows. This suggests that men may be more motivated to repartner if they do not have as much social support as they would like. Women on the other hand tend to have more diverse sources of social support within their social networks.

Although the gender differences in desire to repartner are most well documented, younger age and greater unhappiness also predict increased interest in remarriage.

=== Likelihood to repartner ===
Men are more likely to repartner after losing their spouse; more than 60% of men but less than 20% of women are involved in a new romance or remarried within about two years of being widowed. Interest in repartnering is only one factor in determining the likelihood that a widow or widower will establish a new romantic relationship. Davidson (2002) describes a framework which proposes three primary intervening conditions affecting likelihood of repartnering following widowhood: availability of partners, the feasibility of a relationship, and desirability of companionship.

There are frequent gender differences in availability, desirability, and feasibility of new relationships. Availability of partners is a greater constraint for older widows; there are far fewer partners available for older women than older men, given that women tend to live longer and men tend to prefer younger partners. As detailed in the previous section, older widowers also typically have greater desire to repartner than widows.

Studies have identified many other factors that increase or decrease the likelihood of successfully repartnering following widowhood. Most of these factors fit within Davidson's framework. For widows, younger age is associated with greater probability of repartnering; younger women typically have more available potential partners. For widowers, new romance is predicted by greater income and education. In Davidson's model, feasibility of a relationship is affected by age, health, and financial resources; being younger, healthier, and having financial resources makes one a more attractive partner.

=== Outcomes of remarriage ===
Widowed older adults show high increases in loneliness, but expanding their social network or repartnering can attenuate this loneliness. Dating and remarriage following widowhood appear to be both fairly common and highly adaptive responses. Surviving spouses who remarry within about 1–5 years of being widowed have more positive outcomes (e.g. greater wellbeing, greater life satisfaction, and less depression) than widows and widowers who have not remarried. Further research has shown this reduced depression in repartnered compared to single widows and widowers is due to the remarried individuals' greater socioeconomic resources. For example, compared to widows who do not remarry, remarried widows tend to report higher household incomes and are less likely to report anxiety about financial matters.

== Remarriage and religion ==
Numerous religions and sects forbid, or formerly forbade, remarriage after divorce. Some still do, although in many countries the percentage of the populace that adhere to them has been shrinking for more than half a century. Outdated terms for second marriage that date to the earlier era of more widespread censure include deuterogamy and digamy, but the terms second marriage or remarriage are more readily understood.

=== Christianity ===
In Christianity, widows and widowers are free to remarry with a Christian person. Regarding divorce and remarriage in Christianity, the Gospel of Mark records Jesus' teaching "Whosoever shall put away his wife, and marry another, committeth adultery against her. And if a woman shall put away her husband, and be married to another, she committeth adultery." The Shepherd of Hermas, an early Christian work on the subject, teaches that while fornication is the only reason that divorce can ever be permitted, remarriage with another person is forbidden to allow repentance and reconciliation of the husband and wife (those who refuse to forgive and receive their spouse are guilty of a grave sin).

Most Christian Churches strongly discourage divorce though the way divorce and remarriage is addressed varies by denomination; for example, the Reformed Church in America permits divorce and remarriage, while connexions such as the Evangelical Methodist Church Conference forbid divorce except in the case of fornication and do not allow for remarriage of divorced persons in any circumstance.

=== Islam ===
In Islam, the remarriage of widows and widowers is permitted, with Muhammad—the founder of Islam—marrying nine widows.

== Alternatives to remarriage in later life ==
Remarriage is not always the goal or ideal arrangement for divorced and widowed adults. Especially among older adults, there is a growing acceptance and interest in alternative romantic commitments like cohabitation or living apart together (LAT). While for younger adults cohabitation is typically a precursor to marriage, older adults have additional reasons why they may not want to remarry and cohabiting may be the ideal partnership. For some, remarriage inspires feelings of disloyalty, and adult children can discourage remarriage based on concerns about inheritance. Many older women are interested in companionship but may want to avoid long-term obligations and are hesitant to give up their new independence. However, an arrangement called Living Apart Together (LAT) offers an appealing alternative; it is a form of intimate ongoing companionship that allows each partner to maintain autonomy and independent households.

== Health benefits of remarriage ==
Health is influenced both by current marital status and marital transition history. Marriage confers mental and physical health advantages, but remarried individuals who have been widowed or divorced continue to be disadvantaged compared to continuously married individuals.

Marriage has been shown to impart significant mental health benefits and remarriage seems to be protective as well. Overall, people who remarry have lower levels of depressive symptoms compared to others who have lost a partner (through widowhood, divorce, or separation) and remain single. Remarriage seems to be especially beneficial for men, who have lower levels of depressive symptoms than remarried women. However, the health benefits of remarriage do not appear to be as strong as those for continuous marriage. Several studies have found that the mental and physical health benefits of remarriage do not fully balance out the negative effects of a previous marital disruption. Compared to the strong advantage of being continuously married, the mental health benefits are progressively weaker the more previous marriages a person has had. Although men seem to benefit as much from remarriage as being continuously married, remarried women have weaker mental health benefits.

The mental health differences between remarried women and unpartnered women appear to be due to differences in economic resources and social support. Findings also indicate that the mental health benefit of marriage for women is primarily driven by the fact that married women tend to be physically healthier than cohabiting and unpartnered women. There may be a selection effect whereby healthy women are more likely to remarry, and subsequently, based on their greater physical health, experience less depression. On the other hand, even when controlling for economic resources, social support, and health, married men experience fewer depressive symptoms compared to cohabiting or unpartnered men. This is likely because depression symptoms in married men are so low.

The physical health benefits of marriage are well documented, but marital disruptions have been shown to negatively affect health. Remarriage can attenuate but not completely eliminate the negative health effects of a marital disruption. Among currently married persons, those who have previously been divorced or widowed have worse health than those who have been continuously married. Research has not found any difference in physical health between persons with only one compared to multiple marital disruptions.

== See also ==
- List of people who remarried the same spouse
- Widow conservation
- Deceased Wife's Sister's Marriage Act 1907 - UK law barred remarriage to a deceased wife's sister until the passage of this act.
