= Glenn Winslade =

Australian operatic tenor (born 1958)

Glenn Winslade (born 1958) is an Australian operatic tenor known for his interpretations of dramatic roles such as Florestan in Fidelio, the title role in Idomeneo, the title role in La clemenza di Tito, Erik in The Flying Dutchman, the title role in Rienzi, the title role in Lohengrin, the title role in Tannhäuser, the Emperor in Die Frau ohne Schatten, Apollo in Daphne, Bacchus in Ariadne auf Naxos and Max in Der Freischütz.

He has appeared with Opera Australia, Metropolitan Opera, Royal Opera Covent Garden, Glyndebourne Festival, Edinburgh Festival, Bayreuth Festival, and opera houses in Berlin, Hamburg, Dresden, Stuttgart, Vienna, Zurich, Venice, Rome, Monte Carlo, Paris, Madrid, Lisbon, Brussels, Amsterdam and Moscow.

== Personal life ==
Winslade studied singing at the Sydney Conservatorium of Music and at the Vienna Conservatory. He married Amanda Thane in 1978, divorced her in 1989, but reunited with her in 1995 and embarked on what The Sydney Morning Herald described as their wilderness years in London, remarrying in 1999. Amanda Thane, herself an operatic soprano, died in 2012.
