= Jalaludin Abdur Rahim =

Pakistani politician

Jalaluddin Abdur Rahim

Pakistan Ambassador to France
- In office 1974–1976
- President: Fazal Ilahi Chaudhry
- Prime Minister: Zulfikar Ali Bhutto

Minister of Defence Production
- In office 1972–1974
- President: Zulfikar Ali Bhutto; Fazal Ilahi Chaudhry
- Prime Minister: Zulfikar Ali Bhutto
- Vice President: Nurul Amin
- Preceded by: Ministry established

Minister of Law, Justice, Town planning and agrovilles.
- In office 1971–1972
- President: Zulfikar Ali Bhutto; Fazal Ilahi Chaudhry
- Vice President: Nurul Amin

4th Foreign Secretary of Pakistan
- In office 4 June 1953 – 11 January 1955
- Governor-General: Malik Ghulam
- Prime Minister: Mohammad Ali Bogra
- Preceded by: Sikandar Ali Baig
- Succeeded by: Akhtar Hussain

Personal details
- Born: Jalaludin Abdur Rahim; 27 July 1906 Chittagong, Bengal Presidency, British India (now in Bangladesh)
- Died: 1977 (aged 70–71) Karachi, Sindh Province, Pakistan
- Citizenship: Pakistan
- Party: Pakistan Peoples Party
- Other political affiliations: Pakistan Communist Party
- Spouse: Esther Rahim
- Relations: Justice Abdur Rahim (father); Huseyn Shaheed Suhrawardy(brother-in-law)
- Education: Dhaka University; Calcutta University
- Occupation: Communist social worker
- Profession: civil servant
- Cabinet: Zulfikar Ali Bhutto Government

Jalaluddin Abdur Rahim (Urdu: جلال الدين عبدالرحيم; Bengali: জালালুদ্দিন আবদুর রহিম; also known as J. A. Rahim) (27 July 1906 – 1977) was a Pakistani communist and political philosopher who was known as one of the founding members of the Pakistan People's Party(PPP)—a democratic socialist political party. Abdur Rahim was also the first Secretary-General of the PPP, and served as the first minister of production. A Bengali civil servant, Abdur Rahim was a philosopher who politically guided Zulfikar Ali Bhutto, serving as his mentor, and had helped Bhutto navigate through the minefield of bureaucratic establishment when Ayub Khan had taken Bhutto into his cabinet. Abdur Rahim also guided Bhutto, after the latter was deposed as Foreign Minister, to take down the once US-sponsored dictatorship of Ayub Khan.

== Early life and education ==
Abdur Rahim was educated at the University of Dhaka where Abdur Rahim received double B.Sc. in Political Science and Philosophy after writing and publishing the brief thesis on Nietzsche's philosophy. He also studied at Cambridge University and then chemistry at the Ludwig-Maximilians-Universität München, where he'd met his future wife, painter Esther Rahim, marrying her in 1929. Later, Abdur Rahim attended Calcutta University, receiving an LL.B. degree in Law and Justice. Abdur Rahim began his political activism in Pakistan Movement, serving as its activist in East Bengal. His father, Justice Abdur Rahim also had served as a senior associate judge at the Supreme Court of Pakistan.

== Career ==
=== Bureaucracy ===
After his education, Abdur Rahim joined the Pakistan Civil Services, picking up the first bureaucratic assignment in Foreign Service of Pakistan. Abdur Rahim served as the Foreign Secretary under the government of Prime minister Muhammad Ali Bogra.

=== Politics ===
For some time, he remained associated with Communist party, but also built personal relations with Zulfikar Ali Bhutto in 1965. After attending the socialist convention at the residence of Dr. Mubashir Hassan, Abdur Rahim played a key role in writing the party's socialist manifesto: "Islam is our religion; democracy is our politics; socialism is our economy; power lies with the people", on 30 November 1967. This manifesto was officially first issued on 9 December 1967. Abdur Rahim was made Pakistan Peoples Party's first secretary general after writing the party's constitution.

Abdur Rahim earned public notability after his name was announced as a Bengali member of delegation of Pakistan Peoples Party to launch a negotiation with Awami League party under Sheikh Mujibur Rahman. In 1970, Abdur Rahim along with Ghulam Mustafa Khar, returned to West Pakistan, telling Bhutto that the "meeting with Mujib was of no use". After the 1971 war, Abdur Rahim stayed in what remained of Pakistan, governing the Law ministry, Justice minister, and the Township planning and agrovilles. In 1972, Abdur Rahim was appointed the first Minister of Defence Production which he governed until 1974.

==== Disillusionment with Bhutto ====
His relations with Bhutto deteriorated after Pakistan People's Party began purging the radical and ultra-left wings of the party and Abdur Rahim was also sidelined by Bhutto later.

In July 1974, Abdur Rahim himself got disillusioned with Bhutto after seeing Bhutto's handling of internal affairs and publicly disagreed with Bhutto as he wanted Bhutto to deal with the matters efficiently, not by force.

He was appointed Pakistan's Ambassador to France by Bhutto just to get him out of the way and away from Pakistani politics. But he returned to Pakistan unscheduled. Abdur Rahim was then tortured by the members of the secret police, the Federal Security Force (FSF), and was thrown into jail in 1976. Shortly afterwards, he was released. Later after Bhutto had formally issued an apology to him, he again left for France to complete his tenure as ambassador. Some people say that Bhutto, during his final days, regretted his falling out with his former mentor, Abdur Rahim.

== Death ==
In 1977, Abdur Rahim suffered a heart attack and died. He is now buried in Karachi, Sindh, Pakistan.

== Writings ==
- Outline of a Federal Constitution of Pakistan: Islam is our Faith, Democracy is our Polity, Socialism is our Economy, Pakistan People's Party: Political Series (4), 1969.

== See also ==
- Bangladesh Liberation War
- Left-wing politics in Pakistan
- Pakistan-United States relations
- Pakistan-Soviet Union relations
