= Amanda Thane =

Australian opera singer (1953–2012)

Amanda Louise Thane OAM (18 December 1953 – 1 September 2012) was an Australian operatic soprano known for her interpretations of roles such as Violetta in Verdi's La traviata, Liù in Puccini's Turandot, Eva in Wagner's Die Meistersinger, and the title role in Donizetti's Maria Stuarda. She sang at the Royal Opera House, Covent Garden, from 1991 to 2000, including leading roles in Les Huguenots, The Tales of Hoffmann and La bohème.

Thane was born in Taree and studied singing at the Sydney Conservatorium of Music. Her teachers included German bass-baritone Hans Hotter. She married Glenn Winslade in 1978, divorced him in 1989, but reunited with him in 1995 and embarked on what The Sydney Morning Herald described as "their wilderness years" in London, remarrying in 1999.

In 2012 she was awarded the Medal of the Order of Australia.

== Discography ==
- 1990: Les Huguenots (Meyerbeer) as Valentine, with Joan Sutherland, Clifford Grant, John Pringle; Richard Bonynge conducting. VHS: Opus Arte OAF 4024D, DVD Kultur Video
- 1991: Turandot (Puccini) as Liù, with Ealynn Voss, Kenneth Collins, Donald Shanks; Carlo Felice Cillario conducting. VHS: Opus Arte OAF4004D, DVD: Kultur Video
- 1994: Orphée et Eurydice (Gluck) as Eurydice, with David Hobson, Miriam Gormley; Marco Guidarini conducting, choreography by Meryl Tankard. VHS: Opus Arte OAF4005D, DVD: Kultur Video
