= Virginia Clinton Kelley =

American nurse anesthetist (1923–1994)

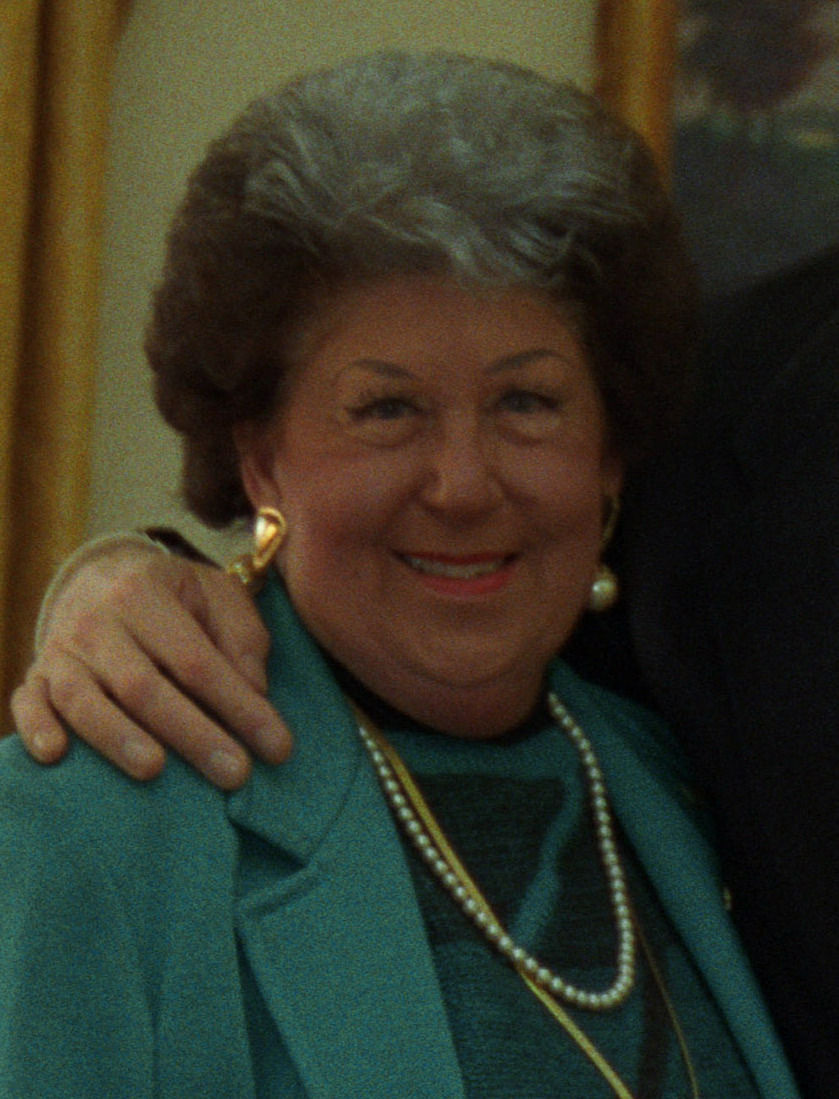
- Kelley in the Oval Office in 1993
- Born: Virginia Dell Cassidy; June 6, 1923; Bodcaw, Arkansas, U.S.
- Died: January 6, 1994 (aged 70); Hot Springs, Arkansas, U.S.
- Burial place: Rose Hill Cemetery, Hope, Arkansas, U.S.
- Other names: Virginia Dell Cassidy; Blythe Clinton Dwire Kelley; Virginia Clinton; Virginia Kelley
- Education: Northwestern State University
- Occupation: Nurse anesthetist
- Known for: Mother of U.S. President Bill Clinton
- Political party: Democratic
- Spouses: William Jefferson Blythe Jr. (m. 1943; died 1946) Roger Clinton Sr. (m. 1950; div. 1962) (m. 1962; died 1967) Jeff Dwire (m. 1969; died 1974) Richard Kelley (m. 1982)
- Children: Bill; Roger Jr.
- Relatives: Hillary Rodham (daughter-in-law); Chelsea Clinton (granddaughter)
- Family: Clinton family

Virginia Dell Clinton Kelley (née Cassidy; June 6, 1923 – January 6, 1994) was an American nurse anesthetist. She was the mother of Bill Clinton, the 42nd president of the United States, and Roger Clinton Jr.

== Early life ==
Virginia Dell Cassidy was born in Bodcaw, Arkansas. She was the only child of James Eldridge Cassidy (1898–1957), the town iceman (later a grocer), and Edith (née Grisham) Cassidy (1901–1968), a nurse. Her family moved to Hope, Arkansas, when she was a toddler. During her high school years, she worked as a waitress at a local restaurant. Following her graduation from high school, Virginia moved to Shreveport, Louisiana, to study to be a nurse like her mother. During her training in Shreveport, she met her first husband, William Jefferson Blythe Jr., whom she married in a civil ceremony in 1943, just before he shipped out for World War II military duty. Upon completion of her training, she returned to Hope, Arkansas. When her husband was discharged after the war, he picked her up and they moved for four months to Chicago, Illinois. Unbeknownst to her, the marriage was bigamous, because he was still legally married to his fourth wife.

She moved back to her parents' house while she and William were in the process of getting a new home in the Hope area. While William was on his way back to Hope, he was killed in an automobile accident, three months before the birth of their son, Bill III.

Virginia later spent time in New Orleans, Louisiana training to be a nurse anesthetist. In 1950, Virginia married car salesman Roger Clinton Sr., the father of her younger son, Roger Clinton Jr. Roger Sr. was an alcoholic and was physically and mentally abusive to Virginia and her boys. He did not adopt Bill, but Bill took his surname legally in 1962. He told his mother that it would be easier if they all had the same last name. Roger Sr. and Virginia divorced in 1962 but remarried each other a few months later.

== Last years ==
Following Roger's death from cancer in 1967, Virginia Clinton married hairdresser Jeff Dwire in 1969; he subsequently died of complications of diabetes in 1974. On January 17, 1982, she married Richard Kelley (1915–2007), an executive at a food distribution brokerage firm. Their marriage lasted until her death on January 6, 1994, from complications of breast cancer, at the age of 70, at her home in Hot Springs, Arkansas. She died just less than a year after her son became the 42nd president of the United States on January 20, 1993. She is buried alongside her first husband William Jefferson Blythe Jr. at Rose Hill Cemetery in Hope, Arkansas.

Before her death, she was interviewed by Connie Chung and spoke about both of her sons. She was also extremely close to performer Barbra Streisand, who described her as "like the mother I've always dreamed of."

In 1998, Bill Clinton recounted that his mother, along with his wife Hillary Clinton and John Lewis, was one of the earliest supporters for his initial presidential campaign.
