= Esther Rahim =

Pakistani painter (1904–1963)

Esther Rahim (25 June 1904 – 31 March 1963), also known as Esmet Rahim, was a German-born Pakistani painter.

== Early life and education ==
Born Esther Joesten in Munich, German Empire (now Germany), she was the first child of Joseph Joesten (a doctor) and his wife, Amalia, who was a painter. At the age of eighteen, she started studying art in Düsseldorf and took courses in sculpture under Antoine Bourdelle in Paris. In 1929, she obtained a Ph.D. from the Ludwig-Maximilians-Universität München in psychology.

== Married life ==
In 1929, she married Jalaludin Abdur Rahim (a.k.a. J. A. Rahim, one of the founding members of the Pakistan Peoples Party), who was continuing his chemistry studies after having obtained a degree at Cambridge University. Together with her husband, who joined the Indian Civil Service, she travelled to Madras in 1931. Her first child, named Razia, was born in 1932. With her husband, she moved to Calcutta in 1936 and to Delhi after the birth of her son Sikander in 1939. The couple were divorced in 1945. Nevertheless, she followed her former husband to Egypt.

In 1952, she left Egypt to settle in Europe, where she remarried J. A. Rahim and settled in Brussels (Belgium) before her husband was transferred to Karachi (Pakistan). In 1955, Esther Rahim moved to Bonn (Germany) where her husband became the Pakistan Ambassador to Germany. When her husband became ambassador to France in 1962, she once again followed him, this time to Paris.

Esther suffered from heart disease in the last two years of her life, and died in 1963.

== Artist ==
Esther Rahim was a founding member of the Karachi Arts Council. As an enthusiastic patron of block printed textiles, her patronage contributed to their revival and survival in Karachi during the 1950s.

Many of Rahim's artworks were not recognized in her lifetime due to social mores. However, 70 to 80 of her works were featured in the book 'Travels Mundane and Surreal: The Art of Esther Rahim', compiled by her son Sikandar Rahim and fellow artist Salima Hashmi.
