= Bodcaw, Arkansas =

- Town
- Location of Bodcaw in Nevada County, Arkansas.
- Coordinates: 33°33′38″N 93°24′05″W
- Country: United States
- State: Arkansas
- County: Nevada

Area
  - Total: 3.04 sq mi (7.87 km^{2})
  - Land: 3.00 sq mi (7.78 km^{2})
  - Water: 0.035 sq mi (0.09 km^{2})
- Elevation: 361 ft (110 m)

Population (2020)
  - Total: 121
  - Estimate (2025): 116 ▼
  - Density: 40.3/sq mi (15.56/km^{2})
- Time zone: UTC-6 (Central (CST))
  - Summer (DST): UTC-5 (CDT)
- FIPS code: 05-07450
- GNIS feature ID: 2405293

Bodcaw is a town in Nevada County, Arkansas, United States. The population was 121 at the 2020 census. It is part of the Hope Micropolitan Statistical Area.

== History ==
Patents on the land that would become Bodcaw began to be claimed in the 1850s, and a post office and stagecoach stop were established in 1878. By 1890, businesses and industries were operating in the area and a Baptist school known as the 'Bodcaw Academy' had been established.

The Bodcaw Academy was damaged by a tornado in 1915, and was not rebuilt. Public schools in the area were consolidated at Bodcaw in 1941, but in time, they would be further consolidated into the Nevada School District at Rosston. The post office was closed in 1959, but in 1969, the town was incorporated to provide services to the community.

As was the case with similar small towns, Bodcaw's population declined as its citizens began to centralize around the state's growing transportation corridors. By 2016, few retail businesses remained in Bodcaw. Major employers in the area included Nevada School District, along with opportunities in timber, cattle and chicken farming, mining, and oil and gas production.

== Geography ==
According to the United States Census Bureau, the town has a total area of 7.8 km^{2} (3.0 sq mi), of which 7.7 km^{2} (3.0 sq mi) is land and 0.1 km^{2} (0.039 sq mi) (1.32%) is water.

== Demographics ==
Historical population
Census	Pop.	Note	%±
1970	158		—
1980	197		24.7%
1990	161		−18.3%
2000	154		−4.3%
2010	138		−10.4%
2020	121		−12.3%
2025 (est.)	116	▼	−4.1%
U.S. Decennial Census; 2014 Estimate

As of the census of 2000, there were 154 people, 63 households, and 44 families residing in the town. The population density was 20.0 people /km^{2} (52 people/mi^{2}). There were 77 housing units at an average density of 10.0 units /km^{2} (26 units/mi^{2}). The racial makeup of the town was 98.70% White and 1.30% Black or African American. 1.30% of the population were Hispanic or Latino of any race.

There were 63 households, out of which 30.2% had children under the age of 18 living with them, 58.7% were married couples living together, 7.9% had a female householder with no husband present, and 28.6% were non-families. 25.4% of all households were made up of individuals, and 12.7% had someone living alone who was 65 years of age or older. The average household size was 2.44 and the average family size was 2.96.

In the town, the population was spread out, with 22.1% under the age of 18, 10.4% from 18 to 24, 21.4% from 25 to 44, 25.3% from 45 to 64, and 20.8% who were 65 years of age or older. The median age was 42 years. For every 100 females, there were 111.0 males. For every 100 females age 18 and over, there were 103.4 males.

The median income for a household in the town was $24,375, and the median income for a family was $45,313. Males had a median income of $35,625 versus $28,125 for females. The per capita income for the town was $13,574. About 18.6% of families and 21.9% of the population were below the poverty line, including 28.6% of those under the age of eighteen and 6.9% of those 65 or over.

== Infrastructure ==
=== Highways ===
- Arkansas Highway 53
- Arkansas Highway 32

== Education ==
=== Public schools ===
Public education for elementary and secondary school students in Bodcaw is provided by the Nevada School District, which leads to graduation from Nevada High School. As of the 2014–2015 school year, the district encompasses 345.15 square miles (893.9 km^{2}) of land, supports more than 400 students, and employs more than 80 educators and staff at its two schools and district offices

Nevada School District includes the following school facilities:

- Nevada Elementary School, serving kindergarten through grade 6.
- Nevada High School, serving grades 7 through 12.

On July 1, 1985 Bodcaw School District merged into the Nevada County School District.

== Notable people ==
- Virginia Clinton Kelley, mother of former U.S. President Bill Clinton.
- Jeff Dwire, second stepfather of former U.S. President Bill Clinton.
