= Roger Clinton Jr. =

American actor and musician, half-brother of former President Bill Clinton

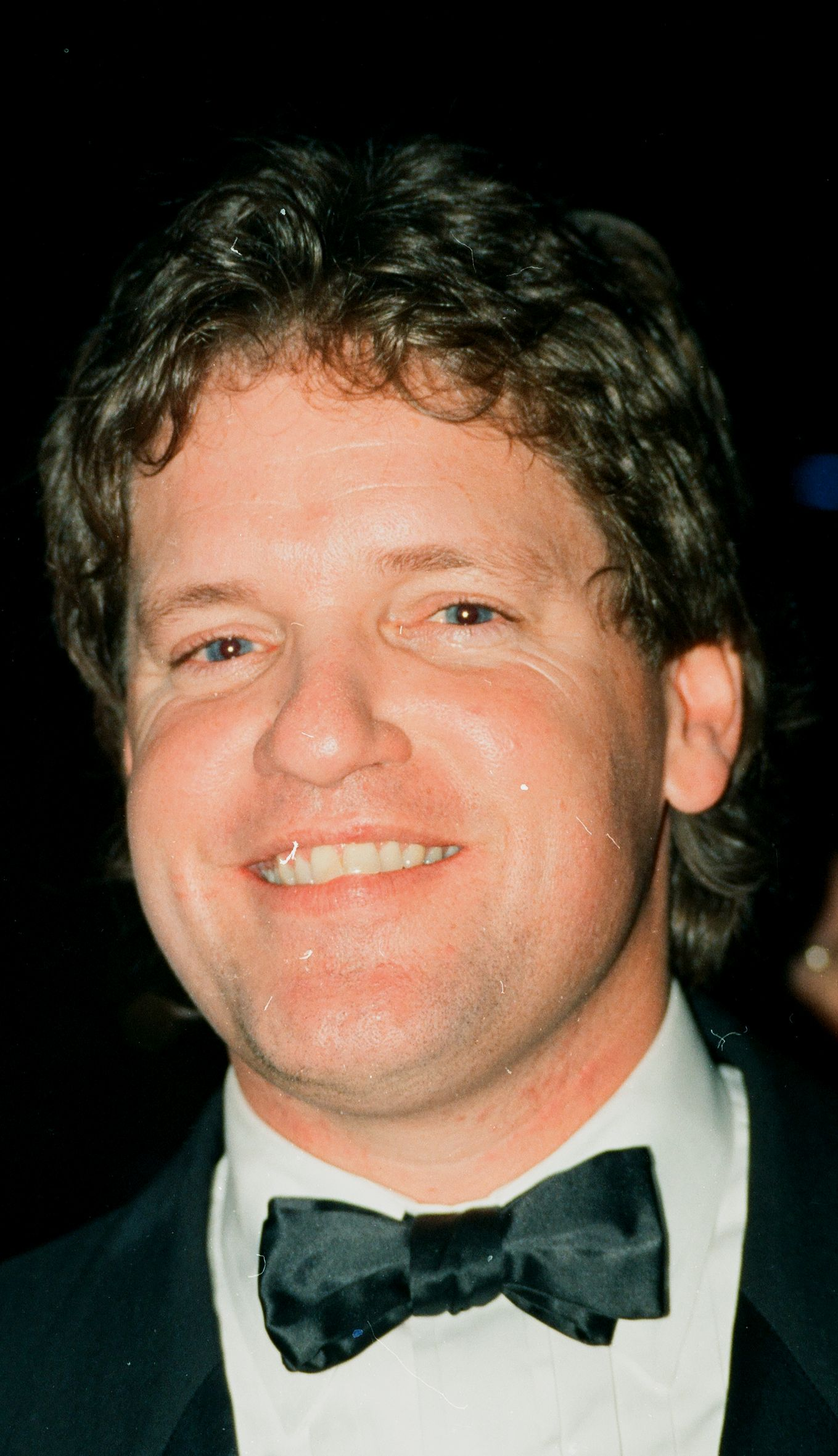
- Clinton in 1997
- Born: July 25, 1956 (age 70); Hot Springs, Arkansas, U.S.
- Occupations: Actor, musician
- Spouse: Molly D'Ann Martin (m. 1994)
- Children: 2
- Parent(s): Roger Clinton Sr. Virginia Cassidy
- Relatives: Clinton family

Roger Clinton Jr. (born July 25, 1956) is an American actor and musician. He is the younger half-brother of former United States president Bill Clinton.

== Early life and education ==
Roger Clinton Jr. is the only child of car salesman Roger Clinton Sr. and nurse Virginia Dell Cassidy. As a child, his elder half-brother Bill Clinton often had to protect him from Roger Sr., who was abusive and an alcoholic. He became a musician and formed a rock band named "Dealer's Choice."

== Career ==
=== Acting ===
Clinton has had minor roles in several films, including Bio-Dome and Fred Claus, and guest-starred on a number of television shows, including The Nanny as himself (neighbor), Sabrina, the Teenage Witch, and Cybill. He also provided the voice of his half-brother, President Bill Clinton, in the pilot episode of The Blues Brothers: The Animated Series.

=== Music ===
Clinton developed his singing career under the direction of Arkansas music impresario and manager Butch Stone. He gained professional experience by singing warm-ups for the studio audiences at tapings of the sitcom Designing Women, as well as by working as a lounge singer. As a result of a deal struck by Stone and music-industry attorney Stann Findelle, Clinton was initially contracted to Atlantic Records in 1992. His first album, Nothing Good Comes Easy, was released in September 1993 on the Pyramid/Atlantic/Rhino label. In December 1999, Clinton and his band paid a visit to Pyongyang, performing alongside North and South Korean musical acts. He has played Farm Aid, and sang "Feelin' Alright" in Cleveland during "The Cleveland Funeral", a program produced as a part of The Howard Stern Show.

== Personal life ==
From a brief relationship with Martha Spivey, he has a daughter named Macy (b. 1992). Clinton married Molly D'Ann Martin on March 26, 1994. Their son, Tyler Cassidy Clinton, was born on May 12, 1994.

=== Presidency of Bill Clinton ===
During his brother's presidential campaign and subsequent administration, Clinton was given the codename "Headache" by the Secret Service due to his controversial behavior. Clinton attracted negative media attention in 2001 when it was revealed that he had accepted $50,000 and a Rolex watch in 1999 from the children of Sicilian mobster Rosario Gambino, a convicted narcotics trafficker and Gambino crime family member serving a 49-year sentence, in exchange for lobbying his brother to pardon Gambino. Clinton repeatedly visited the federal parole commission headquarters to advocate for Gambino. In 1999, Gambino was included in a list of potential pardons, but he was ultimately not granted one. In January 2001, before his brother left office, Clinton was granted a controversial presidential pardon for a 1985 cocaine possession and drug-trafficking conviction. Roger Clinton Jr. had served time in federal prison after being convicted following a sting operation of conspiracy to distribute cocaine.

=== Driving-under-the-influence arrests ===
Roger Clinton pleaded guilty in August 2001 to a misdemeanor count of reckless driving after Hermosa Beach, California, city prosecutors agreed to drop two driving-under-the-influence (DUI) charges and one count of disturbing the peace against him. He was sentenced then to two years' probation, ordered not to drive with any alcohol or drugs in his system and to pay about $1,350 in fines and costs.

On June 5, 2016, Roger Clinton was arrested for DUI in the seaside city of Redondo Beach, about 20 miles (32 km) south of downtown Los Angeles, California. Since it had been more than ten years since his first DUI, according to California state law, this arrest was also treated as a first-time DUI. Clinton pleaded no contest to the charge of driving while impaired. The charge of driving with a blood alcohol content of 0.08% or higher was dismissed. As part of his plea agreement, he was sentenced to three years' probation for the DUI, and two days in jail for refusing a chemical test. He was ordered to pay a $390 fine (which increased to nearly $2,000 when penalty assessments, court fees, and other fines were added) and was also ordered to attend a nine-month alcohol program—the most a first-time offender can get—because his blood alcohol content measured 0.230% and 0.237% in a preliminary alcohol screening. In addition, because his arrest occurred in Los Angeles County, under the terms of Assembly Bill 91, the California Department of Motor Vehicles also required that he install an ignition interlock device in all vehicles he owned for a minimum of 5 months.

== Filmography ==
=== Film ===
Year	Title	Role	Notes
1993	Pumpkinhead II: Blood Wings	Mayor Bubba	
1993	The Last Party	Singer and Brother of Bill Clinton	Documentary
1994	Last Resort	Gino	Direct-to-video
1995	Till the End of the Night	Frank Riggio	
1996	Bio-Dome	Professor Bloom	
1996	Spy Hard	Agent Clinton	
1997	Retroactive	Truck Driver	
1998	Ivory Tower	Tim Cartridge	
1998	The Rugrats Movie	Air Crewman	Voice
1998	The Gardener	Dr. Nels Frankle	
1999	P.U.N.K.S.	Carlson	
1999	Implicated	Lieutenant Carney	
1999	Storm Catcher	Flight Controller	
1999	The White River Kid	Boot Scooters Proprietor	
2000	Chump Change	Studio Executive #3	
2007	Fred Claus	Roger Clinton	

=== Television ===
Year	Title	Role	Notes
1992	Hearts Afire	Restaurant Singer	Episode: "The Big Date"
1995–1996	The Nanny	Roger Clinton	3 episodes
1997	Cybill	Marty	Episode: "Name That Tune"
1997	The Blues Brothers Animated Series	President Clinton	Episode: "The People's Party"
1998	Breakfast with Einstein	Driver	Television film
1998	Sabrina the Teenage Witch	Frank	Episode: "Boy Was My Face Red"
1999	Timon & Pumbaa	Leslie's Boyfriend	Episode: "It Runs Good/Hot Air Buffoons"

=== Video games ===
Year	Title	Role	Notes
1995	Bloodwings: Pumpkinhead's Revenge	Mayor Bubba	
1998	Rugrats Adventure Game	Alien Queeg / Trashman #2 / Male Teacher	

== See also ==
- List of people pardoned or granted clemency by the president of the United States
