= Roger Clinton Sr. =

Stepfather of Bill Clinton (1908–1967)

- Born: July 23, 1908; Yell County, Arkansas, U.S.
- Died: November 8, 1967 (aged 59); Hot Springs, Arkansas, U.S.
- Occupation: Car salesman
- Spouses: Ina Mae Murphy (m. 1933; div. 1949); Virginia Cassidy Blythe (m. 1950; div. 1962) (m. 1962)
- Children: Roger Clinton Jr.
- Relatives: George Clinton (1st cousin 5 times removed)

Roger Miles Wister Clinton Sr. (July 23, 1908 – November 8, 1967) was an American car salesman. He was the father of Roger Clinton Jr. and first stepfather of U.S. president Bill Clinton having married Bill's mother Virginia in 1950 when Bill was 4. While Roger and Virginia Cassidy divorced in 1962 they were remarried again shortly after, with Bill adopting the Clinton surname.

== Early life ==
Roger Clinton was born in Yell County, Arkansas, the son of Allen W. Clinton (August 26, 1880 – June 14, 1965) and Eula Cornwell (May 29, 1882 – October 10, 1975). Clinton was an owner of the local Buick dealership that he ran with his brother and a friend, Earl T. Ricks. He was later described by Bill Clinton as "a handsome, hell-raising, twice-divorced man from Hot Springs, Arkansas". In 1950, he married Virginia Cassidy Blythe, mother of the future president, whose first husband William Jefferson Blythe Jr. had died in a car crash in 1946, three months before the birth of their son Bill. Roger Clinton and his family lived at the south end of Hope. Eventually Clinton sold the Buick dealership and moved, with his family, to a 400-acre (160 ha) farm a few miles west of Hot Springs. After a year or so on the farm, around 1955, they moved into Hot Springs. In 1956, he and Virginia had their only child, Roger Clinton Jr., in Hot Springs.

Roger Sr. and Virginia divorced in 1962, but remarried a few months later, after which his stepson took the surname Clinton at the Garland County Courthouse. One of the reasons for the name change was that his stepson wanted for him and his brother to have the same last name in school. Bill Clinton also said that he adopted it eventually out of respect for his stepfather. He wrote, in My Life, "Maybe I even wanted to do something nice" for Roger Sr.

== Later life ==
Clinton was said to have suffered from alcoholism and to have been abusive towards his family. Though Bill loved his stepfather, Roger's alcoholism, gambling, and subsequent abuse of his family would lead to Bill's intervening on numerous occasions with physical force, each time resulting in his stepfather's arrest. Clinton was eventually reconciled with his stepson when Bill drove down from Georgetown over several weekends to visit him at the Duke Medical Center in Durham, North Carolina, after he became ill; this was a journey of some 200 miles (320 km). Bill would eventually forgive Roger for his abusive actions as a stepfather. Roger's illness recurred later in the fall of 1967. After a period in the hospital, he asked to come home to die. Roger Clinton died of cancer aged 59 in 1967.
